= Viktor Orbán =

Prime Minister of Hungary (1998–2002, 2010–2026)

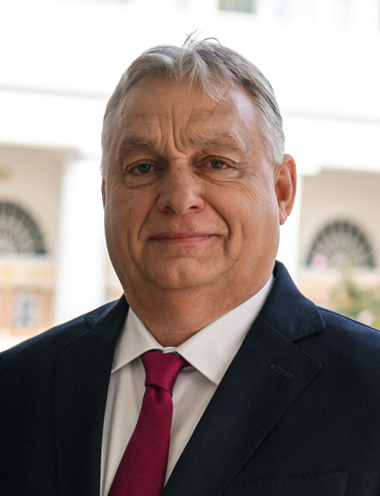
- Orbán in 2025

Prime Minister of Hungary
- In office 29 May 2010 – 9 May 2026
- President: László Sólyom; Pál Schmitt; László Kövér (acting); János Áder; Katalin Novák; László Kövér (acting); Tamás Sulyok
- Deputy: Tibor Navracsics; Sándor Pintér; Zsolt Semjén; Mihály Varga
- Preceded by: Gordon Bajnai
- Succeeded by: Péter Magyar
- In office 6 July 1998 – 27 May 2002
- President: Árpád Göncz; Ferenc Mádl
- Deputy: István Stumpf
- Preceded by: Gyula Horn
- Succeeded by: Péter Medgyessy

President of Fidesz
- Incumbent
- Assumed office 17 May 2003
- Preceded by: János Áder
- In office 18 April 1993 – 29 January 2000
- Preceded by: Office established
- Succeeded by: László Kövér

Leader of the Fidesz Group in the National Assembly
- In office 23 May 1990 – 18 April 1993
- Preceded by: Position established
- Succeeded by: József Szájer

Member of the National Assembly
- In office 2 May 1990 – 8 May 2026
- Constituency: National PR list (1998–2006, 2014–2026); Fejér regional list (1994–1998, 2010–2014); Pest Area (1990–1994, 2006–2010)

Personal details
- Born: Viktor Mihály Orbán; 31 May 1963 (age 63) Székesfehérvár, Hungary
- Party: Fidesz (since 1988)
- Spouse: Anikó Lévai (m. 1986)
- Children: 5, including Gáspár
- Education: Eötvös Loránd University (JD)
- Profession: Politician; lawyer
- Website: Viktor Orbán website

Viktor Mihály Orbán (Note: Hungarian: [ˈviktor ˈmihaːj ˈorbaːn];) (born 31 May 1963) is a Hungarian lawyer and politician who served as the prime minister of Hungary from 1998 to 2002 and from 2010 to 2026. He has also been the president of Fidesz, which has been variously characterised as a Christian nationalist, illiberal, and far-right political party. He has served as its president since 2003, and previously from 1993 to 2000.

Orbán was first elected to the National Assembly in 1990 and led Fidesz's parliamentary group until 1993. During his first term as prime minister and head of the conservative coalition government from 1998 to 2002, inflation and the fiscal deficit shrank, and Hungary joined NATO. After losing re-election, Orbán led the opposition party from 2002 to 2010. He was re-elected as prime minister in 2010, and then in 2014, 2018, and 2022, winning supermajorities in all four elections. On 29 November 2020, he became the country's longest-serving prime minister.

Starting from its return in 2010, Orbán's government enacted a series of constitutional and institutional changes, including the 2013 amendments to the Constitution of Hungary, reforms to the judiciary affecting the administration of courts, and the creation of regulatory bodies overseeing media. Organizations such as the European Commission and Freedom House have described these developments as weakening judicial independence and media pluralism, and enabling democratic backsliding. His government has also faced allegations of corruption involving the allocation of public contracts and EU funds. In March 2019, Fidesz was suspended from the European Union's Christian Democratic party, the European People's Party (EPP). In March 2021, Fidesz left the EPP over a dispute over new rule-of-law language in the latter's bylaws. Orbán lost the 2026 parliamentary election, which saw record turnout, to Péter Magyar's Tisza Party in a landslide. Orbán subsequently announced that he would both remain as leader of Fidesz and refuse to take his seat in the new parliament, which subsequently adopted a constitutional amendment barring Orbán from returning to the prime ministry by imposing a two-term limit on the position.

In foreign and social policy, Orbán opposed aspects of European Union migration and asylum policy, and supported domestic legislation restricting LGBTQ rights in Hungary, including same-sex marriage, same-sex adoption and LGBTQ-inclusive education. While advocating Christian nationalism and describing his political model as an "illiberal state", he promoted soft Euroscepticism, opposition to liberal democracy, and closer economic and political ties with countries including China, Russia, and Turkey. Orbán approved Finland and Sweden's NATO membership applications despite delays in processing them but opposed Ukraine's accession to both the European Union and NATO. His government faced allegations of enriching elites associated with the administration, and was characterized as a kleptocracy. Analysts and institutions variously characterized Hungary under his leadership as a hybrid regime, dominant-party system, or mafia state.

== Early life and background (1963–1988) ==
Viktor Mihály Orbán was born on 31 May 1963 and has two younger brothers, both businessmen, Győző Jr. (born in 1965) and Áron (born in 1977). Their paternal grandfather, Mihály Orbán, a former dockworker and a war veteran, farmed and worked as a veterinary assistant in Alcsútdoboz in Fejér County, where Orbán first lived while growing up. In 1973, the family resettled to neighboring Felcsút, where Orbán's father headed the machinery department at the local farm collective. Orbán attended school there and in Vértesacsa. In 1977, the family moved to Székesfehérvár, where Orbán had secured a place at the prestigious Blanka Teleki school. In his first two years there, he served as local secretary of the Hungarian Young Communist League (KISZ), in which membership was mandatory for matriculation to a university. Additionally, his father happened to be a patron of the KISZ.

After graduating from high school in 1981, Orbán completed his military service alongside Lajos Simicska, whom he had befriended in high school. Orbán was jailed several times for indiscipline, which included a failure to appear for duty during the 1982 FIFA World Cup and striking a non-commissioned officer during a personal altercation. His time in the army also coincided with the declaration of martial law in Poland in December 1981, which his friend Simicska criticized. During that period, Orbán recalled, he expected to be mobilized to invade Poland. He would later remark that military service had shifted his political views radically from the previous position of a "naive and devoted supporter" of the Communist regime. Nonetheless, a state security report from May 1982 still described him as "loyal to our social system".

In 1983, Orbán went to study law at the Eötvös Loránd University in Budapest. There, he joined Jogász Társadalomtudományi Szakkollégium (Lawyers' Special College of Social Sciences), a residential college—established in 1983 by István Stumpf and modeled on English universities—for law students from outside the capital. Its members were permitted to explore social sciences beyond the socialist canon and the "new" field of "bourgeois" political science, in particular. There, Orbán met Gábor Fodor and László Kövér.

Orbán became chairman of the executive committee of the college's 60 students in 1984. He also went on a series of trips to Poland with his classmates and a lecturer, Tamás Fellegi, during the 1984–1985 school year and again in 1987, during the third pastoral visit of John Paul II. Their lead Polish contacts were Małgorzata Tarasiewicz and Adam Jagusiak, who would become members of the anti-Communist student movement Freedom and Peace, beginning in 1985.

In 1986, Orbán submitted his master's thesis on the Polish Solidarity movement, based on interviews with its leaders. That August, shortly before his marriage to Dr Anikó Lévai in Szolnok, in September 1986, a police source reported him as affiliated with an organization whose members were lecturing in the United States and West Germany, presenting themselves as "the country's expected future leaders." They received Western support while also enjoying full protection by the Budapest police (BRFK) and insider access to top-level government decisions through the Communist Interior Minister István Horváth. The minister was expected to intervene personally to clear Orbán, in particular, of any sedition charges.

After obtaining the higher degree of Juris Doctor in 1987, Orbán lived in Szolnok for two years, commuting to his job in Budapest as a sociologist at the Management Training Institute of the Ministry of Agriculture and Food. In November 1987, at the Lawyers' Special College of Social Sciences, Orbán welcomed a group of 150 delegates from 17 countries to a two-day seminar—backed by the European Network for East–West Dialogue—on the Perestroika, conscientious objection, and the prospects for a pan-European democratic movement.

In September 1989, Orbán took up a research fellowship at Pembroke College, Oxford, funded by the Soros Foundation, which had employed him part-time since April 1988. He began work on the concept of civil society in European political thought, under the guidance of Zbigniew Pełczyński. During this time, he unsuccessfully contested the Fidesz leadership elections in Budapest, which he had lost to Fodor. In January 1990, he abandoned his project at Oxford and returned to Hungary with his family to run for a seat in Hungary's first post-communist parliament.

== Political ascent (1988–1998) ==
On 30 March 1988, at the Lawyers' Special College of Social Sciences, Orbán–alongside Stumpf, Fodor, Kövér, and 32 other students and activists–founded the Alliance of Young Democrats (Fiatal Demokraták Szövetsége, FIDESZ), a liberal-nationalist youth movement conceived as an overt political challenge to the Hungarian Young Communist League, whose members were banned from participation.

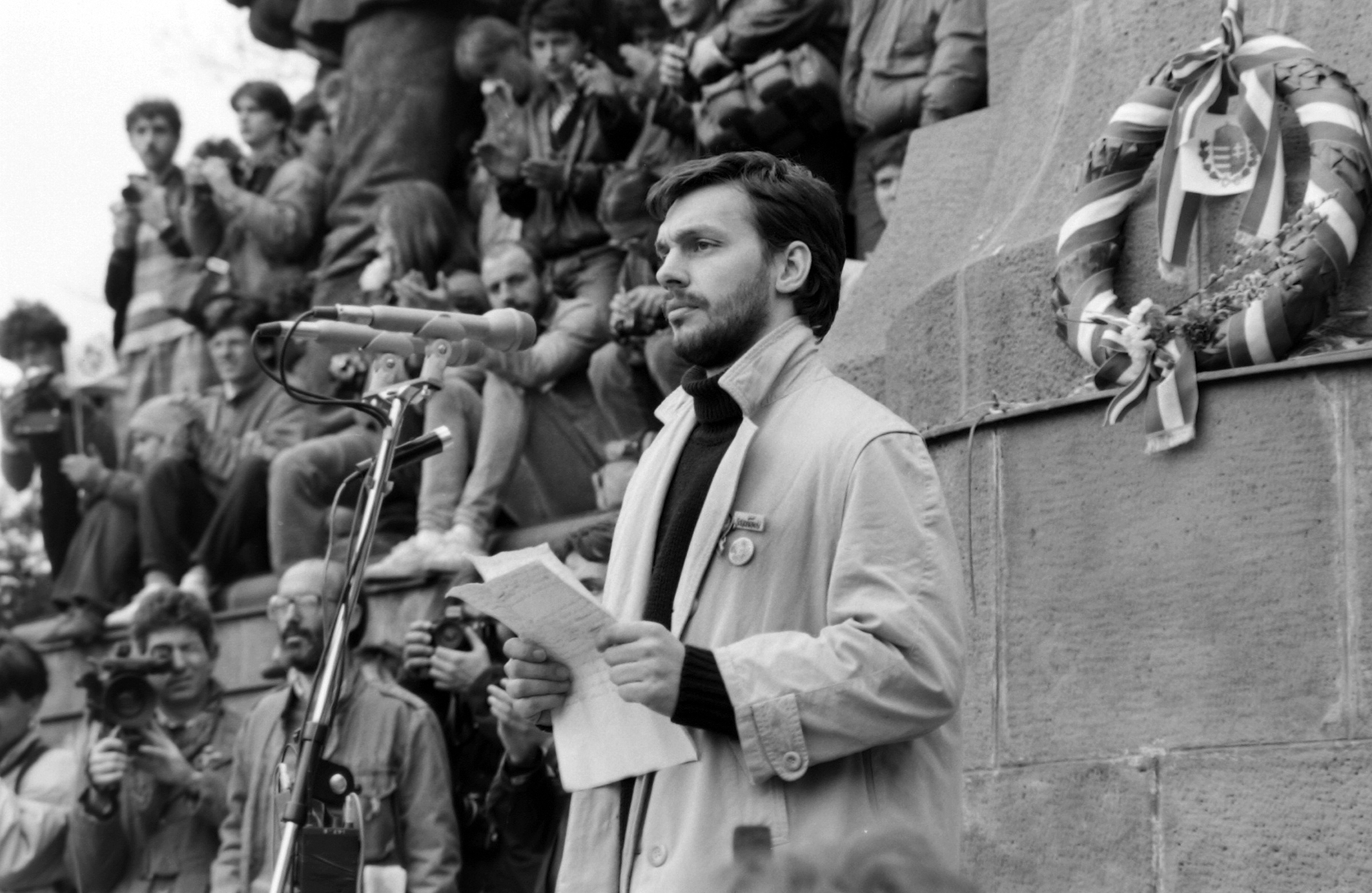
Orbán in Budapest, 1988

The college journal Századvég (End of the Century), established with Orbán's help and funded by George Soros since 1985, grew into Fidesz's press organ.

On 16 June 1989, Orbán gave a speech in Heroes' Square, Budapest, on the occasion of the reburial of Imre Nagy and other national martyrs of the 1956 Hungarian Revolution. In his speech, he demanded free elections and the withdrawal of Soviet troops, which brought him to national prominence and announced the existence of Fidesz. In the summer of 1989, he took part in the opposition round table talks, representing Fidesz alongside László Kövér. Fidesz was established as a political party in October 1989.

On returning home from Oxford, he secured the first spot on the Fidesz candidate list ahead of Fodor and was elected Member of Parliament from Pest County at the April 1990 election.

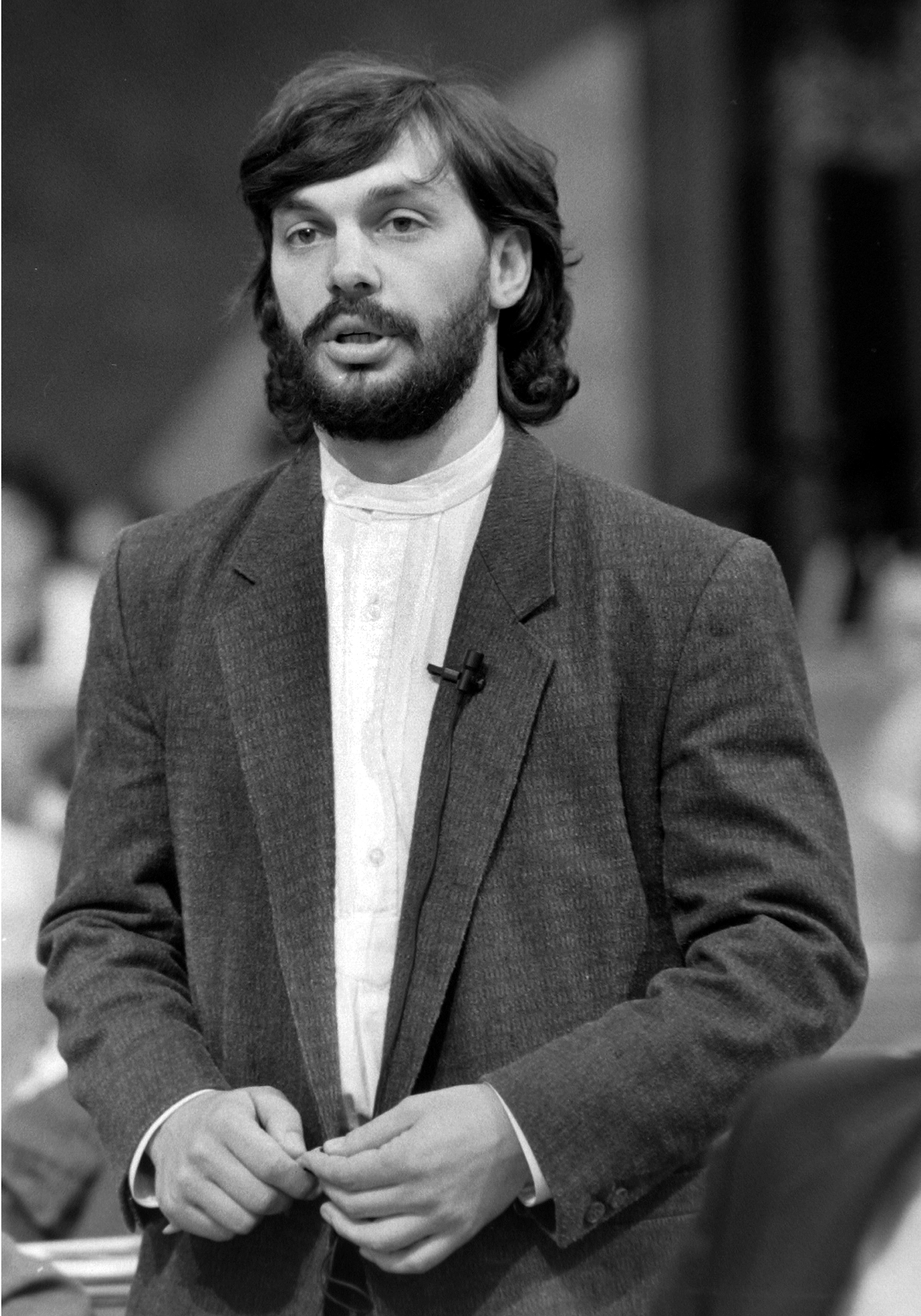
Orbán in 1990

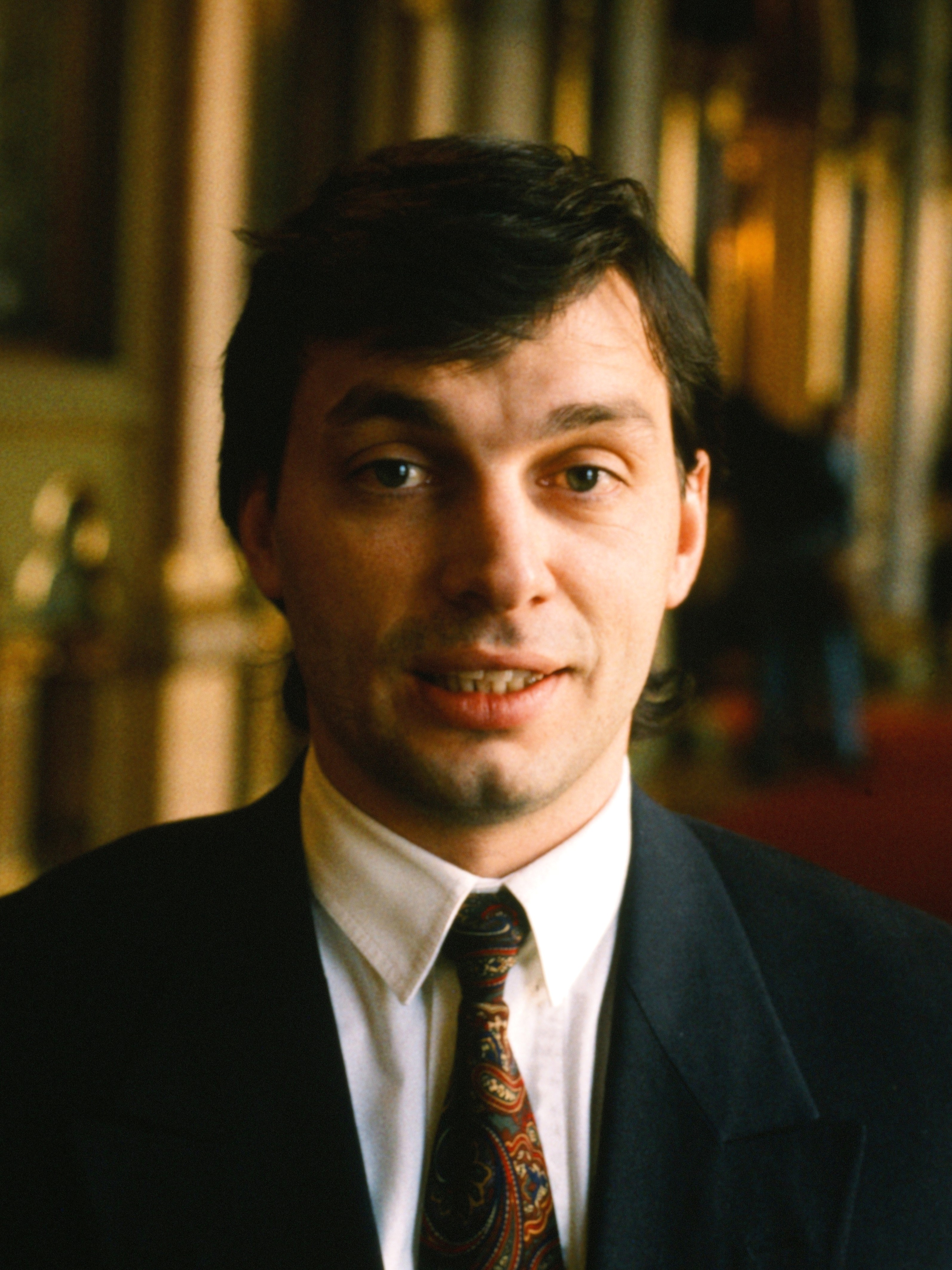
Orbán after winning a seat in the 1990 parliamentary election

He was appointed leader of Fidesz's parliamentary group, in this capacity until May 1993.

On 18 April 1993, Orbán became the first president of Fidesz, replacing the national board that had served as a collective leadership since its founding. Under his leadership, Fidesz gradually transformed from a radical liberal student organization to a center-right people's party.

The conservative turn caused a severe split in the membership. Several members left the party, including Péter Molnár, Gábor Fodor, and Zsuzsanna Szelényi. Fodor and others later joined the liberal Alliance of Free Democrats (SZDSZ), initially a strong ally of Fidesz, but later a political opponent.

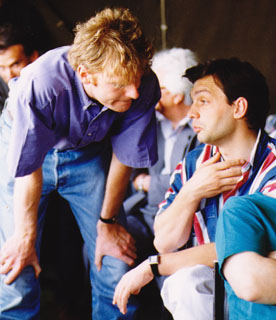
Orbán with Gábor Fodor in 1993

During the 1994 parliamentary election, Fidesz barely reached the 5% threshold. Orbán became an MP from his party's Fejér County Regional List. He was chairman of the Committee on European Integration Affairs between 1994 and 1998. He was also a member of the Immunity, Incompatibility and Credentials Committee for a short time in 1995. Under his presidency, Fidesz adopted "Hungarian Civic Party" (Magyar Polgári Párt) to its shortened name in 1995. His party gradually became dominant on the right wing of the political spectrum, while the former ruling conservative Hungarian Democratic Forum (MDF) had lost much of its support. From April 1996, Orbán was chairman of the Hungarian National Committee of the New Atlantic Initiative (NAI).

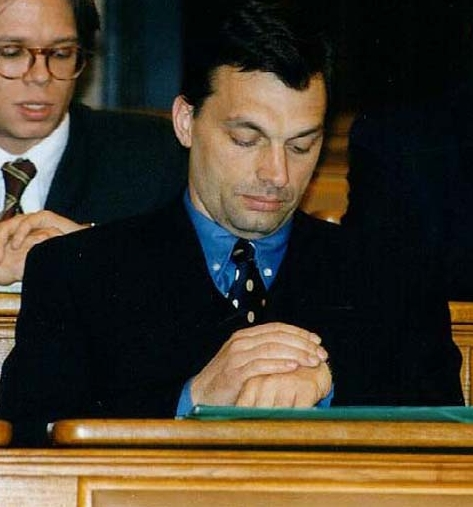
Orbán in 1997 as the leader of the opposition

In September 1992, Orbán was elected vice-chairman of the Liberal International. In November 2000, however, Fidesz left the Liberal International and joined the European People's Party (EPP). During this time, Orbán worked hard to unite the center-right liberal conservative parties in Hungary. At the EPP's Congress in Estoril in October 2002, he was elected vice-president, an office he held until 2012.

== First premiership (1998–2002) ==
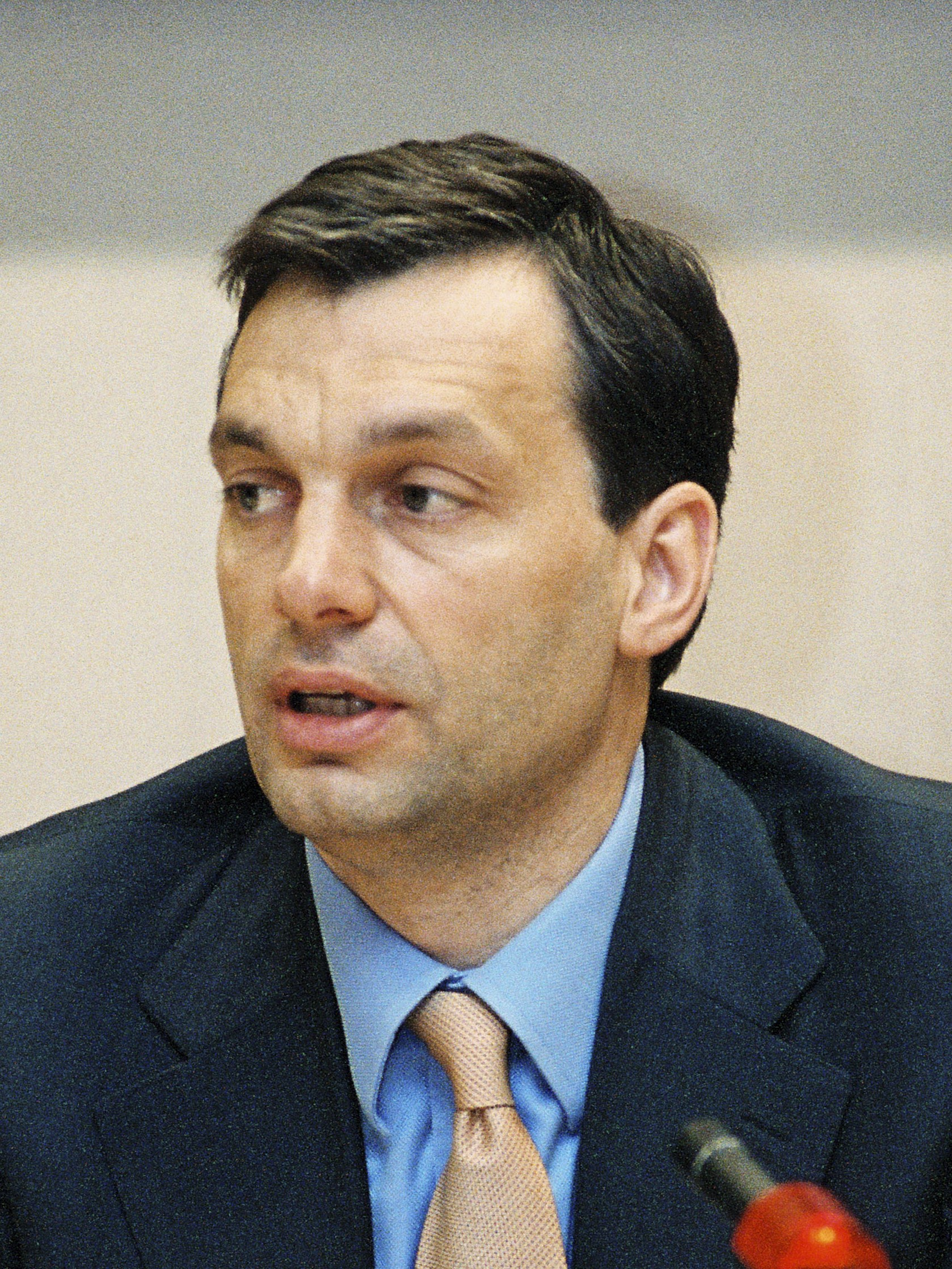
- First premiership of Viktor Orbán; 6 July 1998 – 27 May 2002
- President: Árpád Göncz; Ferenc Mádl
- Cabinet: First Orbán Government
- Party: Fidesz
- Election: 1998

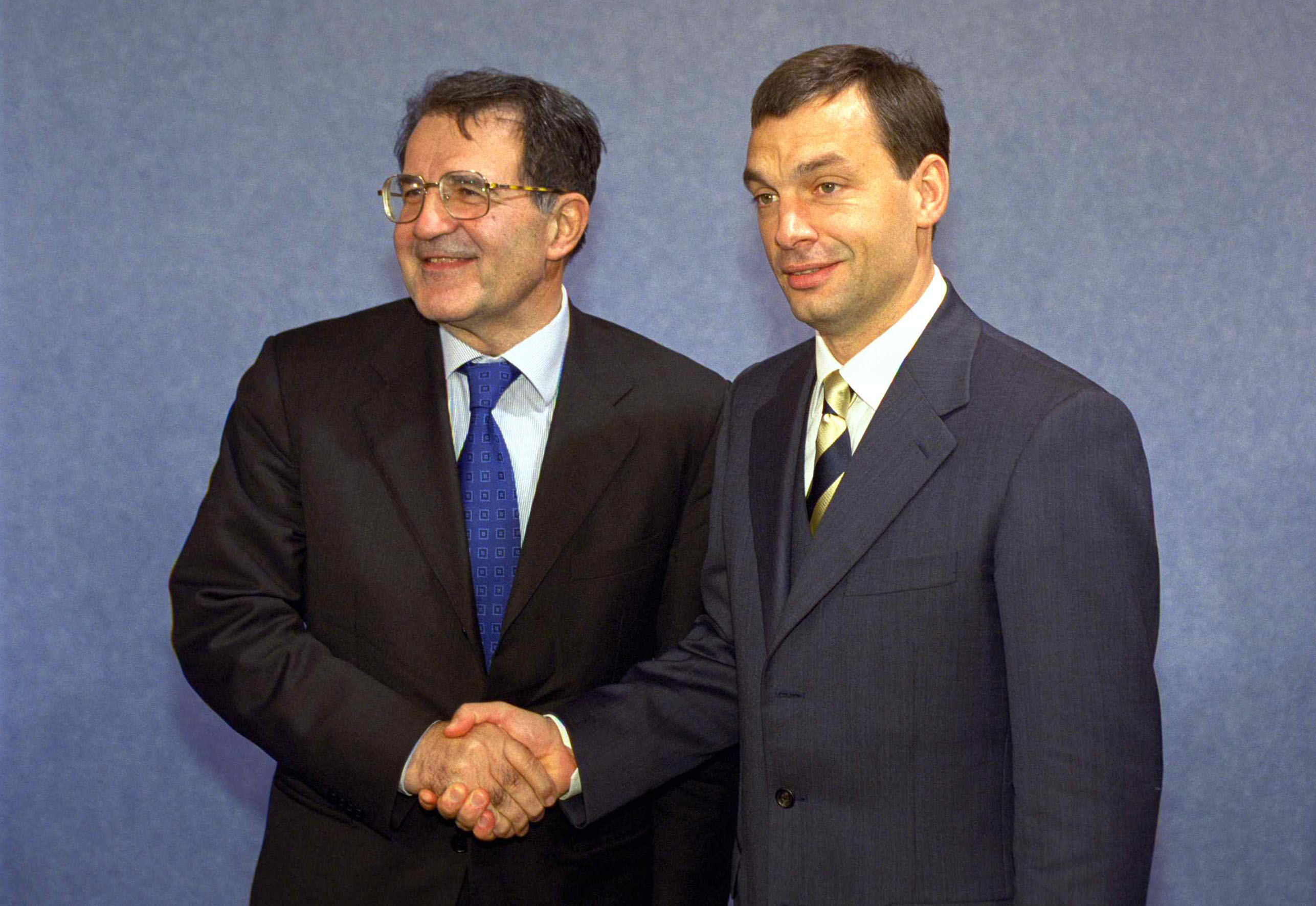
Orbán with Romano Prodi in 1999

In 1998, Orbán formed a coalition with the Hungarian Democratic Forum (MDF) and the Independent Smallholders' Party (FKGP). The coalition won the 1998 parliamentary elections with 42% of the national vote. Orbán became the second youngest prime minister of Hungary at the age of 35 (after András Hegedüs).

In February, the government decided that plenary sessions of the Hungarian Parliament would be held only every third week. Opposition parties strongly opposed the change, arguing that it would reduce parliament's legislative efficiency and ability to supervise the government. In March, the government also tried to replace the National Assembly rule that requires a two-thirds majority vote with one of a simple majority, but the Constitutional Court ruled this unconstitutional.

Two of Orbán's state secretaries in the prime minister's office had to resign in May, due to their implication in a bribery scandal involving the American military manufacturer Lockheed Martin Corporation. Before bidding on a major jet-fighter contract, the two secretaries, along with 32 other deputies of Orbán's party, had sent a letter to two US senators to lobby for the appointment of a Budapest-based Lockheed manager to be the US ambassador to Hungary. The government was also involved in a lengthy dispute with the Budapest City Council over the national government's decision in late 1998 to cancel two major urban projects: the construction of a new national theatre.

Relations between the Fidesz-led coalition government and the opposition worsened in the National Assembly, where the two seemed to have abandoned all attempts at consensus-seeking politics. The government pushed to swiftly replace the heads of key institutions (such as the Hungarian National Bank chairman, the Budapest City Chief Prosecutor, and the Hungarian Radio) with partisan figures. Although the opposition resisted, for example, by delaying their appointing of members of the supervising boards, the government ran the institutions without the stipulated number of directors. In a similar vein, Orbán refused to participate in the parliament's question time for periods of up to 10 months. His statements, such as "The parliament works without opposition too...", also contributed to the image of arrogant and aggressive governance.

A later report in March by the Brussels-based International Federation of Journalists criticized the Hungarian government for improper political influence in the media, as the country's public service broadcaster teetered close to bankruptcy. Numerous political scandals during 2001 led to a de facto, if not actual, breakup of the coalition that held power in Budapest. A bribery scandal in February triggered a wave of allegations and several prosecutions against the Independent Smallholders' Party. The affair resulted in the ousting of József Torgyán from both the FKGP presidency and the top post in the Ministry of Agriculture. The FKGP disintegrated, and more than a dozen of its MPs joined the government faction.

=== Economy ===
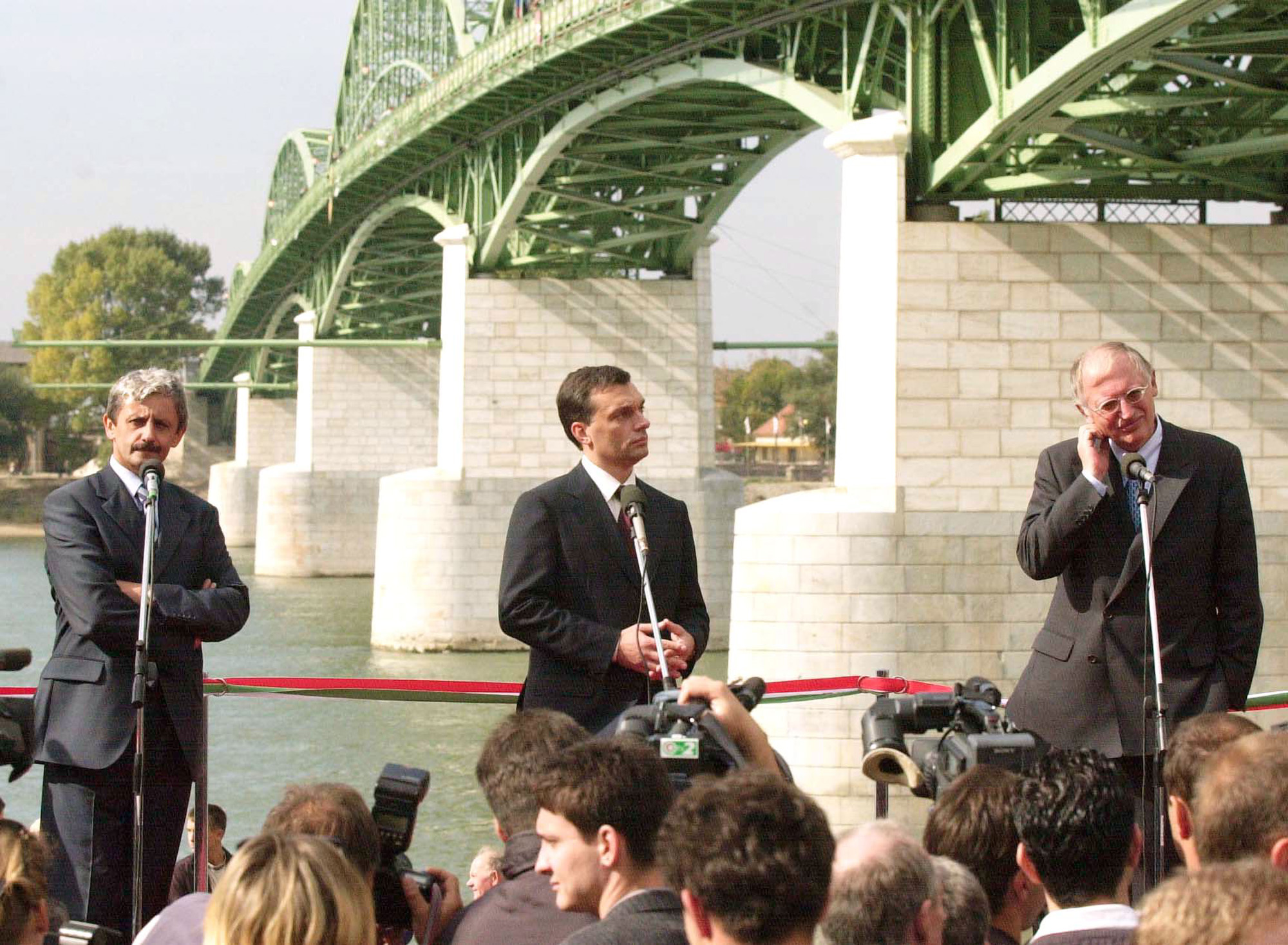
Mikuláš Dzurinda, Orbán, and Günter Verheugen during the opening of the Mária Valéria Bridge across the Danube, connecting the Slovak town of Štúrovo with Esztergom, in Hungary, in November 2001

Orbán's economic policy was aimed at cutting taxes and social insurance contributions, while reducing inflation and unemployment. Among the new government's first measures was abolishing university tuition fees and reintroducing universal maternity benefits. The government announced its intention to continue the Socialist–Liberal stabilization program and pledged to narrow the budget deficit, which had grown to 4.5% of GDP.

Economic successes included a drop in inflation from 15% in 1998 to 7.8% in 2001. Annual GDP growth rates were fairly steady under Orbán's tenure, ranging from 3.8% to 5.2%. The fiscal deficit fell from 3.9% in 1999 to 3.4% in 2001, and the ratio of the national debt decreased to 54% of GDP.

=== Foreign policy ===
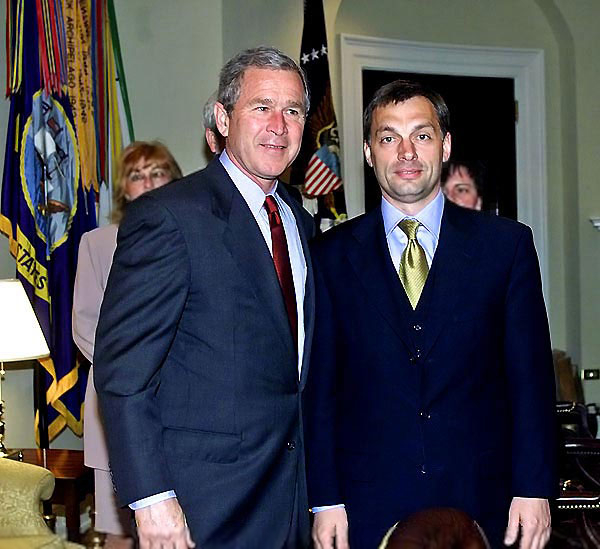
Orbán with George W. Bush at the White House in 2001

In March 1999, after Russian objections were overruled, Hungary joined NATO along with the Czech Republic and Poland. Hungary's NATO membership demanded the country's involvement in the Federal Republic of Yugoslavia's Kosovo crisis and the modernization of its army. NATO membership also dealt a blow to the economy because of a trade embargo imposed on Yugoslavia. However, Orbán noted in 2026 that he had denied a request from U.S. President Bill Clinton to use Hungary to attack Serbian forces based in the Serbian province of Vojvodina.

Hungary attracted international media attention in 1999 for passing the "status law", which addressed the situation of approximately three million members of ethnic Hungarian minorities in neighbouring Romania, Slovakia, Serbia and Montenegro, Croatia, Slovenia, and Ukraine. The law aimed to provide education, health benefits, and employment rights to members of those minorities, and was said to heal the negative effects for Hungarians of the 1920 Trianon Treaty.

Governments in neighbouring states, particularly Romania, claimed to be insulted by the law, which they saw as interference in their domestic affairs. Proponents of the status law countered that several of the countries criticizing the law themselves had similar constructs to provide benefits for their own minorities. Romania acquiesced after amendments following a December 2001 agreement between Orbán and Romanian Prime Minister Adrian Năstase; Slovakia accepted the law after further concessions made by the new government after the 2002 elections.

== Leader of the opposition (2002–2010) ==
The level of public support for political parties generally stagnated, even with general elections coming in 2002. Fidesz and the main opposition Hungarian Socialist Party (MSZP) ran neck to neck according to opinion polls for most of the year, both attracting about 26% of the electorate. According to a September 2001 poll by the Gallup organization, however, support for a joint Fidesz – Hungarian Democratic Forum party list would have support from up to 33% of the voters, with the Socialists drawing 28% and other opposition parties 3% each.

In the event, Orbán's group lost the April parliamentary elections to the opposition Hungarian Socialist Party, which set up a coalition with its longtime ally, the liberal Alliance of Free Democrats. Turnout was a record-high 70.5%. Beyond these parties, only deputies of the Hungarian Democratic Forum made it into the National Assembly. The populist Independent Smallholders' Party and the right-wing Hungarian Justice and Life Party lost all their seats. Thus, the number of political parties in the new assembly was reduced from six to four.

MIÉP challenged the government's legitimacy, demanded a recount, complained of election fraud, and generally kept the country in election mode until the October municipal elections. The socialist-controlled Central Elections Committee ruled that a recount was unnecessary, a position supported by observers from the Organization for Security and Co-operation in Europe, whose only substantive criticism of the election conduct was that the state television carried a consistent bias in favour of Fidesz.

In the 2004 European Parliament election, the ruling Hungarian Socialist Party was heavily defeated by the opposition conservative Fidesz. Fidesz gained 47.4% of the vote and 12 of Hungary's 24 seats.

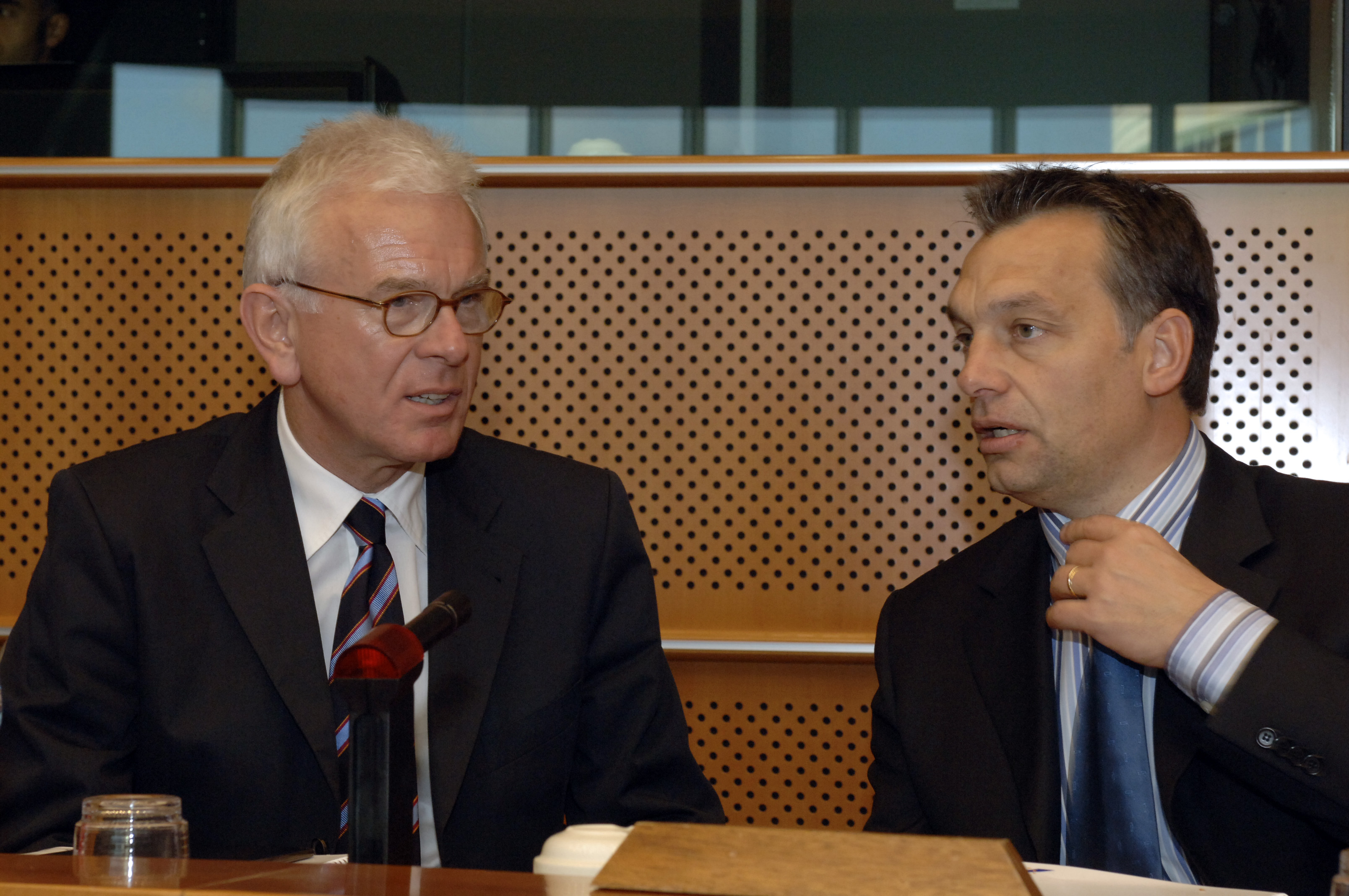
Orbán and Hans-Gert Pöttering in 2006

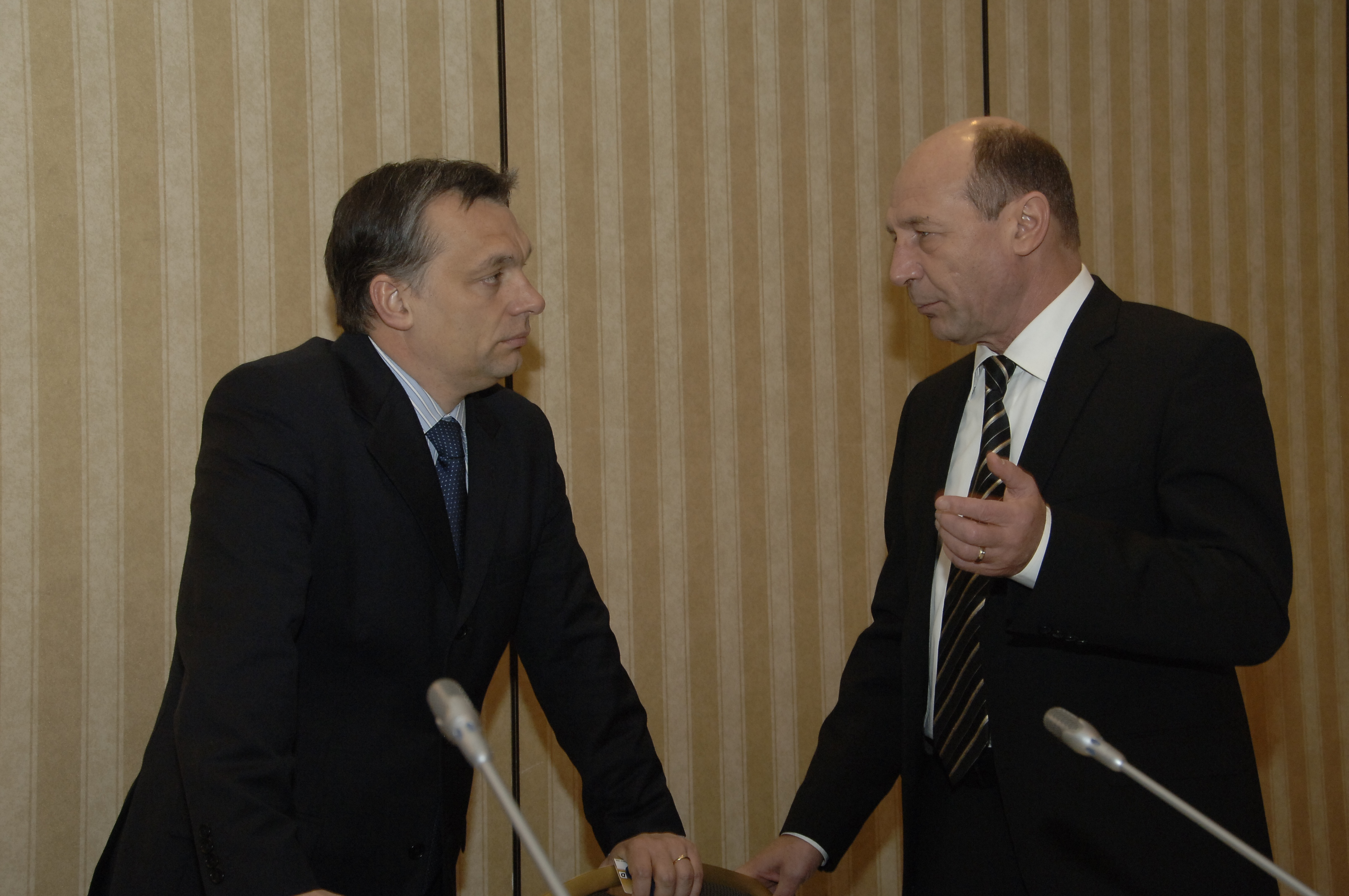
Orbán and Romanian President Traian Băsescu in 2008

Orbán was the Fidesz candidate for the parliamentary election in 2006. Fidesz and its new-old candidate failed again to gain a majority in this election, which initially put Orbán's future political career as the leader of Fidesz in question. However, after fighting with the Socialist-Liberal coalition, Orbán's position resolidified, and he was elected president of Fidesz for yet another term in May 2007.

On 1 November, Orbán and his party announced their plans to stage several large-scale demonstrations across Hungary on the anniversary of the Soviet suppression of the 1956 Revolution. The events were intended to serve as a memorial to the victims of the Soviet invasion and a protest against police brutality during the 23 October unrest in Budapest. Planned events included a candlelight vigil march across Budapest. However, the demonstrations were small and petered out by the end of the year.

Orban condemned Russia's invasion of Georgia in 2008:

It is the duty of Central European peoples, when an independent country is subjected to military aggression, to speak out clearly and unequivocally.

On 1 October 2006, Fidesz won the municipal elections, which counterbalanced the MSZP-led government's power to some extent. Fidesz won 15 of 23 mayoralties in Hungary's largest cities—although it narrowly lost Budapest to the Liberal Party—and majorities in 18 of 20 regional assemblies.

On 9 March 2008, a national referendum took place on revoking government reforms which introduced doctor fees per visit and medical fees paid per number of days spent in hospital, as well as tuition fees in higher education. Fidesz initiated the referendum against the ruling MSZP. The procedure for the referendum started on 23 October 2006, when Orbán announced they would hand in seven questions to the National Electorate Office, three of which (on abolishing copayments, daily fees, and college tuition fees) were officially approved on 17 December 2007 and called on 24 January 2008. The referendum passed, a significant victory for Fidesz.

In the 2009 European Parliament election, Fidesz won by a large margin, garnering 56.36% of votes and 14 of Hungary's 22 seats. 17 years later, Fidesz lost to Tisza, making Orbán as the opposition leader of Hungary.

== Second premiership (2010–2026) ==
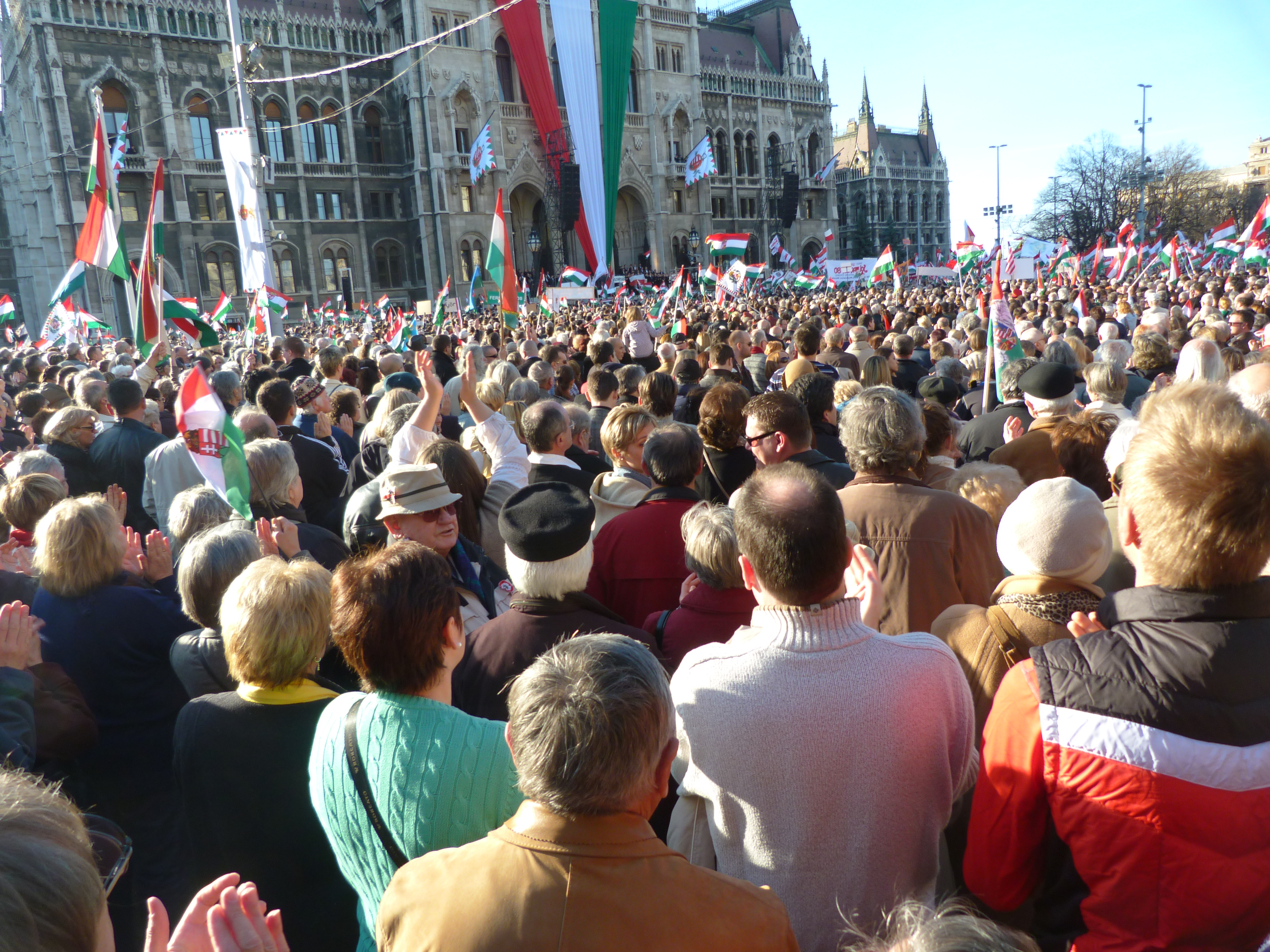
"Hungarians won't live according to the commands of foreign powers", Orbán told the crowd at Kossuth Square on 15 March 2012.

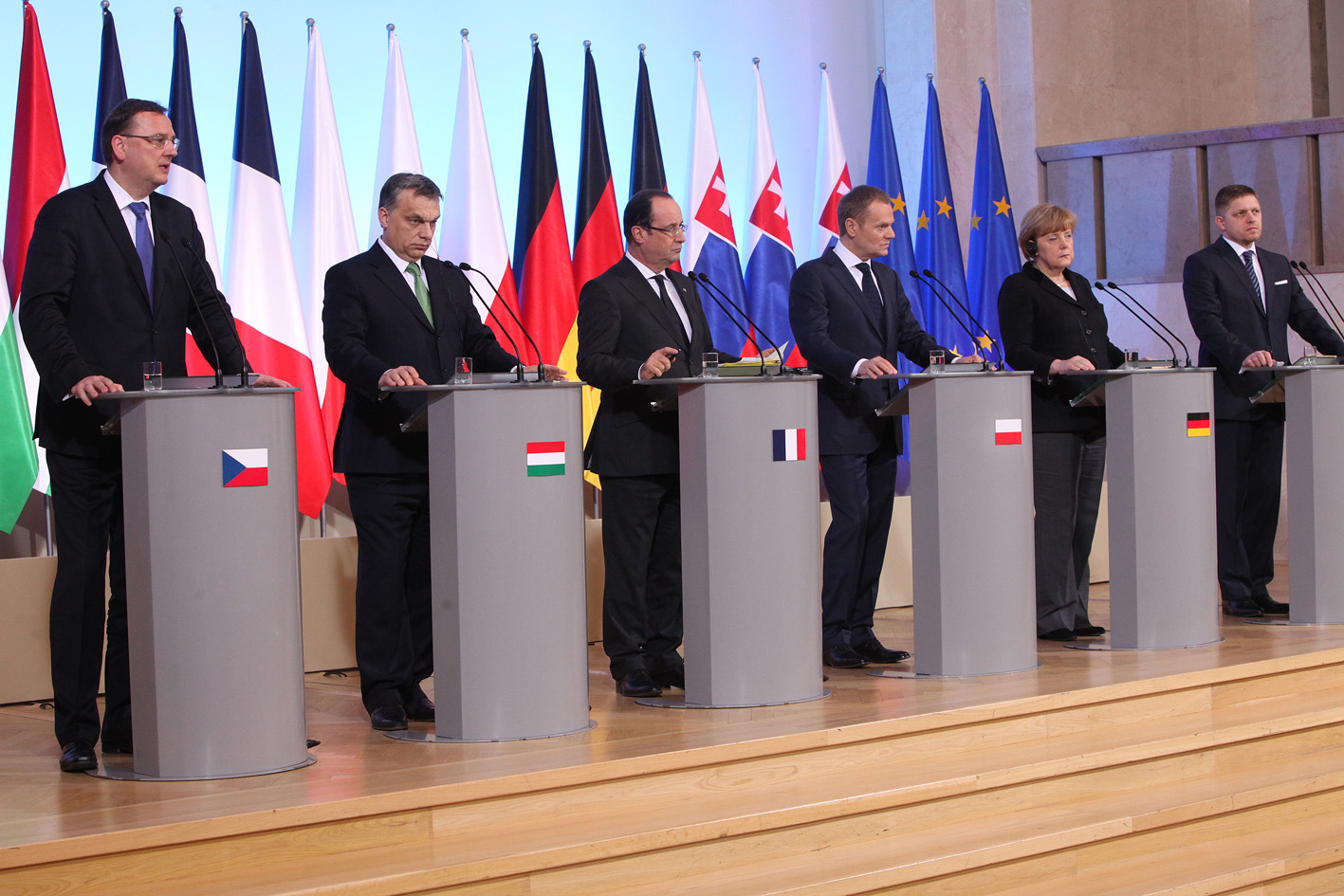
Orbán (2nd from the left) at a press conference following the meeting of leaders of the Visegrád Group, Germany, and France on 6 March 2013

=== Second government (2010–2014) ===
In the 2010 parliamentary elections, Orbán's party won 52.7% of the popular vote but received a 68% majority of parliamentary seats due to the design of the post-communist electoral system. A two-thirds parliamentary majority is enough to change the constitution, and in 2011 Orbán's government drafted a new constitution behind closed doors, debated it for only nine days in the parliament, and passed it on a party line. Orbán rejected suggestions within his party to pursue a more cautious agenda. He would go on to amend the constitution twelve times in his first year in office. Among other changes, it includes support for traditional values, nationalism, references to Christianity, and a controversial electoral reform, which decreased the number of seats in the Parliament of Hungary from 386 to 199. The new constitution entered into force on 1 January 2012, replacing the Hungarian Constitution of 1949.

In 2012, Orbán's government implemented a flat tax on personal income set at 16%. Orbán has called his government "pragmatic", citing restrictions on early retirement in the police force and military, making welfare more transparent, and a central banking law that "gives Hungary more independence from the European Central Bank."

On 14 January 2014, Orbán went to Moscow in order to sign with Vladimir Putin an agreement on the Paks II nuclear power plant (NPP). The Russian state-owned enterprise Rosatom would develop the NPP, and Hungary was to finance the plant by borrowing from Russia. At the same time, Orbán reassured everyone that the South Stream pipeline would be completed soon. The BBC complained that "there was no formal bidding process for the plant's expansion, and the terms of the loan agreement have not yet been made public," even after the Hungarian parliament approved the deal on 6 February. It later came to light that the loan amounted to €8bn and was financed over a 30-year term. Hungarian MFA Peter Szijjarto told reporters that the deal was "the business (transaction) of the century." Westinghouse and Areva, two Western prime contractors, had been lured since 2012 by the Hungarian civil service but eventually had been frozen out of competition by the Orbán government, which chose to sole-source the deal.

=== Third government (2014–2018) ===
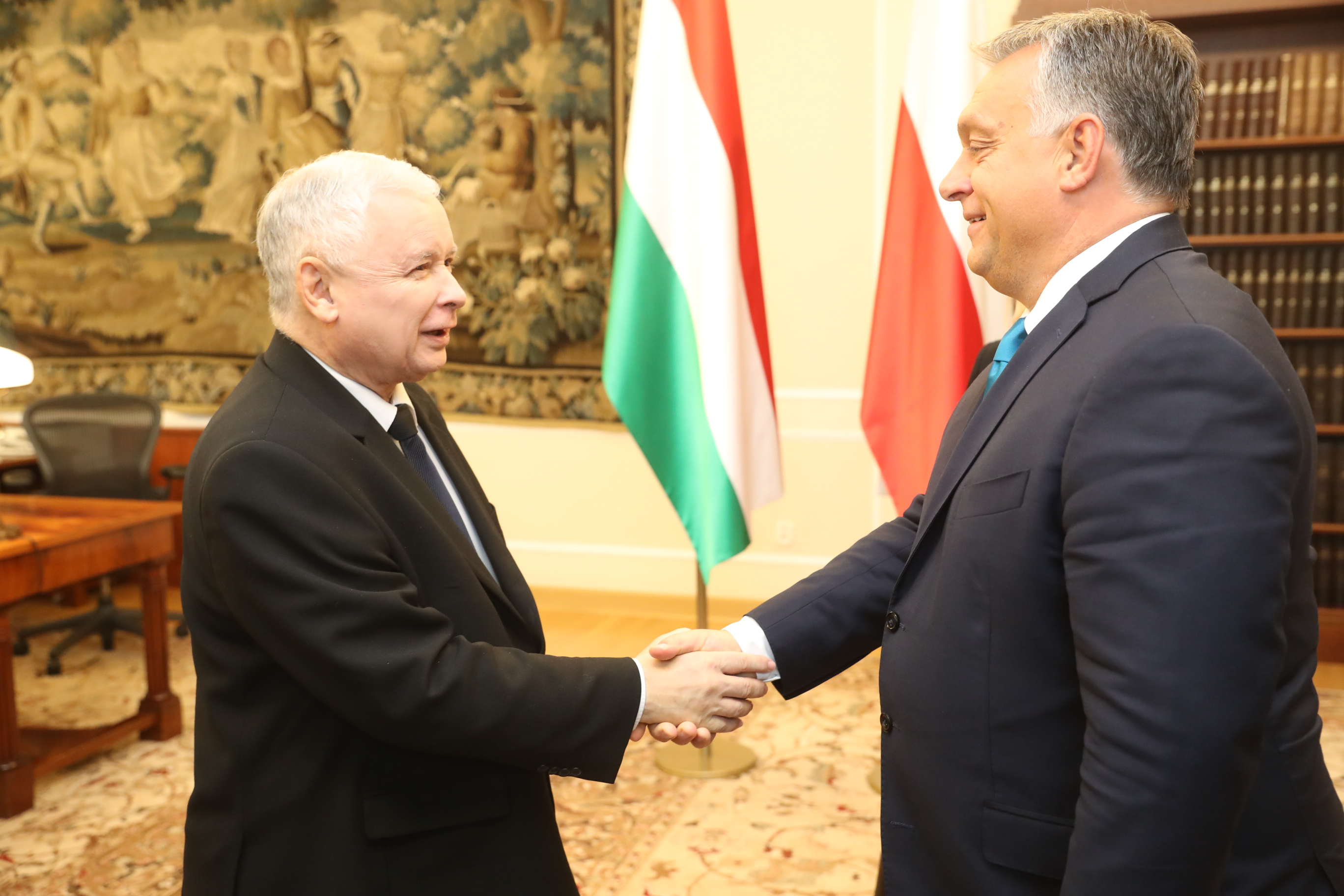
Poland's Law and Justice (PiS) leader Jarosław Kaczyński with Orbán on 22 September 2017

After the April 2014 parliamentary election, Fidesz won a majority, garnering 133 of the 199 seats in the National Assembly. While Orbán's party won a large majority, it received 44.5% of the national vote, 8.7% less than in 2010.

In a speech in July 2014 in Băile Tușnad, a remote village in Romania, at the Bálványos Free Summer University and Student Camp, Orbán first publicly articulated an ideology of illiberalism. He described the Western 2008 financial crisis as a paradigm shift of the international order, comparable with the two world wars and the dissolution of the Soviet Union. Orbán described his current mission: "while breaking with the [liberal] dogmas and ideologies that have been adopted by the West and keeping ourselves independent from them, we are trying to find the form of community organisation, the new Hungarian state, which is capable of making our community competitive in the great global race for decades to come."

In November 2014, Orbán proposed a controversial "internet tax" amid corruption accusations. That same year, there were numerous protests against his government, including one in Budapest in November 2014 against the proposed "internet tax".

During the 2015 European migrant crisis, Orbán ordered the erection of the Hungary–Serbia barrier to block the entry of illegal immigrants so that Hungary could register all the migrants arriving from Serbia, which is the country's responsibility under the Dublin Regulation, a European Union law. Under Orbán, Hungary took numerous actions to combat illegal immigration and effectively reduced the influx of refugees. In May 2020, the European Court of Justice ruled against Hungary's policy of migrant transit zones, which Orbán subsequently abolished while also tightening the country's asylum rules.

Like other Visegrád Group heads of state, Orbán opposes any compulsory EU long-term quota on the redistribution of migrants. According to him, Turkey should be considered a safe third country for unwanted immigrants or refugees.

In 2015, Orbán wrote in the Frankfurter Allgemeine Zeitung: "Europe's response is madness. We must acknowledge that the European Union's misguided immigration policy is responsible for this situation." He also demanded an official EU list of "safe countries" to which migrants can be returned.

He proposed 6 points to the European Union to tackle the crisis:

1. Joint surveillance of the Greek borders to prevent migration from continuing illegally
2. The separation of refugees and economic immigrants prior to their entrance to the Schengen area
3. All EU Member States and countries it judges to be as such should be considered Safe States (a state which complies with the 1951 Refugee Convention) to be able to accept refugees on paper.
4. Every member should increase their contributions by at least 1% and reduce their expenditure by 1%. This would raise €3 billion for crisis management and refugee aid.
5. Work with Ankara and Moscow to manage the wave [coming from Syria] (This was also approved by D.C.)
6. The creation of a world quota (not obligatory), but calling on all developed countries to accept refugees on a proportional basis.

All but one of these points were voted through by the Parliament in September 2015 (the surveillance of the archipelago was left to the Hellenic Armed Forces).

=== Fourth government (2018–2022) ===
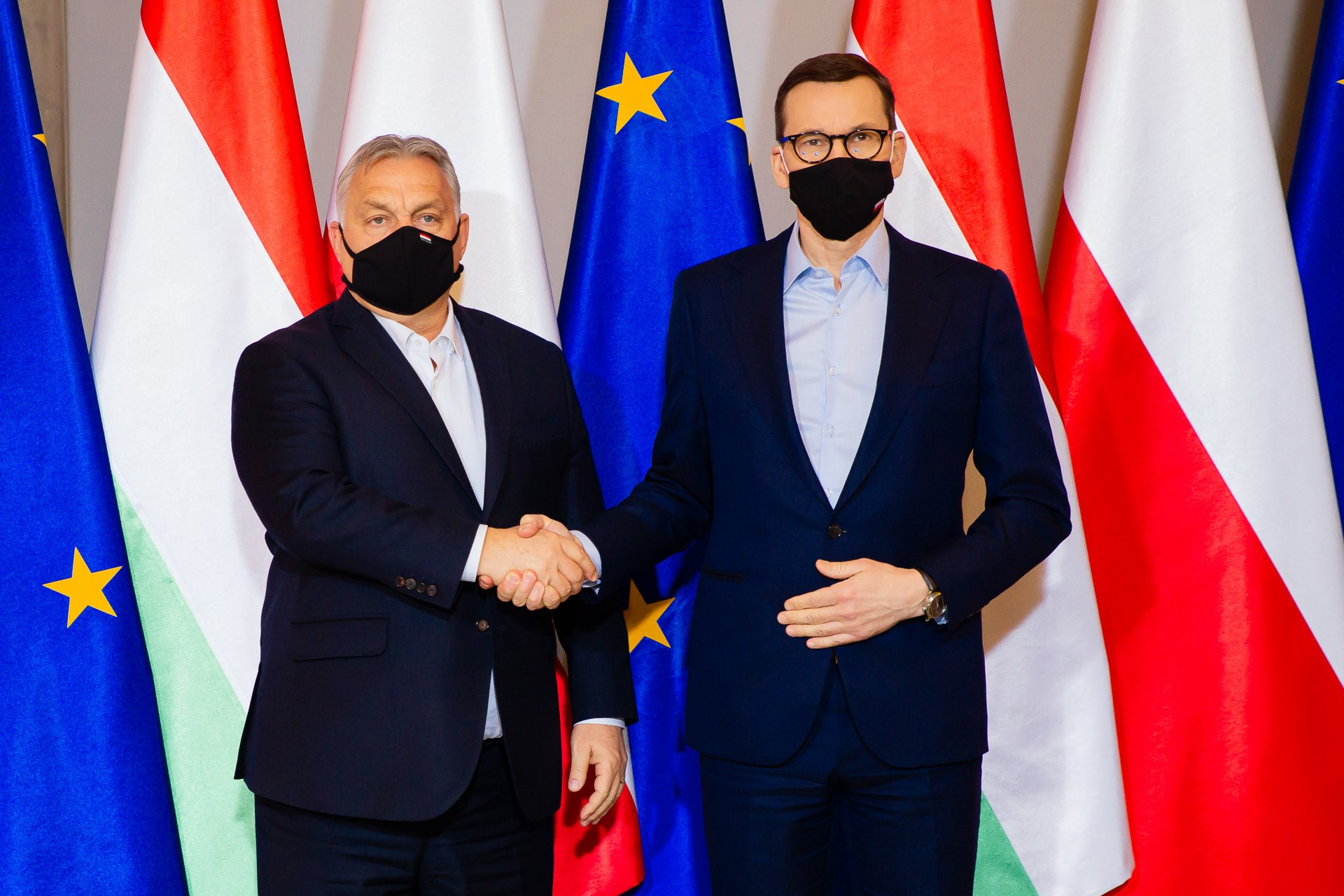
Orbán and Polish Prime Minister Mateusz Morawiecki in December 2021

In the April 2018 Hungarian parliamentary election, the Fidesz–KDNP alliance was victorious and preserved its two-thirds majority, with Orbán remaining prime minister. Orbán and Fidesz campaigned primarily on the issues of immigration and foreign meddling, and the election outcome was seen as a victory for right-wing populism in Europe.

In a 2018 speech at the meeting of a municipal association, Orbán stated, "We must state that we do not want to be diverse and do not want to be mixed: we do not want our own colour, traditions and national culture to be mixed with those of others. We do not want this. We do not want that at all. We do not want to be a diverse country."

On 30 March 2020, the Hungarian parliament voted 137 to 53 in favor of passing legislation that would create a state of emergency without a time limit, grant the prime minister the ability to rule by decree, suspend by-elections, and introduce the possibility of prison sentences for spreading fake news and sanctions for leaving quarantine. Two and a half months later, on 16 June 2020, the Hungarian parliament passed a bill that ended the state of emergency effective 19 June. However, on the same day the parliament passed a new law removing the requirement of parliamentary approval for future "medical" states of emergencies, allowing the government to declare them by decree.

In 2021, the parliament transferred control of 11 state universities to foundations led by allies of Orbán. The Mathias Corvinus Collegium, a residential college, received an influx of government funds and assets equal to about 1% of Hungary's gross domestic product, reportedly as part of a mission to train future conservative intellectuals.

Due to a combination of unfavourable conditions and irresponsible decisions, which involved devastating nuclear power phase-out (especially in Belgium, Germany, Spain, and Switzerland), soaring demand for natural gas, its diminished supply from Russia and Norway to the European markets, and the inability of renewable energy sources (such as wind, water, and solar energy) to generate enough power, Europe faced steep increases in energy prices in 2021. In October 2021, Orbán blamed a record-breaking surge in energy prices on the European Commission's Green Deal plans.

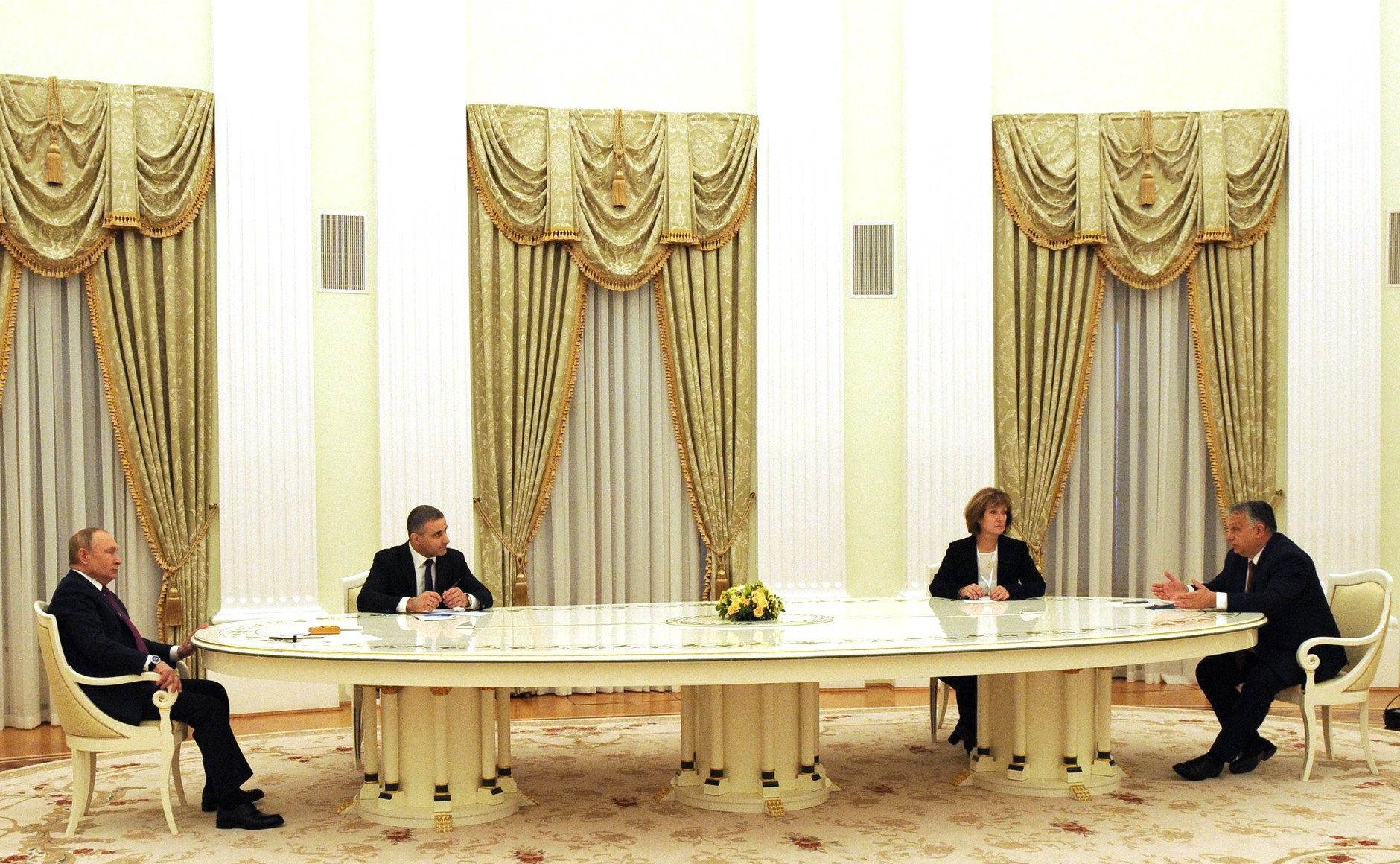
Russian President Vladimir Putin with Viktor Orbán in the Kremlin on 1 February 2022

Despite the anti-immigration rhetoric from Orbán, Hungary increased the immigration of foreign workers into the country as of 2019 to address a labor shortage.

In February 2020, Orbán was interviewed by Christopher DeMuth at the National Conservatism Conference in Rome.

In July 2020, Orbán expressed that he still expects arguments over linking of disbursement of funds of the European Union to rule-of-law criteria, but remarked in a state radio interview that they "didn't win the war, we (they) won an important battle." In August 2020, Orbán, whilst speaking at an event to inaugurate a monument commemorating the Treaty of Trianon, said Central European nations should come together to preserve their Christian roots as Western Europe experiments with same-sex families, immigration, and atheism.

In a 2021 speech, Orbán said, "The challenge with Bosnia is how to integrate a country with 2 million Muslims." Several senior Bosniak politicians responded by calling on Bosnia's government to cancel Orbán's visit to Sarajevo. Additionally, the head of the Islamic Community in Bosnia and Herzegovina, Husein Kavazović, characterized his statement as "xenophobic and racist".

=== Fifth government (2022–2026) ===
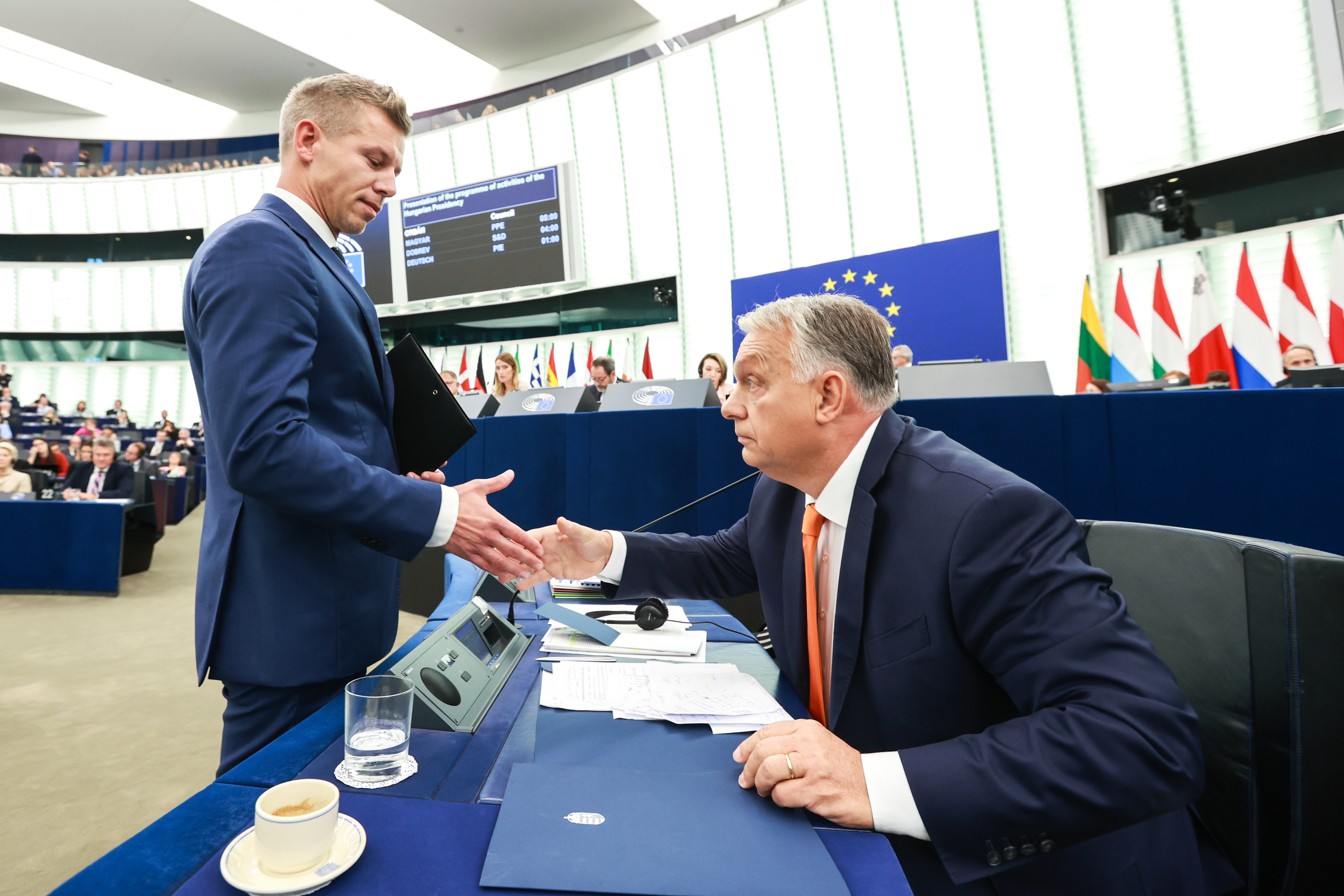
Orbán and Leader of the Opposition Péter Magyar in 2024

In the April 2022 parliamentary election, Fidesz won a majority, garnering 135 of the 199 seats in the National Assembly. While Orbán's close ties with Moscow raised concerns, core Fidesz voters were persuaded that mending ties with the EU might also lead Hungary into war. The Organisation for Security and Cooperation in Europe dispatched a full-scale monitoring mission for the election. Orbán declared victory on Sunday night, with partial results showing his Fidesz party leading the vote by a wide margin. Addressing his supporters after the partial results, Orbán said: "We won a victory so big that you can see it from the moon, and you can certainly see it from Brussels." Opposition leader Péter Márki-Zay admitted defeat shortly after Orbán's speech.

In May 2022, Orbán promoted the Great Replacement conspiracy theory in a speech.

In July 2022, Orbán – repeating the thesis of Jean Raspail – spoke in Romania against the "mixing" of European and non-European races, adding, "We [Hungarians] are not a mixed race and we do not want to become a mixed race." In Vienna two days later, he clarified that he was talking about cultures and not about race.

In December 2022, The European Commission announced it would hold back all 22 billion euros of EU cohesion funds for Hungary until its government meets conditions related to judiciary independence, academic freedoms, LGBTQI rights and the asylum system.

In 2023, Orbán criticized the EU's New Pact on Migration and Asylum, saying, "Unity is dead, secure borders are no more." In 2024, Orbán said that immigration to Europe would disintegrate the European Union and called it an "existential issue" for the EU. He blamed the European Commission and the European Parliament for the situation and warned that Hungary was "ready" to file a lawsuit against the von der Leyen Commission. Orbán called for a better return policy, stating that "In 2023, a decision was made to return 430,000 illegal migrants from EU countries, and just 84,000 have been returned so far."

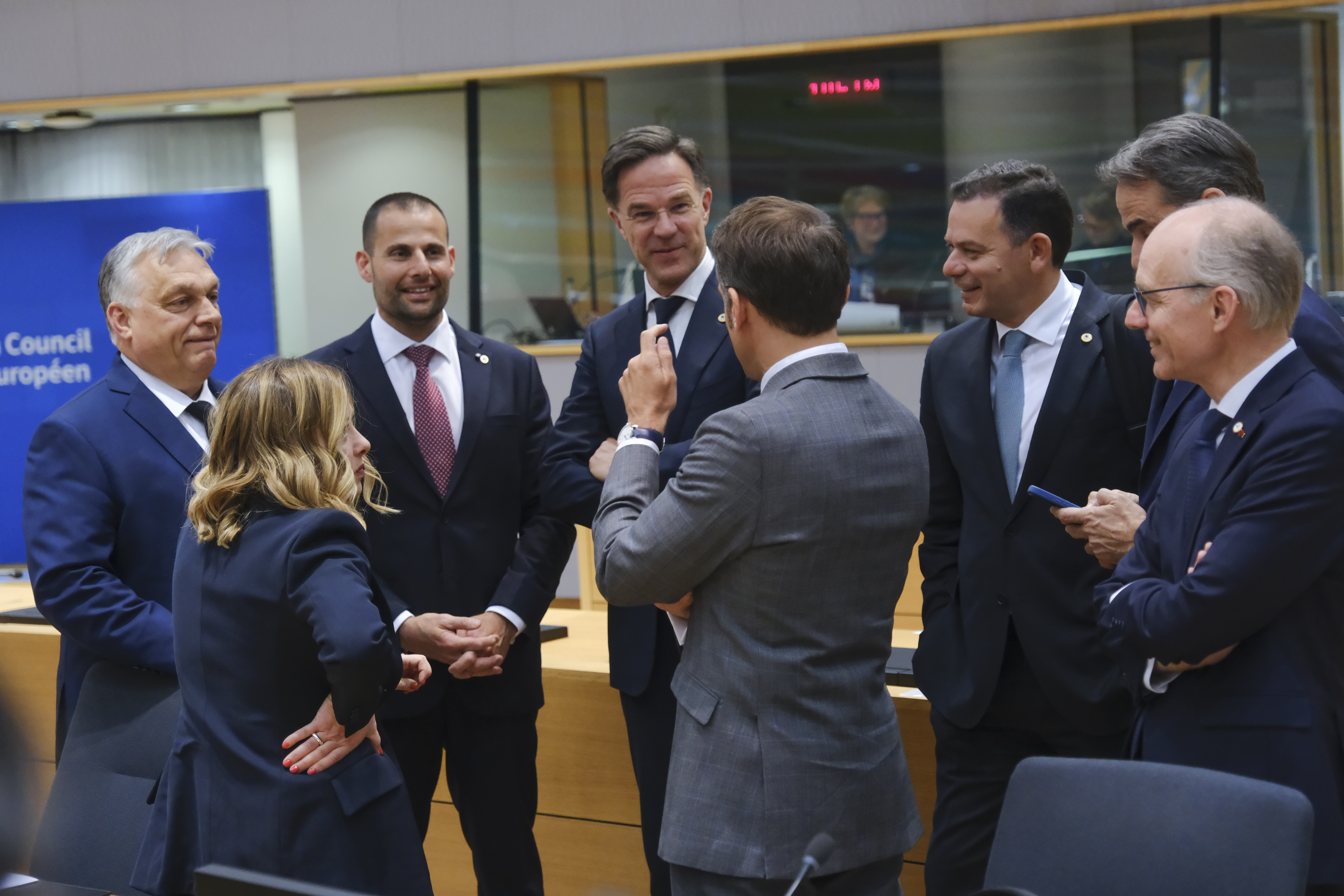
Orbán with European leaders at the European Council in April 2024

In June 2024, Hungary was fined 200 million euros, in addition to a daily one-million-euro fine by the European Court of Justice for "deliberately evading” compliance with European Union laws on migration and asylum seekers. Orban called the fines "outrageous and unacceptable." He refused to pay the and the EU underwent the process of clawing back previously allocated funding as a result.

In July 2024, Zelenskyy decided to shut down the overland pipeline transfer of petroleum products from Russia to Hungary. Orbán and his government protested this event strenuously. When Croatia suggested that Hungary could use the Adria oil pipeline, Orbán refused, and his foreign minister said that it was unreliable.

In October 2024, as the Premier of Hungary was invited to address the European Parliament as part of Hungary's six-month presidency of the European Council. Peter Magyar, Manfred Weber, Valerie Hayer, and Moritz Koerner amongst others lined up to berate him. During the European Parliament session, Ursula von der Leyen criticized Orbán, accusing him of failing to support Ukraine and mismanaging Hungary's economy. She highlighted the contrast between Orbán's current stance and the bravery of Hungarian "freedom fighters" in 1956, questioning the rationale of blaming Ukraine for the war. Additionally, MEP Péter Magyar criticized Orbán's government for corruption and declining living standards.

In April 2026, Orbán has been accused of planting a "false flag" operation after a bomb was found next to the Balkan Stream pipeline. Balkan Stream supplies gas from Russia to Hungary, Serbia and Bulgaria. The explosives were found in two sacks in Kanjiza, Serbia on the border with Hungary. Orbán described it as "act of sabotage" by Ukraine noting that "Ukraine has been trying to cut Europe off from Russian energy for years". Orbán had previously accused Ukraine of not repairing the Druzhba pipeline for oil from Russia to Hungary and other countries. Ukraine and Hungarian opposition said its more likely the bomb incident is a fabrication in order to improve the chances of success in the parliamentary election scheduled for Sunday 12 April 2026.

=== 2026 parliamentary election ===
Orbán ran for the fifth time for Prime Minister of Hungary, against Péter Magyar of the Tisza Party. Voting officially ended at 19:00.

At 21:31, Orbán conceded defeat to Magyar after 16 years as Prime Minister of Hungary. Orbán said "The responsibility and opportunity to govern were not given to us." Orbán also said "We are not giving up. Never, never, never."

On April 25, 2026 after the defeat in the Parliamentary elections, Orbán said he would leave his Parliament seat but hoped to remain as head of Fidesz. Orbán's Chief of Staff Gergely Gulyás would become the leader of the opposition in the Parliament. Following Magyar's ascension to the prime ministry, the Parliament adopted a constitutional amendment limiting the position to two terms, effectively prohibiting Orbán from further returns to the office.

== Post-premiership (2026–present) ==
On 13 June 2026, a Fidesz party congress re-elected Orbán as party leader for a further year, with 729 of 737 delegates voting in favour and no other candidate standing. His political future had been in question after the defeat, and he had faced open criticism from some former loyalists urging him to leave politics, the first such criticism since he returned to power in 2010. Telling the congress "I do not give up, I never, never, never, never, never give up", Orbán took full responsibility for the election result and said Fidesz had been a "fantastic governing party" but needed to change in order to function as an opposition party capable of governing again.

On 21 July 2026, prosecutors and officers of the national tax authority raided offices housing data servers used by Fidesz as part of an investigation by the Bács-Kiskun County chief prosecutor's office into the suspected misuse of about 17 billion forints (US$53.5 million) in grant money from Hungary's National Cultural Fund during Orbán's time in government. Six current and former officials, not including Orbán, had been charged in connection with the case and denied wrongdoing; they were accused of distributing the money opaquely to artists and performers linked to Fidesz. The party said the raid had been carried out "without prior notice" and with the intention of seizing its entire communications system, and accused the governing Tisza Party of seeking to destroy it by legal means.

On September 2026, Fidesz's parliamentary leader János Bóka said that if Fidesz wins in the 2030 elections and is given the mandate to change, remove the constitutional amendment limiting the prime minister position to two terms, effectively prohibiting Orbán from further returns to the office, this would "open up further possibilities" for Orbán's return.

On 25 October 2026, citing sources from officials in the United States, China and Russia, the editorial board at The Wall Street Journal reported that the Trump administration had advocated Orbán as a joint candidate for the three countries in the 2026 United Nations Secretary-General selection, with China and Russia reportedly being supportive. It reported that an announcement was waiting for the 2026 US midterm elections and that Orbán was receptive to the idea, though he had reservations and wanted confidence he could win.

== Views ==
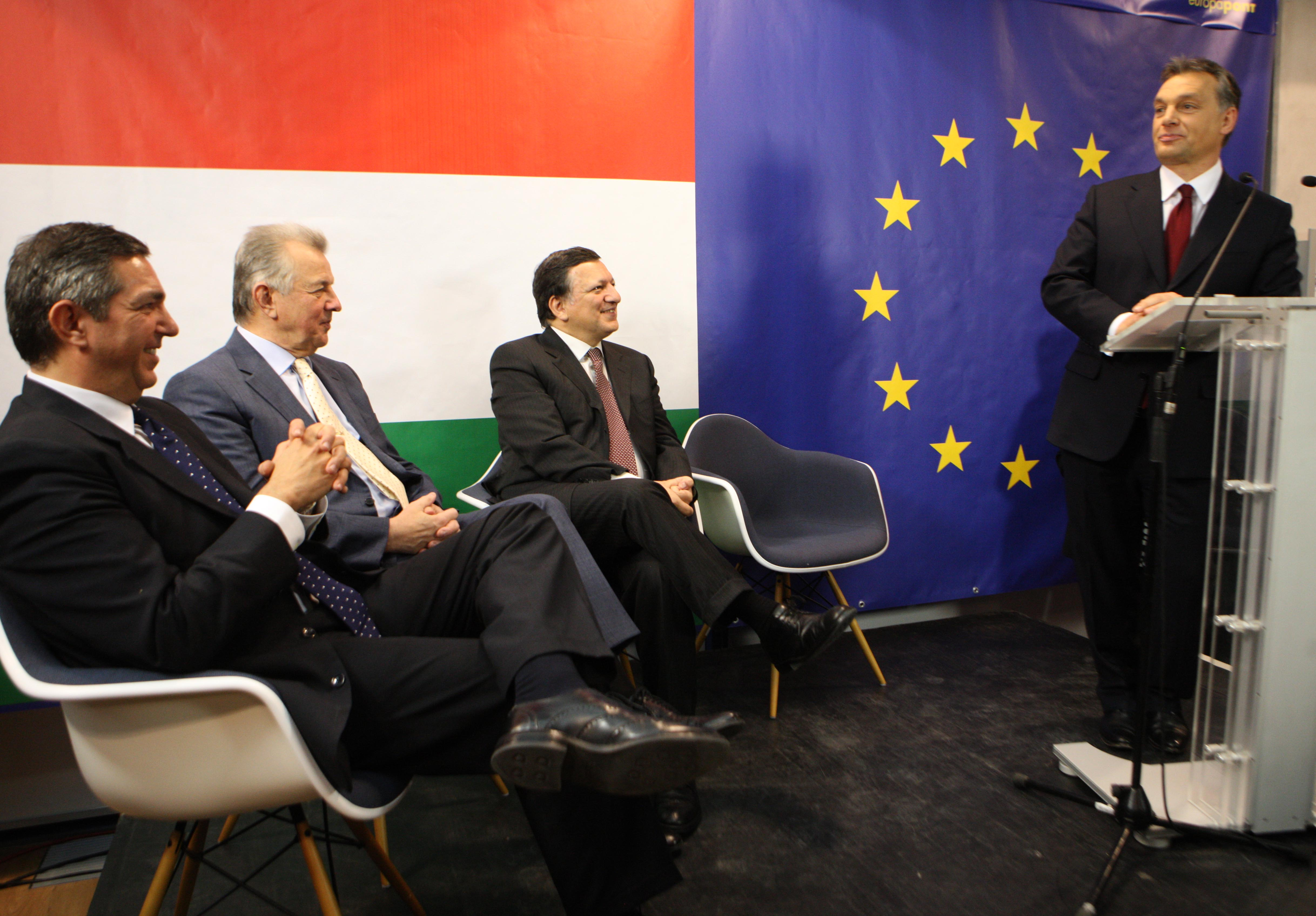
Orbán with José Manuel Barroso and Stavros Lambrinidis in January 2011

Orbán's blend of soft Euroscepticism, populism, and national conservatism has seen him compared to politicians and political parties as diverse as Jarosław Kaczyński's Law and Justice, Silvio Berlusconi's Forza Italia, Matteo Salvini's Lega (previously Lega Nord), Marine Le Pen's National Rally, Donald Trump, Recep Tayyip Erdoğan, and Vladimir Putin. Orbán has sought to make Hungary an "ideological center for ... an international conservative movement".

According to Politico, Orbán's political philosophy "echoes the resentments of what were once the peasant and working classes" by promoting an "uncompromising defense of national sovereignty and a transparent distrust of Europe's ruling establishments". Orbán frequently emphasizes the importance of Christianity, although he and the overwhelming majority of Hungarians do not attend church regularly. His authoritarian appeal to "global conservatives" has been summarized by Lauren Stokes as: "I alone can save you from the ravages of Islamization and totalitarian progressivism – and in the face of all that, who has time for checks and balances and rules?". Orbán has criticized the EU, comparing it to forces that have occupied Hungary throughout history.

Orbán had a close relationship with the Israeli Prime Minister Benjamin Netanyahu, having known him for decades. He is described as "one of Mr Netanyahu's closest allies in Europe". Orbán received personal advice on economic reforms from Netanyahu, while the latter was Finance Minister of Israel (2003–2005). In February 2019, Netanyahu thanked Orbán for "deciding to extend the embassy of Hungary in Israel to Jerusalem".

Orbán is seen as having laid out his political views most concretely in a widely cited 2014 public address at Băile Tușnad (known in Hungary as the Tusnádfürdői beszéd, or "Tusnádfürdő speech"). In the address, Orbán repudiated the classical liberal theory of the state as a free association of atomistic individuals, arguing for the use of the state as the means of organizing, invigorating, or even constructing the national community. Although this kind of state respects traditionally liberal concepts like civic rights, it is properly called "illiberal" because it views the community, and not the individual, as the basic political unit. In practice, Orbán claimed, such a state should promote national self-sufficiency, national sovereignty, familialism, full employment and the preservation of cultural heritage.

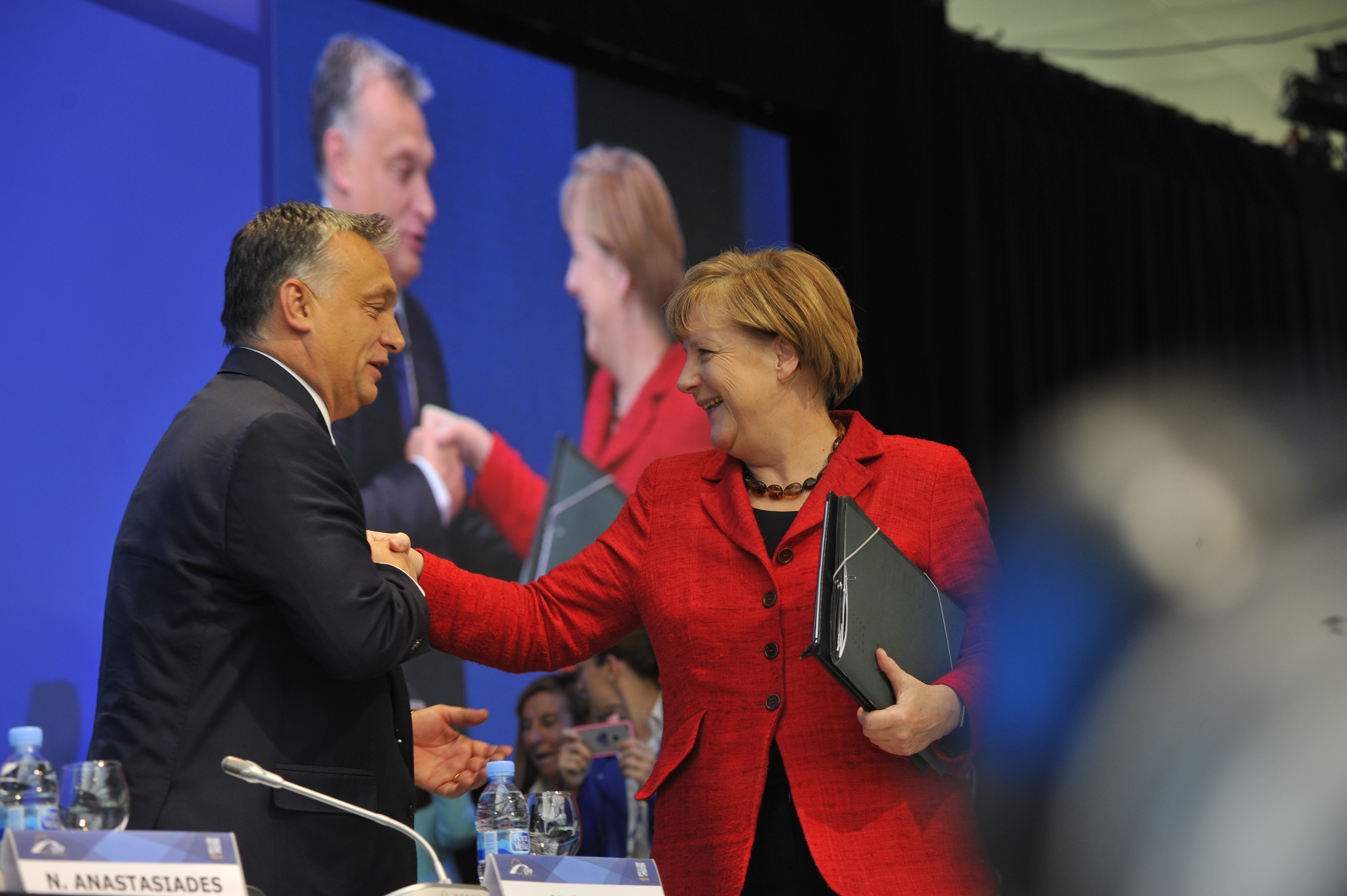
Orbán and Angela Merkel, Congress of the European People's Party in Madrid on 21 October 2015

Orbán's second and third premierships have been the subject of significant international controversy, and reception of his political views is mixed. The 2011 constitutional changes enacted under his leadership were, in particular, accused of centralizing legislative and executive power, curbing civil liberties, restricting freedom of speech, and weakening the Constitutional Court and judiciary. For these reasons, critics have described him as an "irredentist", a "right-wing populist", an "authoritarian", "far-right", a "fascist", "autocratic", a "Putinist", a "strongman", and a "dictator".

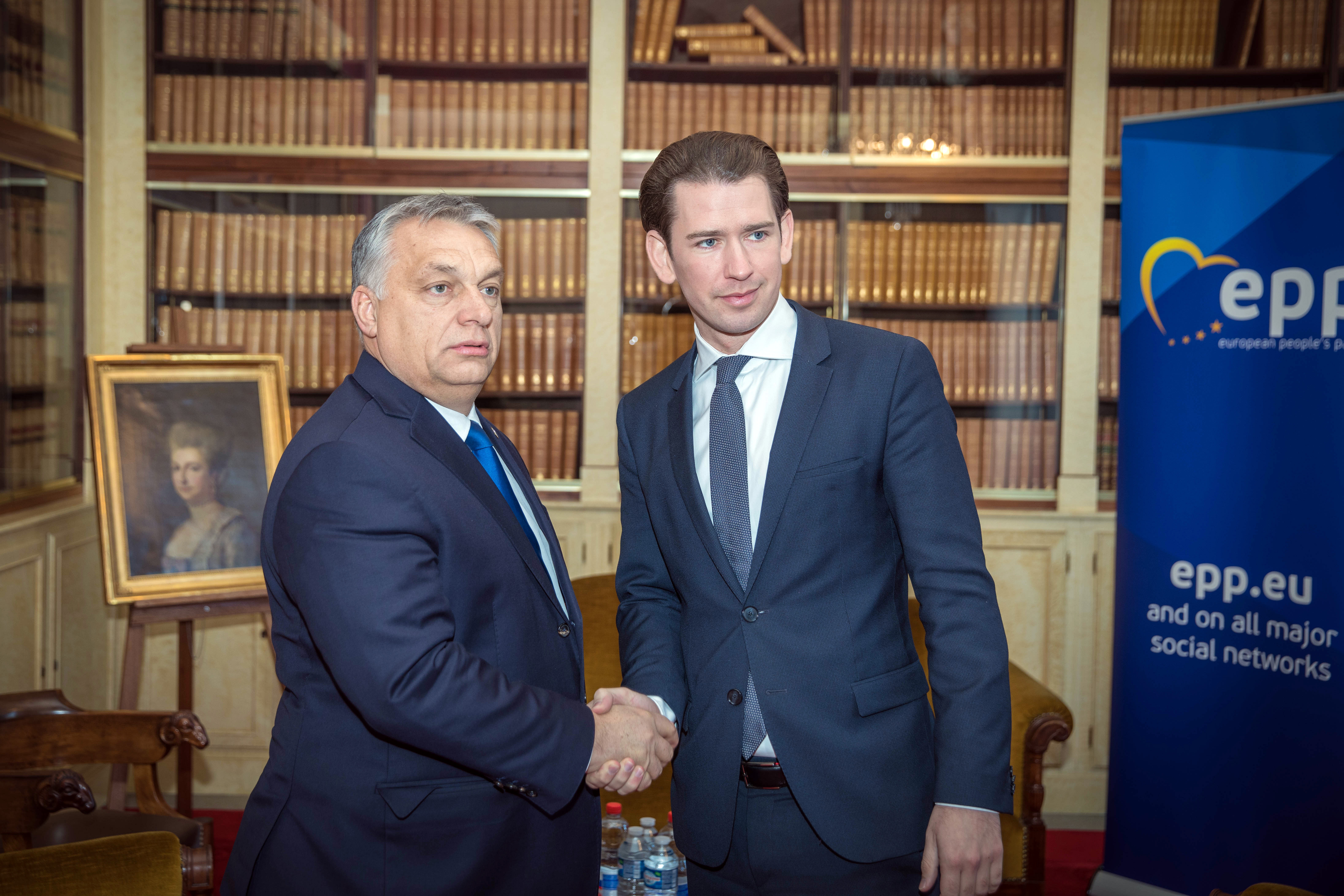
Orbán and Austrian Chancellor Sebastian Kurz on 13 December 2018

The European migrant crisis, coupled with continued Islamist terrorism in the European Union, has popularized Orbán's nationalist, protectionist policies among European conservative leaders. "Once ostracized" by Europe's political elite, writes Politico, Orbán "is now the talisman of Europe's mainstream right".

Orbán has promoted the Great Replacement conspiracy theory. In a 2018 speech, he stated: "I think there are many people who would like to see the end of Christian Europe, and they believe that if they replace its cultural subsoil, if they bring in millions of people from new ethnic groups which are not rooted in Christian culture, then they will transform Europe according to their conception."

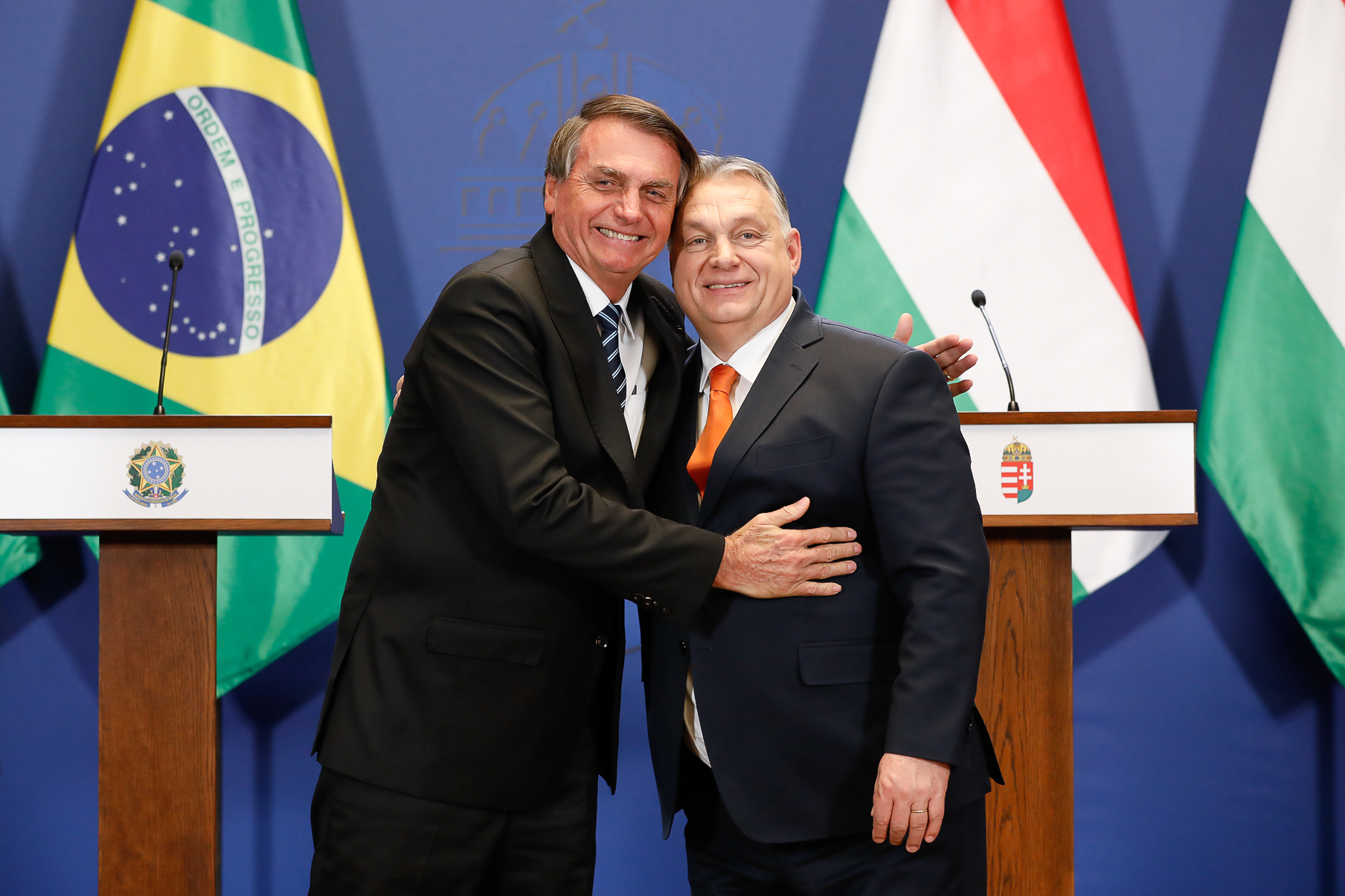
Orbán and Brazilian President Jair Bolsonaro in Budapest on 17 February 2022

During a press conference in January 2019, Orbán praised Brazil's then president Jair Bolsonaro, saying that currently "the most apt definition of modern Christian democracy can be found in Brazil, not in Europe".

In support of Orbán and his ideas, a think tank called the Danube Institute was established in 2013, funded by the Batthyány Foundation, which in turn is "funded entirely by the Hungarian government". Batthyány "sponsors international conferences and three periodicals, all in English: European Conservative, Hungarian Review, and Hungarian Conservative". In 2020, the institute began hosting fellows.

=== Foreign policy ===
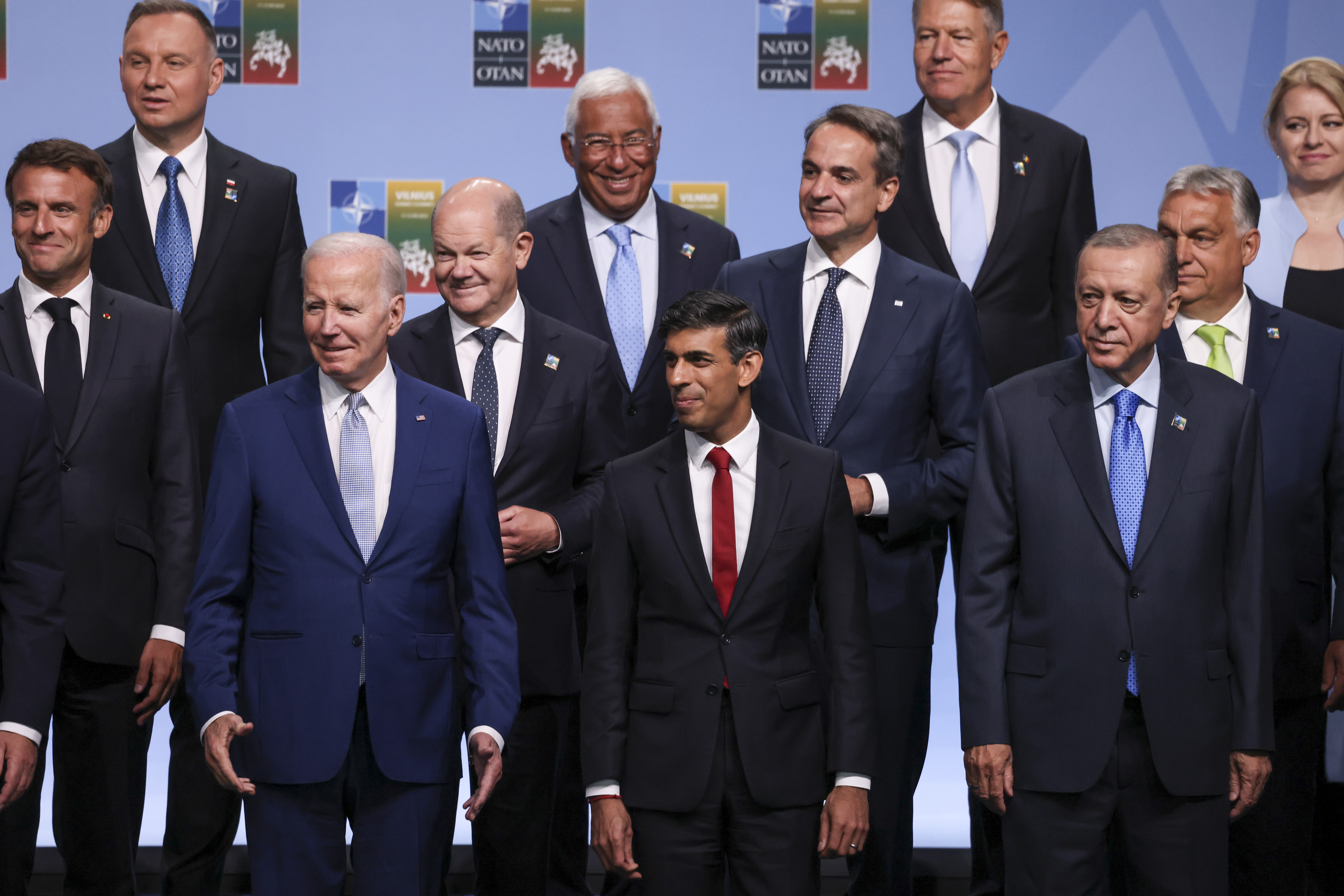
Orbán (second right) at the NATO summit in Vilnius on 11 July 2023

Orbán attended the inauguration ceremonies of re-elected Turkish President Recep Tayyip Erdoğan in Ankara in 2018 and 2023. In October 2018, Orbán said after talks with President Erdoğan in Budapest that "A stable Turkish government and a stable Turkey are a precondition for Hungary not to be endangered in any way due to overland migration."

In June 2019, Orbán met Myanmar's State Counsellor and Nobel Peace Prize winner Aung San Suu Kyi. They discussed bilateral ties and illegal migration.

==== China ====
Orbán has maintained close ties with China throughout his tenure, and his administration is generally seen as China's closest ally in the EU. Hungary joined China's Belt and Road Initiative (BRI) in 2015, while in April 2019, Orbán attended a BRI forum in Beijing, where he met the Chinese leader Xi Jinping. He spearheaded plans to open a Fudan University campus in Budapest, which led to pushback in Hungary. He met with Chinese Communist Party (CCP) Politburo member and top diplomat Wang Yi in Budapest on 20 February 2023; he afterwards backed the peace plan released by Wang Yi concerning Russia's invasion of Ukraine.

==== Russia and Ukraine ====
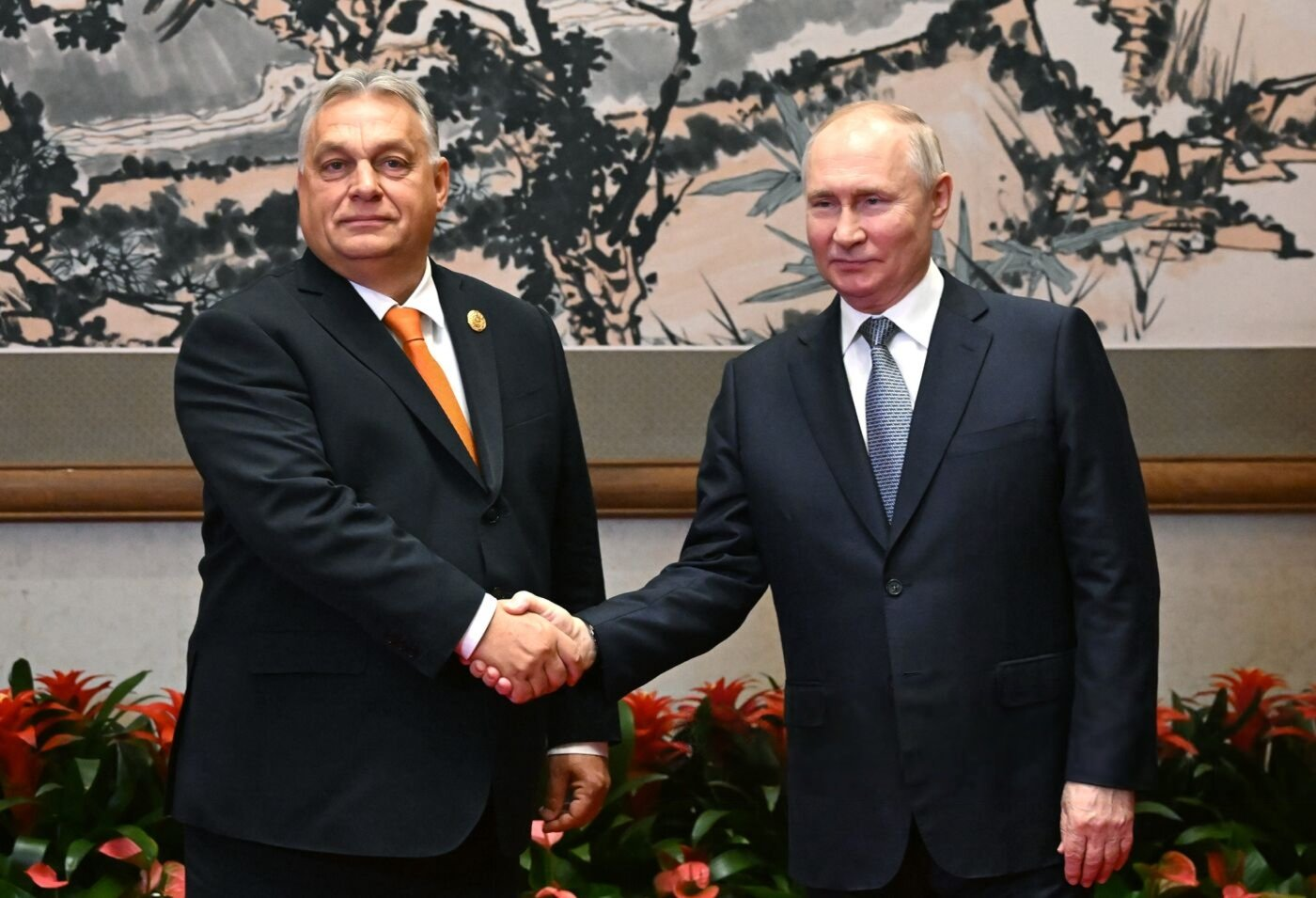
Orbán and Vladimir Putin in 2023

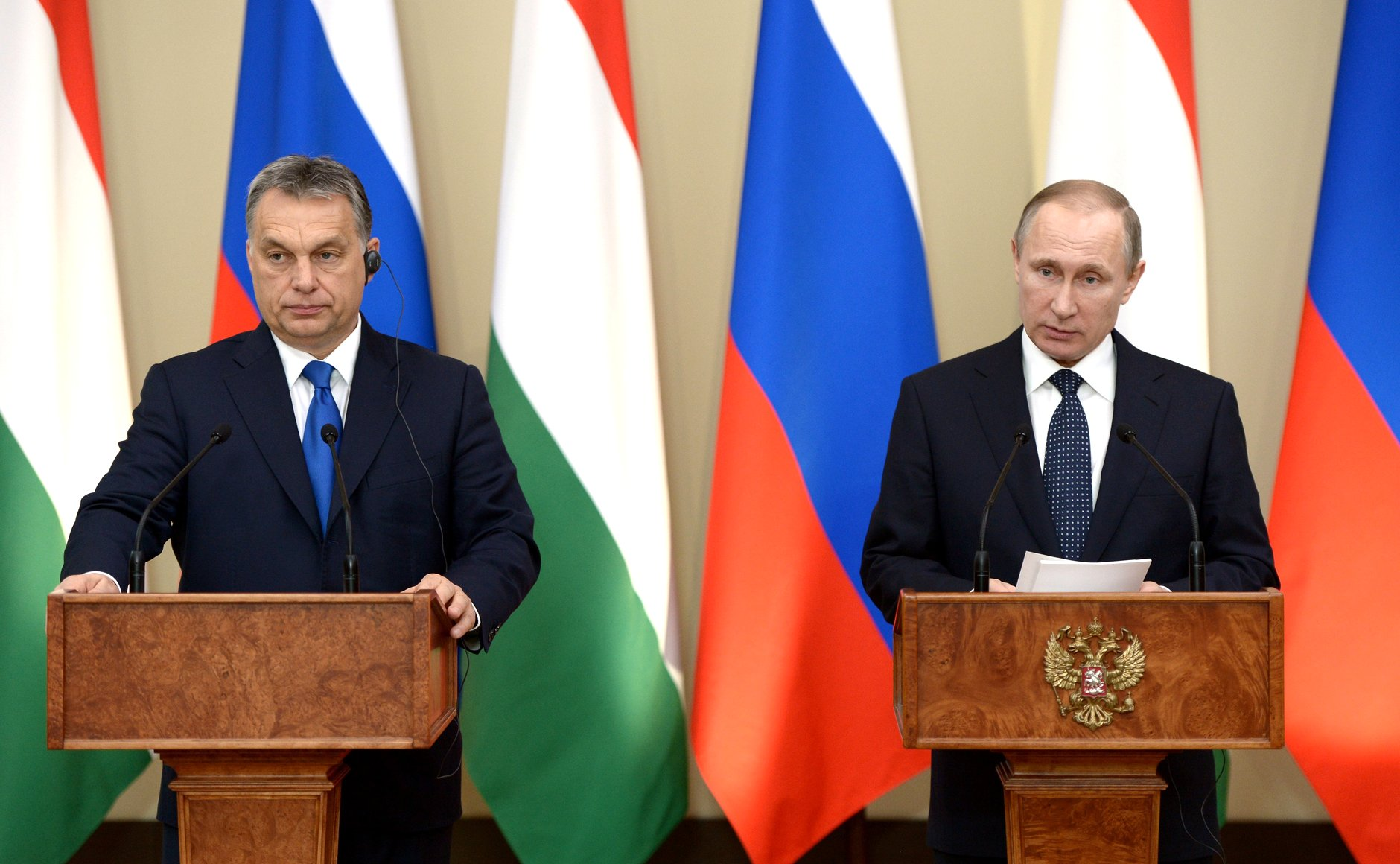
Orbán with Vladimir Putin in February 2016

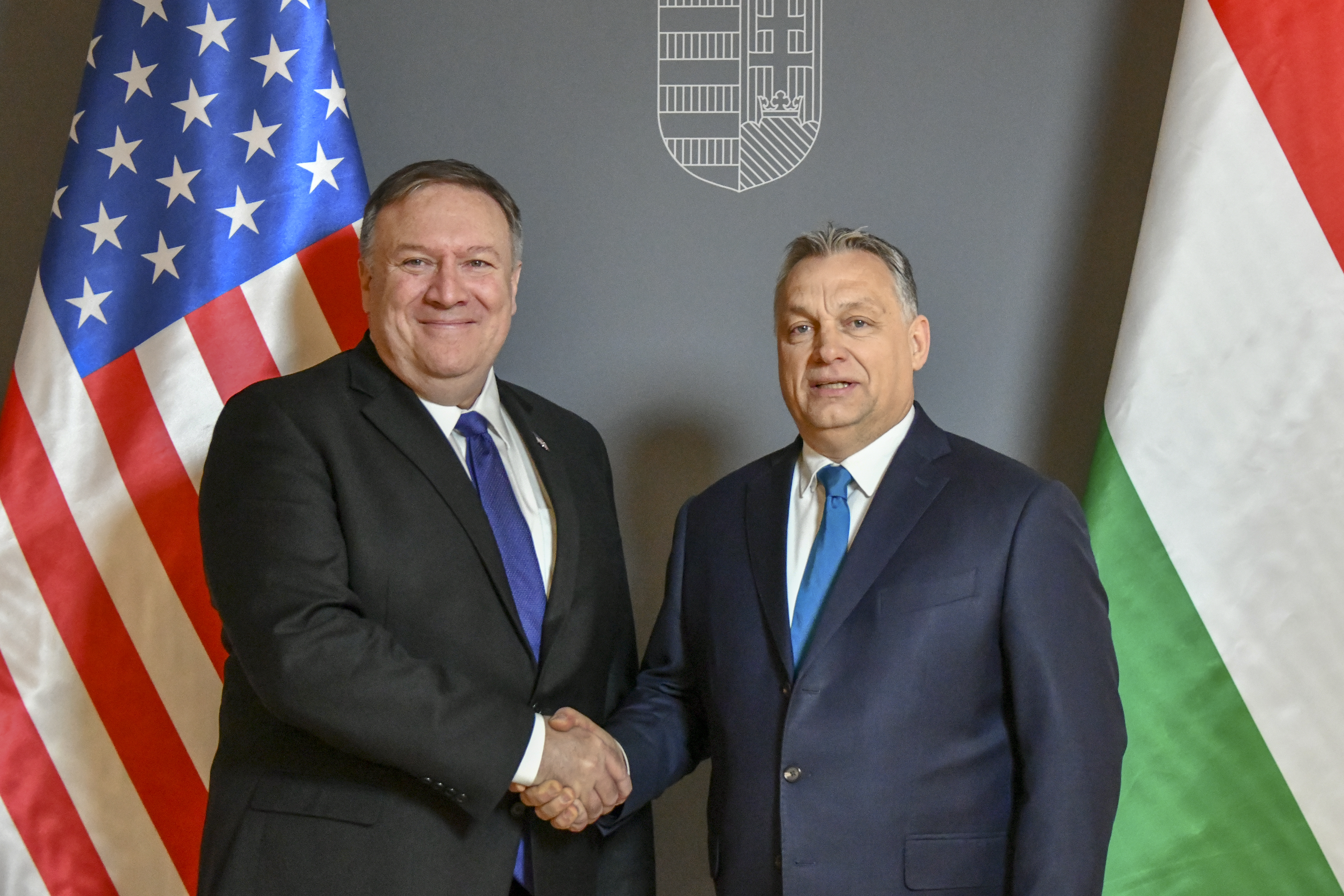
Orbán with Mike Pompeo in Budapest in February 2019

Orbán questioned Nord Stream 2, a new Russia–Germany natural gas pipeline. He said he wants to hear a "reasonable argument why South Stream was bad and Nord Stream is not". "South Stream" refers to the Balkan pipeline cancelled by Russia in December 2014 after obstacles from the EU.

Since 2017, Hungary's relations with Ukraine have rapidly deteriorated over the issue of the Hungarian minority in Ukraine. Orbán and his cabinet ministers repeatedly criticized Ukraine's 2017 education law, which makes Ukrainian the only language of education in state schools, and threatened to block further Ukraine's EU integration until it is modified or repealed. It is worth noting that the language law was amended in December 2023 in favor of the official languages of the European Union, including Hungarian.

Orbán has been considered one of the most pro-Russian heads of state worldwide, publicly praising Putin and his policies, even in the aftermath of the 2022 Russian invasion of Ukraine. On one hand, he has described the war as "clear aggression" by Russia, saying a sovereign Ukraine is needed "to stop Russia posing a threat to the security of Europe." However, conversely, he has also criticised the European Union for "prolonging the war" in Ukraine by sanctioning Russia and sending weapons and money to Ukraine instead of encouraging a negotiated peace, and has been accused of blocking aid to Ukraine. Consequently, Austro-Hungarian journalist Paul Lendvai called Orbán the Divider of Europe.

Amidst the 2021-2022 Ukraine crisis, Orbán was the first EU leader to meet with Vladimir Putin in Moscow in a visit he called "a peacekeeping mission". They also discussed Russian gas exports to Hungary. On 2 March, as Russia had already launched an invasion of Ukraine, Orbán decided to welcome Ukrainian refugees to Hungary, and will support the Ukrainian membership to the European Union. Initially, Orbán condemned Russia's invasion of Ukraine and said Hungary would not veto EU sanctions against Russia. However, Orbán rejected sanctions on Russian energy, due to Hungary's excessive dependency (85%) on Russian fossil fuels. In late March 2022, Ukrainian president Volodymyr Zelenskyy singled out Orbán for his lack of support for Ukraine. In June, Zelenskyy thanked Orbán for supporting Ukraine's sovereignty and for giving asylum to Ukrainians.

On 27 February 2023, Viktor Orbán said that Hungary supports China's peace plan in the Russo-Ukrainian war, despite opposition by Western leaders. Beijing's 12-point statement that criticised unilateral sanctions, would reduce strategic risks associated with nuclear weapons in Central and Eastern Europe, according to the statement.

On 16 October 2025, Orbán announced that Hungary had begun preparations for the 2025 Russia–United States summit in Hungary after having a phone call with Donald Trump that day. However, on 22 October, Trump announced that the meeting had been cancelled because negotiations had stalled.

==== Accession to the Organization of Turkic States ====
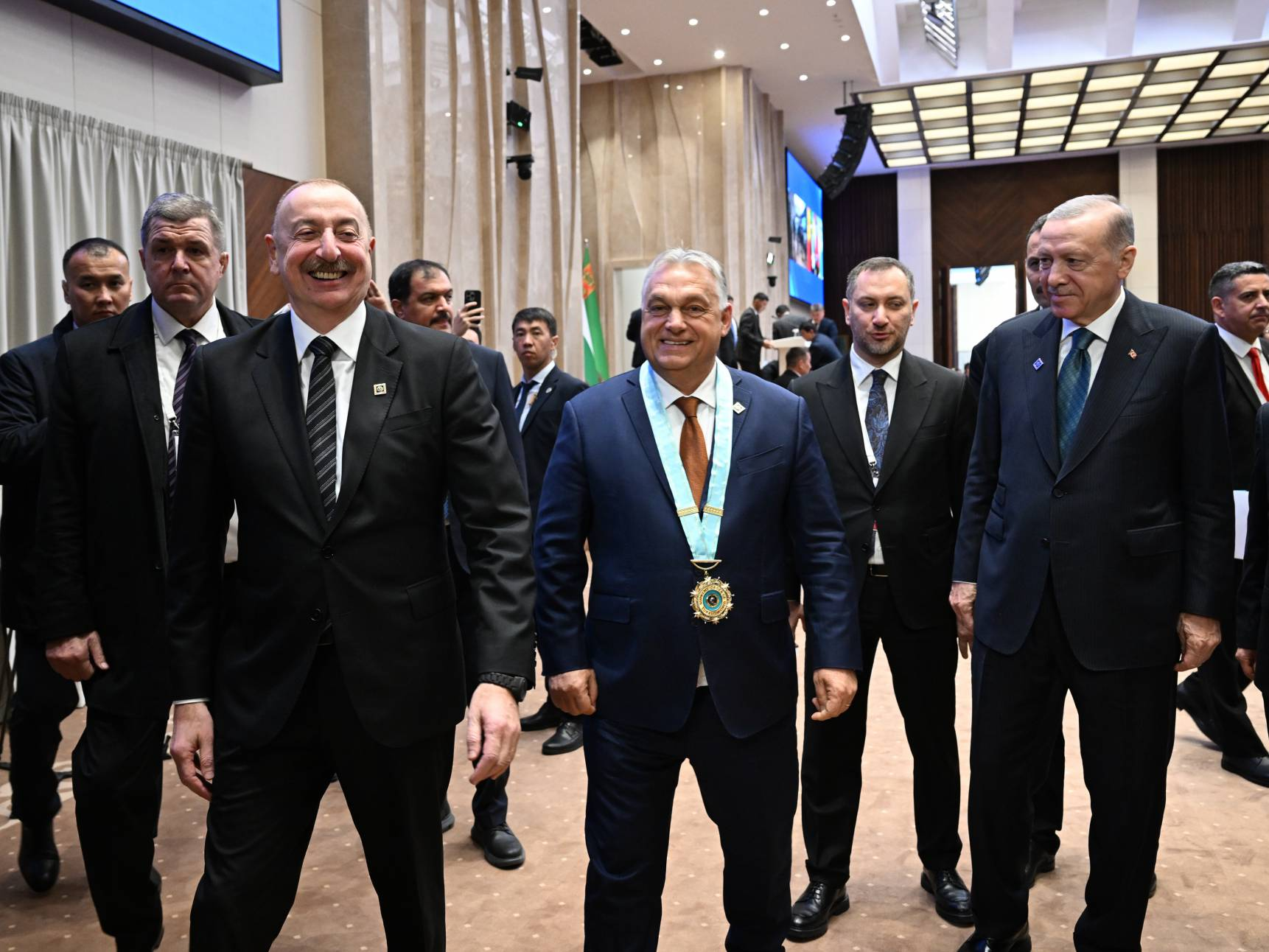
Orbán with Ilham Aliyev and Recep Tayyip Erdoğan during the 11th Summit of the Organization of Turkic States in Bishkek, Kyrgyzstan, in November 2024

Since 2014, Hungary has had observer status at the General Assembly of Turkic-speaking States, and in 2017 it submitted an application for accession to the International Turkic Academy. During the 6th Summit of Turkic Council, Orbán said that Hungary is seeking even closer cooperation with the Turkic Council. In 2018, Hungary obtained observer status in the council. In 2021, Orbán mentioned that the Hungarian and Turkic peoples share a historical and cultural heritage "reaching back many long centuries". He also pointed out that the Hungarian people are "proud of this heritage", and "were also proud when their opponents in Europe mocked them as barbarian Huns and Attila's people". In 2023, during his visit to Kazakhstan, Orbán said that Hungarians come to Kazakhstan "with great pleasure" because the two nations are connected by "millennial common roots".

==== Israel and Hamas ====
The Hungarian government expressed support for Israel in the Gaza war. On 13 October, Orbán stated "Israel has the right to defend itself" and "we will not allow sympathy rallies supporting terrorist organisations". On 22 October, Fidesz parliamentary leader Máté Kocsis announced that the party will introduce a manifesto before the parliament condemning Hamas terrorism.

In April 2025, Israeli Prime Minister Benjamin Netanyahu visited Budapest, despite the ICC's arrest warrant for Netanyahu for alleged war crimes and crimes against humanity in the Gaza Strip. During the visit, the Hungarian government of Orbán announced that Hungary would withdraw from the International Criminal Court (ICC), describing it as "politically biased".

==== United States ====
Orbán often attacked the administrations of presidents Barack Obama and Joe Biden, particularly for their supposed pro-immigration policies. Some analysts argue that Orban's attacks on the US are largely political theater for his domestic voters.

Orbán endorsed Trump in 2016, 2020 and 2024. Orbán is widely recognized as the only European leader to publicly endorse Donald Trump in every election.

In January 2022, Donald Trump endorsed Orbán in the 2022 Hungarian parliamentary election, saying in a statement that he "truly loves his Country and wants safety for his people", and praising his hard-line immigration policies. Donald Trump's former chief strategist, Steve Bannon, once called Orbán "Trump before Trump".

In August 2021, Tucker Carlson hosted some episodes of his show, Tucker Carlson Tonight, from Budapest, praising Orbán as the one elected leader "on the face of the earth, ... who publicly identifies as a Western-style conservative". He also conducted a fifteen-minute interview with Orbán, which was widely criticized for its fawning nature and lack of challenging questions.

In May 2022 the Conservative Political Action Conference, the "flagship conference" of American conservatism, held a satellite event in Budapest. In Florida, a law regulating sex education in schools, sometimes called the "Don't Say Gay" law, resembles a similar Hungarian law passed in 2021 and was, according to governor Ron DeSantis's press secretary, inspired by it.

In August 2022, Orbán was the opening speaker at the Conservative Political Action Conference (CPAC) in Dallas, Texas.

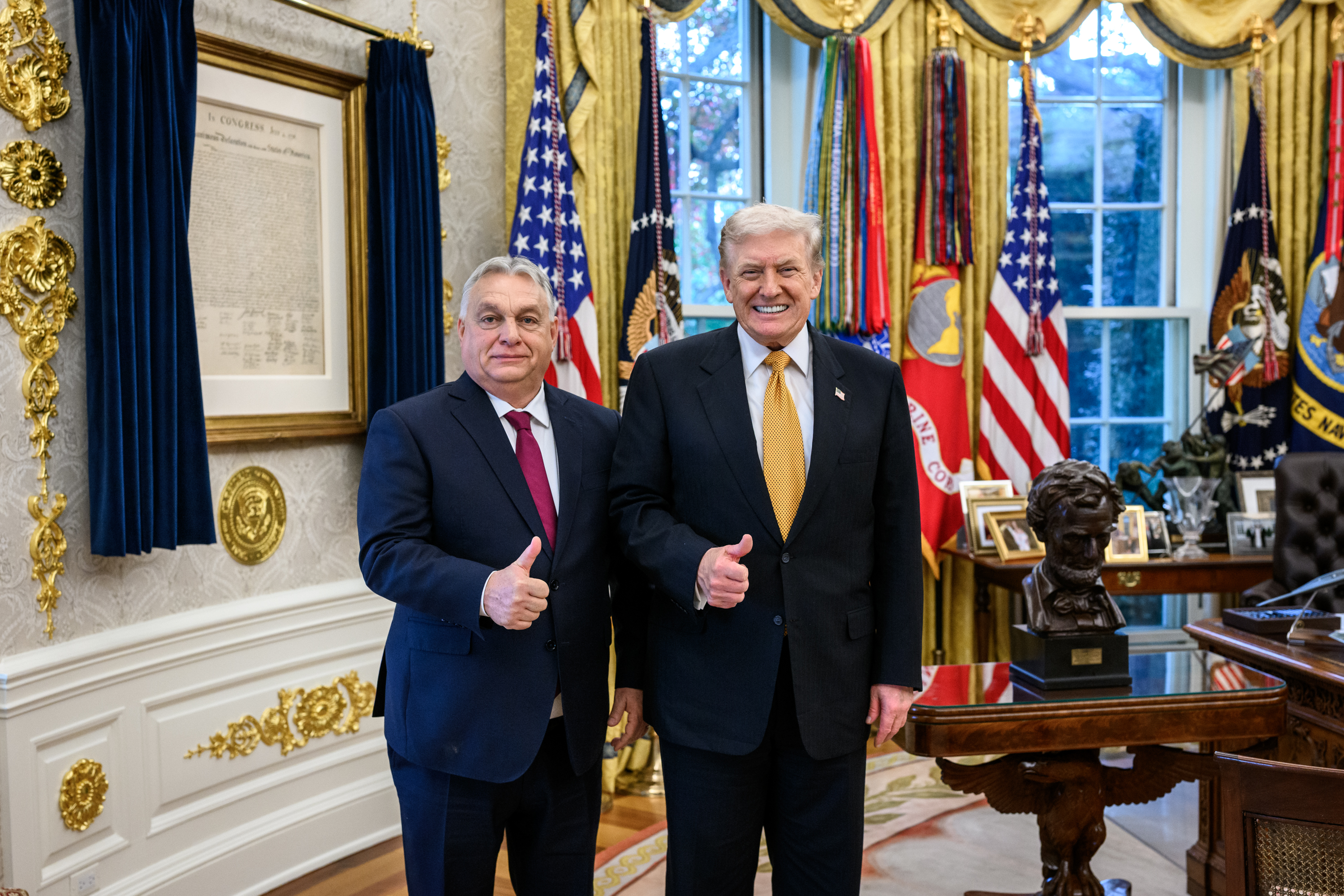
Orbán with Donald Trump in the Oval Office, November 2025

=== Domestic policy ===
Viktor Orbán's domestic policy agenda has placed emphasis on cultural conservatism, especially through pro-natalist policies designed to encourage family formation and reduce immigration. Female university graduates who have (or adopt) children within two years of graduation receive partial or full forgiveness on their student loans, including a full write-off of their student debt if they have three or more children. Hungarian women who have four or more children are eligible for full income tax exemption for life. Married couples are eligible for low fixed-rate mortgages on a house with additional financial support through family housing benefits, as well as subsidies for the purchase of seven-seat cars for families with three or more children and financial support for child care. In support of these policies, Orbán stated in 2019 that "For the west, the answer is immigration. For every missing child there should be one coming in and then the numbers will be fine. But we do not need numbers. We need Hungarian children." The government has also tightened legal regulations on access to abortion, including requiring pregnant women to listen to the heartbeat of the fetus prior to an abortion being approved by a doctor. The number of abortions procured in Hungary between 2010 and 2023 fell almost 45%, from 44.8 per hundred live births in 2010 to 24.8 per hundred in 2023.

As stated by The Guardian, the "Hungarian government doubled family spending between 2010 and 2019", intending to achieve "a lasting turn in demographic processes by 2030". Orbán has espoused an anti-immigration platform, and has also advocated for increased investment into "Family First". Orbán has disregarded the European Union's attempts to promote integration as a key solution to population distribution problems in Europe. He has also supported investments into countering the country's low birth rates. Orbán has tapped into the "great replacement theory" which emulates a nativist approach to rejecting foreign immigration out of fear of replacement by immigrants. He has stated that "If Europe is not going to be populated by Europeans in the future and we take this as given, then we are speaking about an exchange of populations, to replace the population of Europeans with others." The Guardian stated that "This year the Hungarian government introduced a 10 million forint (£27,000) interest-free loan for families, which does not have to be paid back if the couple has three children."

His government's economic approach has been referred to as "Orbánomics". Despite early concerns that these reforms would undermine investor confidence, economic growth has been strong with unemployment "plummeting" between 2010 and 2021 and year-on-year GDP growth at 4 percent in 2021. Progressive taxation on income was abolished in 2015 and replaced with a flat rate of 16% on gross income, and income taxes on those aged 25 years or younger was abolished entirely in 2021. Hungary paid the last of its IMF loan ahead of schedule in 2013, with the fund closing its Budapest office later that year. In December 2018, Orbán helped push through a controversial change to the Hungarian labor code that raised the annual cap on overtime from 250 to 400 hours, while giving employers up to three years to pay for the extra work hours. Due to the economic impact of Russia's invasion of Ukraine, as well as the shocks of COVID-19 pandemic and lockdowns, Orbán's government has imposed windfall taxes on banks, pharmaceutical companies, and energy companies in order to maintain a government-subsidized cap on utility bills (including gas, electricity, water, district heating, sewage, and garbage collection) which continues into 2023.

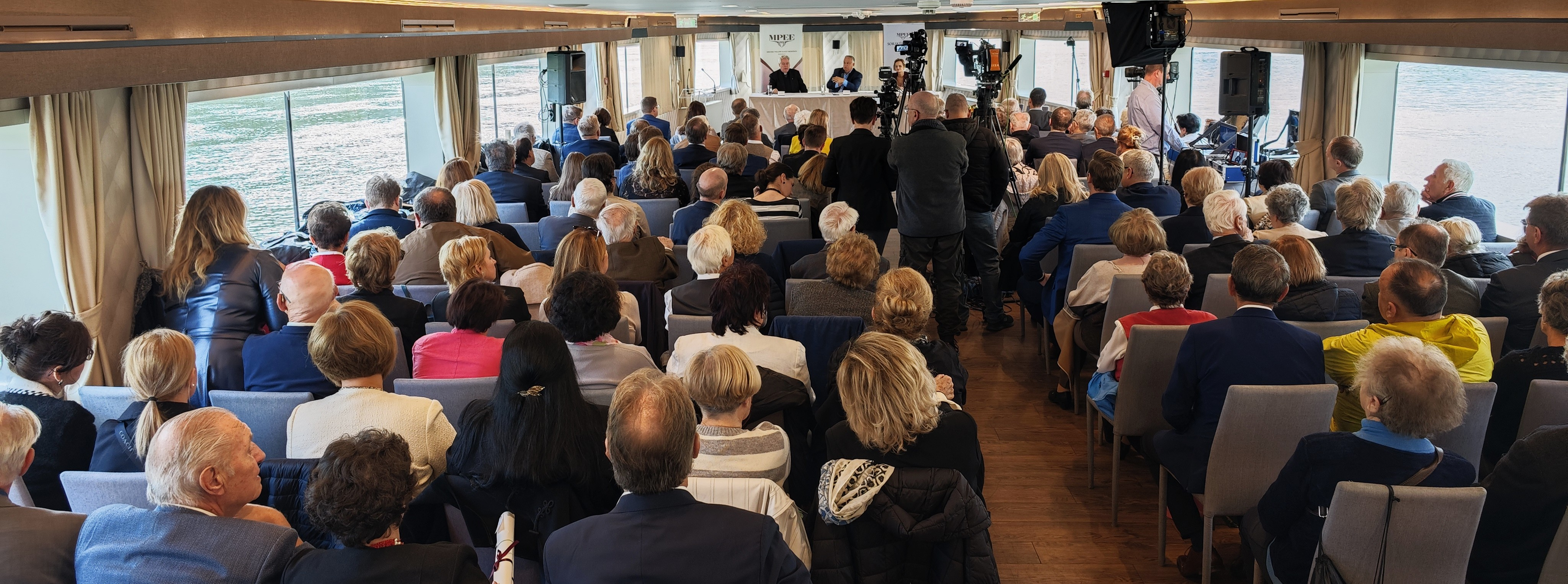
Viktor Orbán on Civic Gondola 2025

Orbán's government has encouraged and provided financial support for the establishment of conservative think-tanks and cultural institutions. The Mathias Corvinus Collegium has purchased stakes in several European universities and has purchased the Modul University in Vienna. The think tank's Brussels branch opened in November 2022. In 2021, Orbán's government passed a bill which privatized 11 Hungarian universities and subsequently were endowed billions of euros in assets from the state budget, as well as real estate and shares in large companies. The government has appointed conservatives to the supervisory boards of these universities.

As part of a drive to "re-Christianize" the country, his government has privatised many previously state-run schools and enlisted Christian churches to provide education, introduced religion classes into the national education curriculum, and provided financial support to more Christian schools. The country's kindergarten curriculum was amended to promote "national identity, Christian cultural values, patriotism, attachment to homeland and family". Between 2010 and 2018, the number of Catholic schools increased from 9.4 percent to 18 percent. The government also created the Center for Fundamental Rights (Hungarian: Alapjogokért Központ) in 2013 who describe their mission as "preserving national identity, sovereignty and Christian social traditions". In 2019 the government passed a law taking control of the Hungarian Academy of Sciences.

=== Democratic backsliding, corruption and authoritarianism ===
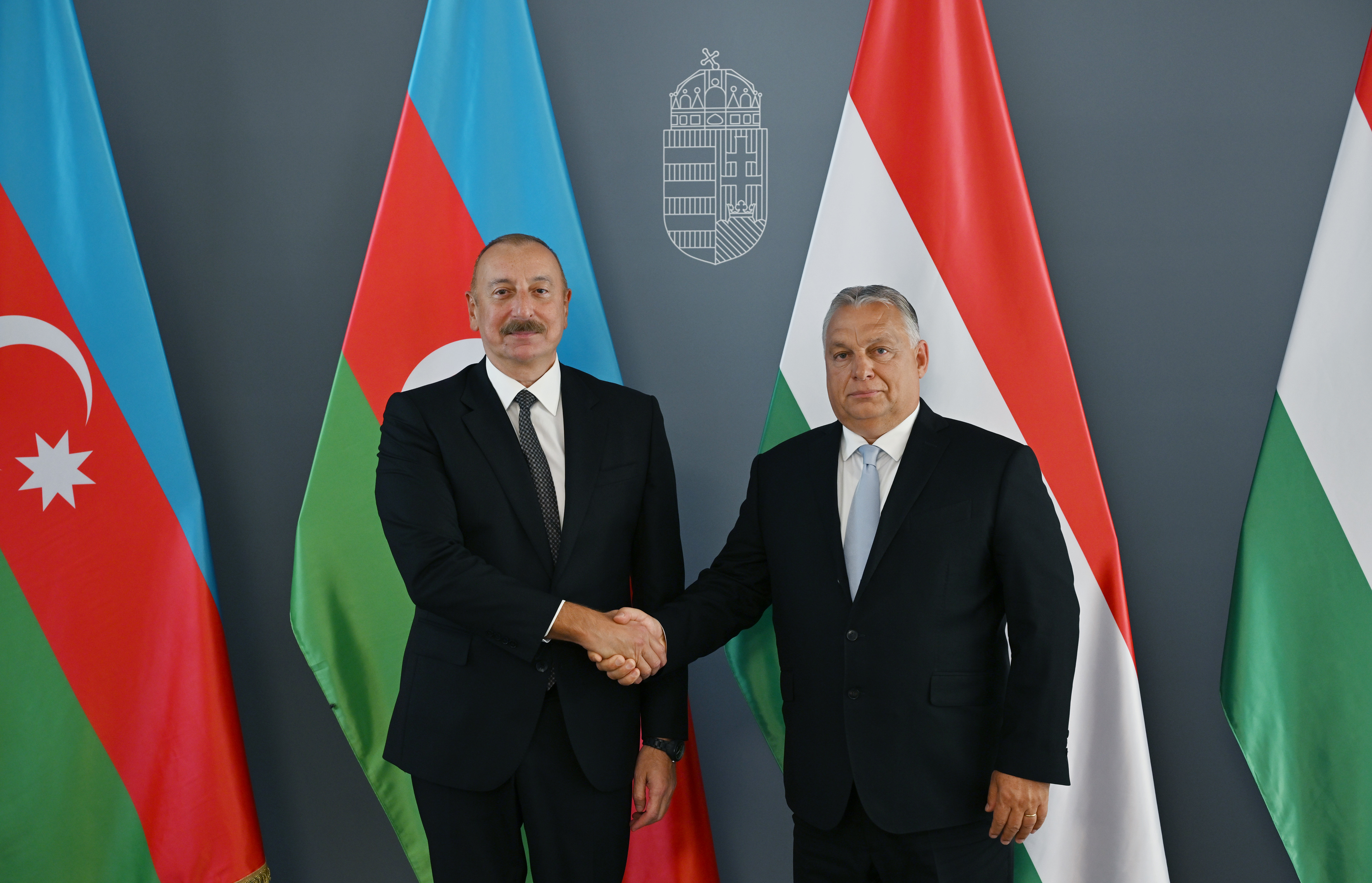
Orbán with Azerbaijani President Ilham Aliyev in Budapest on 20 August 2023

According to Transparency International, Hungary was the most corrupt country in the European Union in 2023. Between 2010 and 2020, Hungary dropped 69 places in the Press Freedom Index, lost 11 places in the Democracy Index, and deteriorated 16 places in the Corruption Perceptions Index. In 2019 Freedom House downgraded the country from "free" to "partly free". The V-Dem Democracy indices rank Hungary in 2021 as 96th in its "electoral democracy index" that measures "whether elections were free and fair, as well as the prevalence of a free and independent media", sitting between Benin and Malaysia. Additionally, Freedom House's Nations in Transit 2020 report reclassified Hungary from a democracy to a transitional or hybrid regime. Furthermore, in 2022, the European Parliament stated that "Hungary can no longer be considered a full democracy" and that the country has become an "electoral autocracy".

János Kornai, a scholar of Eastern European economics, described the evolution of the Hungarian state during Orbán's second premiership as having taken a "u-turn" away from the aim of becoming a market economy based on the rule of law and private ownership and instead beginning the "systematic destruction of the fundamental institutions of democracy". In her 2015 article on Orbán's illiberal democracy, Abby Innes, associate professor of political economy at the London School of Economics simply states that "Hungary can no longer be ranked a democratic country". Former minister of education, Bálint Magyar, stated that elections in Hungary under Orbán were undemocratic and "free but not fair", due to gerrymandering, large-scale control over the media, and suspect funding for political campaigns.

In the April 2022 election, Orbán's Fidesz party won 54% of the vote but 83% of the districts, due to gerrymandering, and "other tweaks" to Hungarian electoral rules. According to American journalist and author Andrew Marantz, Orbán passed laws, amended the constitution and "patiently debilitated, delegitimatized, hollowed out" civic institutions such as courts, universities, and the apparatus necessary for free elections that are now controlled by Orbán loyalists. Domination of the public media by Orbán prevents the public from hearing critics' point of view. In 2022, Orbán's opponent was given just five minutes on the national television "to make his case to the voters". Private media outlets like the ATV and RTL, among others, offered playtime for opposition members. An example of the discreet, below-the-radar process of accumulating power by Orbán and his party was the creation of a special police force that started as a small anti-terror unit. The unit grew and became more powerful "bit by bit in disparate clauses buried in unrelated laws". Marantz cites Princeton professor of sociology Kim Lane Scheppele, who contends the unit now has enough power to function "essentially" as Orbán's "secret police".

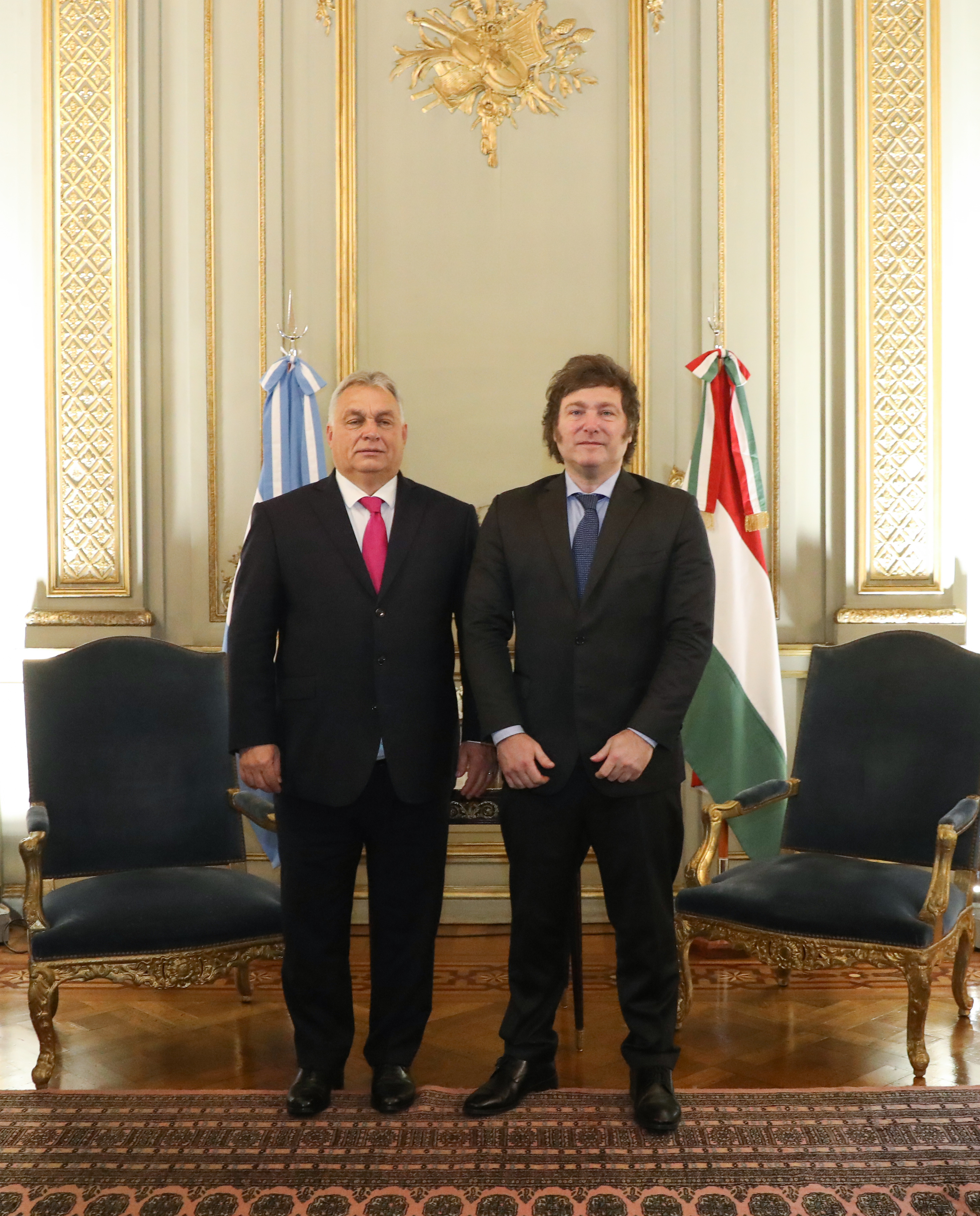
Orbán with Argentine President Javier Milei on 9 December 2023

Hungarian political scientist András Körösényi, using Max Weber's classification, argues that Orbán's rule cannot be described simply by the notions of authoritarianisation or illiberalism. He stresses out that the Orbán regime can be characterised as plebiscitary leadership democracy instead. In addition, extensive research has been conducted to describe the idea of a "national, sovereign, bourgeois Hungary" stated as the goal of Orbán's rule, is in fact a "political product" of a post-communist mafia state serving to obscure massive corruption and transfers of wealth to those with the right connections.

Orbán's critics have included foreign leaders such as former United States Secretary of State Hillary Clinton, German Chancellor Angela Merkel, and the Presidents of the European Commission José Manuel Barroso, and Jean-Claude Juncker, along with intergovernmental organizations, and non-governmental organizations. He has been accused of pursuing anti-democratic reforms; reducing the independence of Hungary's press, judiciary and central bank; amending Hungary's constitution to prevent amendments to Fidesz-backed legislation; and of cronyism and nepotism.

=== Anti-LGBT policies ===
Since his election as prime minister in 2010, Orbán has led initiatives and laws to limit LGBT+ rights. In 2020, Orbán's government ended legal recognition of transgender people, receiving criticism both in Hungary and abroad.

In 2021, his party proposed new legislation to censor any "LGBT+ positive content" in movies, books or public advertisements and to severely restrict sex education in school forbidding any information thought to "encourage gender change or homosexuality". The law has been likened to Russia's restriction on "homosexual propaganda". German Chancellor Angela Merkel and European Commission President Ursula von der Leyen harshly criticized the law, while a letter from sixteen EU leaders including Pedro Sánchez and Mario Draghi warned against "threats against fundamental rights and in particular the principle of non-discrimination on grounds of sexual orientation".

His anti-LGBT+ positions came under more scrutiny after the revelation that one of the European deputies of his party, József Szájer, had participated in a gay sex party in Brussels, despite the ongoing COVID-19 pandemic quarantine restrictions. Szájer was one of the major architects behind the 2011 Constitution of Hungary. This new constitution has been criticized by Human Rights Watch for being discriminatory towards the LGBT+ community.

To coincide with the parliamentary election in the spring of 2022, Orbán announced a four-question referendum regarding LGBTQ issues in education. It did not pass. It came after complaints from the European Union (EU) about anti-LGBTQ discriminatory laws. Human rights groups condemned the referendum as anti-LGBT rhetoric that supported discrimination.

On 22 July 2023, in a speech he gave in Romania, Orbán complained that the EU was conducting an "LGBTQ offensive".

On 18 March 2025, the Parliament voted in favor of a ban on Pride parades.

=== Green transition and climate change ===
When US president Donald Trump decided to withdraw from the Paris Agreement on climate change in 2017, Orbán stated: "In Hungary, there is a consensus that climate change is real, that it is dangerous and since it is a global phenomenon, it requires global action to combat it."

In October 2021, Orbán warned that the European Commission's planned Fit for 55 climate package and the resulting high energy prices would "destroy" Europe's middle classes, saying that "those responsible for sky-high electricity and gas prices are endangering European democracy." He called the European Union's climate protection plans a "utopian fantasy".

In June 2024, Orbán expressed support for the green transition, but criticized the way it was implemented by the "current Brussels elite".

==== Economic cronyism ====
In the book The Ark of Orbán, Attila Antal wrote that the Orbán system of governance is characterized by the transformation of public money into private money, a system that has built a neo-feudal world of national capitalists, centered on the prime minister and his own family business interests. The largest share of national capitalists is the oligarchy "produced" by the system, such as István Tiborcz, his son-in-law and Lőrinc Mészáros, his childhood friend and his family.

A 2016 opinion piece for The New York Times by Kenneth Krushel called Orbán's political system a kleptocracy that wipes some of the country's wealth partly into its own pockets and partly into the pockets of people close to it.

A 2017 Financial Times article compared the Hungarian elite under Orbán's government to Russian oligarchs. The article noted that they differ in that Hungary's "Oligarchs" under Orbán largely benefit from EU subsidies, unlike the Russian oligarchs. The article also mentioned the sudden increase in the personal wealth of Orbán's childhood friend, Lőrinc Mészáros, thanks to winning state contracts.

A 2019 New York Times investigation revealed how Orbán leased plots of farm land to politically connected individuals and supporters of his and his party, thereby channeling disproportionate amounts of the EU's agricultural subsidies Hungary receives every year into the pockets of cronies.

Orbán was accused of pork barrel politics for building Pancho Aréna, a 4,000-seat stadium in the village in which he grew up, Felcsút, at a distance of some 6 metres (20 ft) from his country house. The stadium, alongside an adjoining soccer academy, cost more than an estimated $200 million to build.

==== Opposition to European integration ====
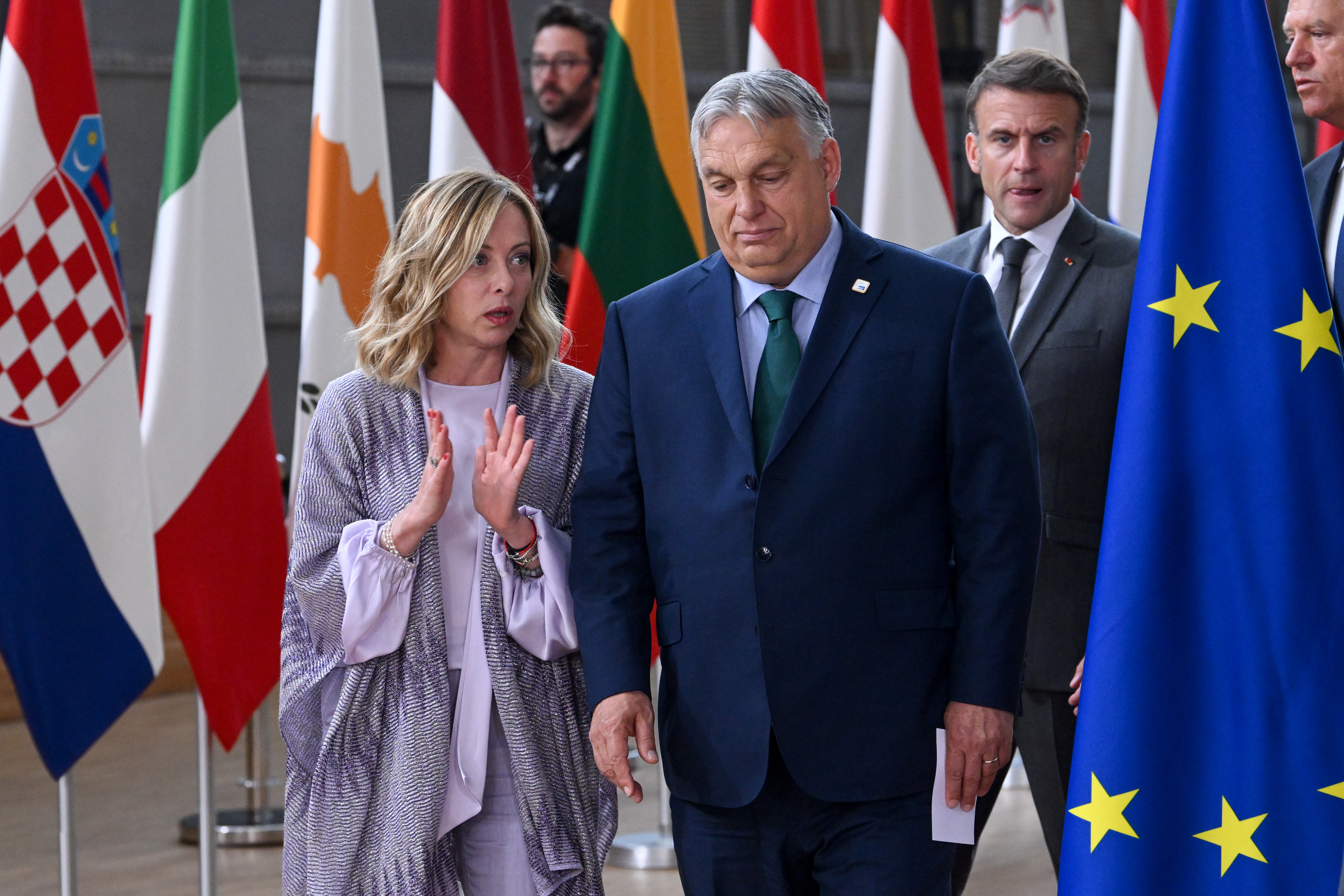
Orbán with Italian Prime Minister Giorgia Meloni in June 2024

Some opposition parties and critics also consider Orbán an opponent of European integration. In 2000, opposition parties MSZP and SZDSZ and the left-wing press presented Orbán's comment that "there's life outside the EU" as proof of his anti-Europeanism and sympathies with the radical right. In the same press conference, Orbán clarified that "It will not be a tragedy if we cannot join the EU in 2003. (...) But this is not what we are preparing for. We are trying to urge our integration [into the EU], because it may give a new push to the economy."

Despite the anti-EU rhetoric from Orbán, Hungary under Orbán supported enlargement of the European Union with Serbia, Albania, Moldova, Montenegro, North Macedonia, Bosnia and Herzegovina, Georgia and Turkey.

==== Migrant crisis ====
Hungarian-American business magnate and political activist George Soros criticized Orbán's handling of the European migrant crisis in 2015, saying: "His plan treats the protection of national borders as the objective and the refugees as an obstacle. Our plan treats the protection of refugees as the objective and national borders as the obstacle."

Orbán has been critical of German Chancellor Angela Merkel's decision to open Germany's borders to migrants in 2015. but he himself has been criticized for engineering the 2015 European migrant crisis for his own political gain. Specifically, he has been accused of mistreating migrants within Hungary and later sending many to Western Europe in an effort to stoke far-right sympathies in Western European countries. During the crisis, Orbán ordered fences be put up across the Hungarian borders with Serbia and Croatia and refused to comply with the European Union's mandatory asylum quota.

In 2015, The New York Times acknowledged that Orbán's stance on migration is slowly becoming mainstream in European politics. Andrew Higgins interviewed Orbán's ardent critic, György Konrád, who said that Orbán was right and Merkel was wrong concerning the handling of the migrant crisis.

===== Anti-Soros theme =====
The Orbán government began to attack George Soros and his NGOs in early 2017, particularly for his support for more open immigration. In July 2017, the Israeli ambassador in Hungary joined Jewish groups and others in denouncing a billboard campaign backed by the government. Orbán's critics claimed it "evokes memories of the Nazi posters during the Second World War". The ambassador stated that the campaign "evokes sad memories but also sows hatred and fear", an apparent reference to the Holocaust. Hours later, Israel's Ministry of Foreign Affairs issued a "clarification", denouncing Soros, stating that he "continuously undermines Israel's democratically elected governments" and funded organizations "that defame the Jewish state and seek to deny it the right to defend itself". The clarification came a few days before an official visit to Hungary by Israeli Prime Minister Benjamin Netanyahu. The anti-Soros messages became key elements of the government's communication and campaign since then, which, among others, also targeted the Central European University (CEU).

Journalist Andrew Marantz argues that whether or not Soros was doing any actual harm to Hungary or conservative values, it was important to have a face to attack in a political campaign rather than abstract ideas like "globalism, multiculturalism, bureaucracy in Brussels"; and that this was a strategy explained to Orbán by political consultant Arthur J. Finkelstein.

==== Accusations of antisemitism ====
Orbán has been frequently accused of antisemitism, particularly for promoting conspiracy theories about the Jewish philanthropist George Soros. In 2022 he was condemned by the International Auschwitz Committee for comments in which he criticised mixing "with non-Europeans". The Committee called on the EU to continue to distance itself from "Orbán's racist undertones and to make it clear to the world that a Mr. Orbán has no future in Europe". Others have rejected the claim that he is antisemitic, arguing that his founding of the Holocaust Memorial Center and Memorial Day for the Hungarian Victims of the Holocaust are evidence of this. He has also been accused of rehabilitating antisemitic Hungarian historical figures and of exploiting antisemitism.

==== Irredentism and nativism ====
Orbán's policy positions have been reported to lean towards irredentism and nativism. He has overseen the transfer of hundreds of millions of Hungarian taxpayer money for the preservation of Hungarian language and monuments and institutions of the Hungarian diaspora, particularly in Romania, irking the Romanian government.

==== Mixed-race statement ====
In a speech delivered to the 31st Bálványos Free Summer University and Student Camp in July 2022, Orbán expressed views that were later described as "a pure Nazi text" that was "worthy of Goebbels" by one of his senior advisers, Zsuzsa Hegedűs, in her letter of resignation. In the speech, Orbán stated that "Migration has split Europe in two – or I could say that it has split the West in two. One half is a world where European and non-European peoples live together. These countries are no longer nations: they are nothing more than a conglomeration of peoples" and "we are willing to mix with one another, but we do not want to become peoples of mixed-race". The speech drew condemnation from both the Romanian foreign ministry and other European leaders. Two days later, in Vienna, Orbán made it clear, he was talking about cultures and not about race. In a letter to Orbán, Zsuzsa Hegedüs later expressed that she was proud of him, and that he could count on her like he could in the past 20 years.

Later that month, he touched on this criticism in a speech at the CPAC opening in Dallas, saying that "a Christian politician cannot be racist" and calling his critics "simply idiots". He also attacked billionaire George Soros, former United States President Barack Obama, "globalists", and the United States' Democratic Party.

== Personal life ==
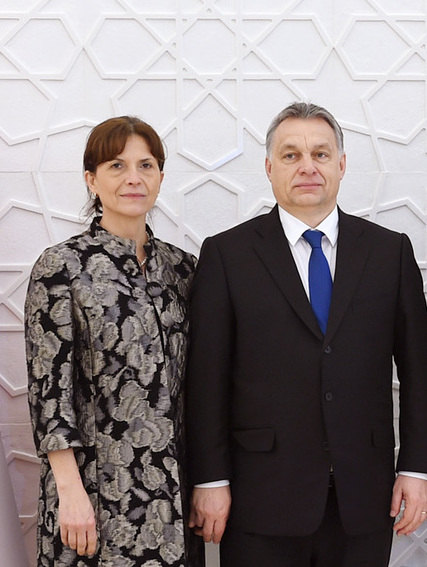
Orbán and his wife, Anikó Lévai, in 2016

Orbán married jurist Anikó Lévai in 1986; they have five children. Their eldest daughter, Ráhel, is married to entrepreneur István Tiborcz, whose company, Elios, was accused of receiving unfair advantages when winning public tenders. (see Elios case) Orbán's son, Gáspár, is a retired footballer, who played for Ferenc Puskás Football Academy in 2014. Gáspár is also one of the founders of a religious community called Felház.

Orbán is a member of the Calvinist-oriented Hungarian Reformed Church, while his wife and their five children were raised Catholic. His son Gáspár Orbán converted in 2014 to the Faith Church, a Pentecostal denomination, and is currently a minister. He has claimed to have heard from God and to have witnessed miraculous healings.

Hatvanpuszta, a historic estate once part of Archduke Joseph's Alcsút estate, was purchased in 2011 by a company owned by Viktor Orbán's father, Győző Orbán. The estate has since undergone extensive redevelopment, sparking controversy and allegations of secrecy, with critics suggesting it serves as a private retreat for the Hungarian Prime Minister.

=== Football interests ===
Orbán has played football from his early childhood. He was a professional player with Felcsút FC. After ending his football career, he became one of the main financiers of the club, and of Hungarian football in general; the club was later renamed to Puskás Akadémia FC, which he had a prominent role in the foundation of.

He played an important role in establishing the annually organised international youth cup, the Puskás Cup, at Pancho Aréna, which he also helped build, in his hometown of Felcsút. His only son, Gáspár, learned and trained there.

Orbán is said to watch as many as six games a day. His first trip abroad as prime minister in 1998 was to the World Cup final in Paris; according to inside sources, he has not missed a World Cup or Champions League final since.

Then FIFA President Sepp Blatter visited the facilities at the Puskás Academy in 2009. Blatter, together with the widow of Ferenc Puskás, as well as Orbán, founder of the academy, announced the creation of the new FIFA Puskás Award during that visit. He played the minor role of a footballer in the Hungarian family film Szegény Dzsoni és Árnika (1983).

== Awards and honors ==
=== Foreign ===
- Bosnia and Herzegovina (Republika Srpska):
  - Order of the Republika Srpska (2024)
- France:
  - Grand Cross of the National Order of Merit (2001)
- Kazakhstan:
  - First Class of the Order of Friendship (2023)
- Lithuania:
  - Commander's Grand Cross of the Order of the Lithuanian Grand Duke Gediminas (2009)
- North Macedonia:
  - Order 8-September (2013)
- Serbia:
  - First Class of the Order of the Republic of Serbia (2022)
- Vatican:
  - Knight Grand Cross of the Order of St. Gregory the Great (2004)

=== Confessional ===
- Holy Cross Medal of Gratitude (Armenian Catholic Church, 2022)
- First Class of the Order of Glory and Honor (Russian Orthodox Church, 2023)
- First Class of the Order of St. Sava (Serbian Orthodox Church, 2022)

=== Other honors ===
- Honorary senator of the European Academy of Sciences and Arts (2000)
- Freedom Award by the American Enterprise Institute (2001)
- Franz Josef Strauss Prize from the Hanns Seidel Foundation (2001)
- Polak Award established by the Maria Polak Foundation (2001)
- Prize for the Social Market Economy by the German Club of Economics (2002)
- Honorary Citizen of Szék, Hungary (2002)
- Saint Stephen Award (2002)
- László Tőkés Award by the László Tőkés Foundation (2003)
- Honorary Citizen of Esztergom, Hungary, twice (2006, 2009)
- Gold Medal of the Foundation of European Merit (2004)
- World No Tobacco Day Award by the World Health Organization (2013)
- Title 'Man of the Year 2013' by Polish magazine Gazeta Polska (2014)
- 'The 28 People From 28 Countries Who Are Shaping, Shaking And Stirring Europe: Class Of 2016' by magazine Politico Europe
- Title 'Man of the Year 2015'at the Economic Forum in Poland (2016)
- FINA Order of Merit (2017)
- Golden Order of the Azeri international magazine My Azerbaijan (2022)
- Supreme Order of Turkic World (6 November 2024)

=== Honorary doctorates ===
- Tufts University (United States, 2002)
- Josai University (Japan, 2013)
- Marmara University (Turkey, 2013)

== See also ==
- First Orbán Government
- Second Orbán Government
- Third Orbán Government
- Fourth Orbán Government
- Fifth Orbán Government
- Orbanomics
- List of prime ministers of Hungary by tenure
- List of current heads of state and government
- List of heads of the executive by approval rating

== Bibliography ==
- Bell, Imogen (2003). Central and South-Eastern Europe 2004. Routledge. ISBN 978-1857431865.
- Debreczeni, József (2002), Orbán Viktor (in Hungarian), Budapest: Osiris
- Fabry, Adam (2019). "Neoliberalism, crisis and authoritarian – ethnicist reaction: The ascendancy of the Orbán regime". Competition & Change. 23 (2): 165–191. doi:10.1177/1024529418813834. S2CID 158640642.
- Kenney, Padraic (2002). A Carnival of Revolution: Central Europe 1989. Princeton: Princeton University Press. ISBN 0-691-05028-7.
- Lendvai, Paul (2017). Orbán: Hungary's Strongman. Oxford University Press. ISBN 978-0190874865.
- Martens, Wilfried (2009). Europe: I Struggle, I Overcome. Springer. ISBN 978-3540892885.
- Metz, Rudolf, and Daniel Oross. "Strong Personalities’ Impact on Hungarian Party Politics: Viktor Orbán and Gábor Vona." in Party Leaders in Eastern Europe (Palgrave Macmillan, Cham, 2020) pp. 145–170. doi:10.1007/978-3-030-32025-6_7
- Rydliński, Bartosz. "Viktor Orbán–First among Illiberals? Hungarian and Polish Steps towards Populist Democracy." Online Journal Modelling the New Europe 26 (2018): 95–107. online
- Szikra D. "Democracy and welfare in hard times: the social policy of the Orban Government in Hungary between 2010 and 2014" Journal of European Social Policy (2014) 24(5): 486–500.
- Szilágyi, Anna, and András Bozóki. "Playing it again in post-communism: the revolutionary rhetoric of Viktor Orbán in Hungary." Advances in the History of Rhetoric 18.sup1 (2015): S153–S166. online
- Toomey, Michael (2018). "History, nationalism and democracy: myth and narrative in Viktor Orbán's 'illiberal Hungary'". New Perspectives. Interdisciplinary Journal of Central & East European Politics and International Relations. 26 (1): 87–108. doi:10.1177/2336825X1802600110.

Political offices
| Preceded by Gyula Horn | Prime Minister of Hungary; 1998–2002 | Succeeded by Péter Medgyessy |
| Preceded by Gordon Bajnai | Prime Minister of Hungary; 2010–2026 | Succeeded by Péter Magyar |
Party political offices
| New title | President of Fidesz; 1993–2000 | Succeeded by László Kövér |
| Preceded by János Áder | President of Fidesz; 2003–present | Incumbent |
