= Szelényi =

Szelényi is a surname. Notable people with the surname include:

- Iván Szelényi (1938–2026), Hungarian-American sociologist
- Zsuzsanna Szelényi (born 1966), Hungarian politician
