= Hungarian Solidarity Movement =

The Party of Solidarity A Szolidaritás Pártja
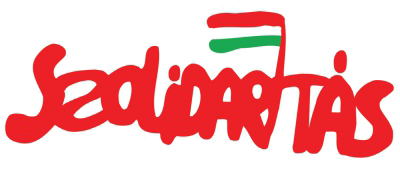
- Abbreviation: Solidarity; Szolidaritás
- Leader: Sándor Székely
- Founded: 1 October 2011
- Headquarters: 3263 Domoszló, II. Rákóczi Ferenc Str. 75.
- Political position: Left-wing to far-left
- Colours: Red, White and Green
- Slogan: Szabadság, Egyenlőség, Szolidaritás! Liberty, Equality, Solidarity!
- National Assembly: 0 / 199
- European Parliament: 0 / 21

Website
- szolidaritasmozgalom.hu

The Party of Solidarity (Hungarian: A Szolidaritás Pártja), formerly Hungarian Solidarity Movement (Hungarian: Magyar Szolidaritás Mozgalom [ˈmɒɟɒr ˈsolidɒritaːʃ ˈmozɡɒlom]) is a political party in Hungary, which was founded in 2011 as an independent political organization against the Cabinet of Orbán. The party's leader is Sándor Székely.

The name and logo of the movement resembles Solidarność, a Polish trade union that advocated for the fall of communism in Poland.

== History ==
Solidarity was founded on 1 October 2011 to 10 individuals, led by Kornél Árok, Tamás Székely, Péter Kónya and Sándor Székely, who is the Armed Forces and Police Workers Advocacy Association (FRDÉSZ) was previously chairman of the trade union.

On 26 October 2012, Solidarity joined the newly formed Together 2014. On 8 March 2013, Together 2014 announced that it would form into a political party with the aim of participating in the parliamentary elections; the new party’s executive committee was led by the three leaders of its three member organizations: Viktor Szigetvári (Patriotism and Progress Association), Péter Kónya (Solidarity) and Péter Juhász (One Million People for Freedom of the Press in Hungary).

In the 2014 parliamentary elections, two of the three MPs of the Together 2014 were members of Solidarity. Péter Kónya was elected from the party list, while Szabolcs Szabó was elected as the representative for the Csepel-Soroksár district.

On 6 September 2014, the General Assembly of Solidarity restructured the organization’s leadership; Sándor Székely was elected executive president, and Péter Kónya was elected social president.

In February 2015, both Kónya and Székely announced their leaving from Together 2014, after which Kónya also left Solidarity to found a new party; however, Székely remained the president of Solidarity.

At the end of 2017, the organization formed an electoral alliance with the Democratic Coalition for the 2018 parliamentary elections. Through the alliance, Székely won a seat in parliament, but at the end of 2018 he left the Democratic Coalition’s parliamentary group and became independent. Székely lost his seat in the 2022 parliamentary election.

In 2025, the organization transformed into a sovereignist left-wing party called The Party of Solidarity.

In the 2026 parliamentary elections, they ran as the Workers’ Party–Solidarity Party Alliance, but failed to win any seats.

== See also ==
- Politics of Hungary
- Together 2014
- Solidarity (Polish trade union)
- Solidarnost
