= Péter Kónya =

Hungarian politician

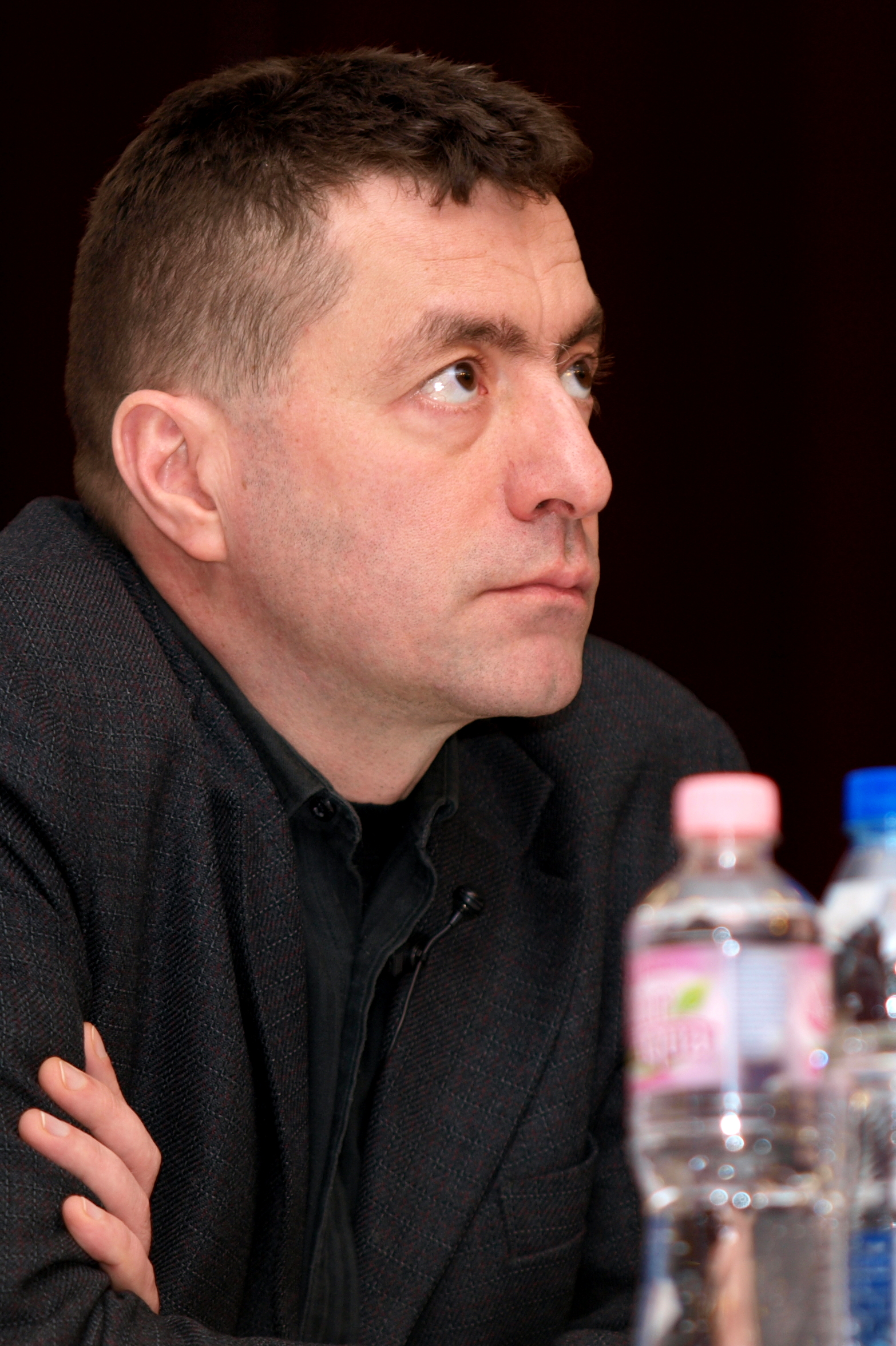
- Péter Kónya in 2013

Member of the National Assembly
- In office 6 May 2014 – 7 May 2018

Co-President of Together alongside Viktor Szigetvári and Péter Juhász
- In office 8 March 2013 – 14 February 2015
- Preceded by: Gordon Bajnai (informal)
- Succeeded by: Viktor Szigetvári (sole)

Personal details
- Born: 19 February 1969 (age 57) Miskolc, Hungary
- Party: Együtt (2012–15); SZKP (since 2016)
- Other political affiliations: Solidarity

Military service
- Allegiance: Hungary
- Branch/service: Hungarian People's Army; Hungarian Defence Forces
- Years of service: 1987–2012
- Rank: Lieutenant colonel

Péter Kónya (born 19 February 1969) is a Hungarian soldier, journalist, trade unionist and politician, who was a Member of Parliament (MP) from 2014 to 2018. As leader of the Hungarian Solidarity Movement, he was a founding member of the Together party until he quit in October 2015.

== Biography ==
Kónya was born in Miskolc on 19 February 1969. He finished his secondary studies at the I. István Secondary Grammar School in Budapest in 1987. He attended the Lviv Polytechnic State University in the Soviet Union, then Ukraine from 1987 to 1991 and from 1993 to 1994, where he earned a degree of military journalist in 1994. Simultaneously, he finished the school of the Association of Hungarian Journalists (MÚOSZ) in 1992. He was a career soldier since 1987, he was inaugurated army officer in 1991; he attended the battalion command course of the Lajos Kossuth Military College in 1992. During his disarmament in 2012, he was a lieutenant-colonel.

He edited military weekly Magyar Honvéd between 1994 and 1998. He was elected president of the Trade Union Association of Military and Police Employees (Fegyveres és Rendvédelmi Dolgozók Érdekvédelmi Szövetsége, FRDÉSZ) in 1998. He also served as co-president of the Democratic Confederation of Free Trade Unions (Liga) from 2005 to 2008. Under his presidency, the FRDÉSZ strongly opposed the amendment of the work code, the termination of private pension system and the revision of the military life model by the Second Orbán Government since 2010. Kónya resigned from that position on 1 December 2011, when entered political sphere.

Kónya was a founding member and inaugural president of the Hungarian Solidarity Movement (Solidarity) in October 2011. It was a social and trade union movement, based on the Polish Solidarity. When former prime minister Gordon Bajnai announced his return to politics on 23 October 2012, during the anti-government demonstration of the One Million for Press Freedom (Milla), the Solidarity also supported his efforts and joined his electoral cooperation named Together 2014. The movement transformed itself into party on 8 March 2013, as only parties could take part in the upcoming election according to the rules. Three co-presidents were elected: Viktor Szigetvári (Patriotism and Progress Association), Péter Kónya (Solidarity) and Péter Juhász (Milla).

Kónya was elected Member of Parliament from the national list of the Unity electoral alliance in the 2014 national election. As an officially independent MP, he became a member of the Agriculture Committee. Solidarity left the Together party in February 2015, because disagreed with the party's internal integration and abolition of the Together's coalition platform system which led to the formation of an unified image party. Its president Kónya also left Together, but retained his parliamentary mandate. Kónya and his some followers left the Hungarian Solidarity Movement in October 2015 in order to establish a political party. He founded the Solidarity for Republic Party (SZKP) in February 2016. Nevertheless, the party, if ever existed, did not participate in the 2018 parliamentary election, thus Kónya lost his parliamentary seat.
