= Péter Juhász =

Péter Juhász may refer to:

- Péter Juhász (footballer) (1948–2024), Hungarian footballer
- Péter Juhász (politician) (born 1971), Hungarian telemarketer, cannabis activist and politician
