= Viktor Szigetvári =

Hungarian politician

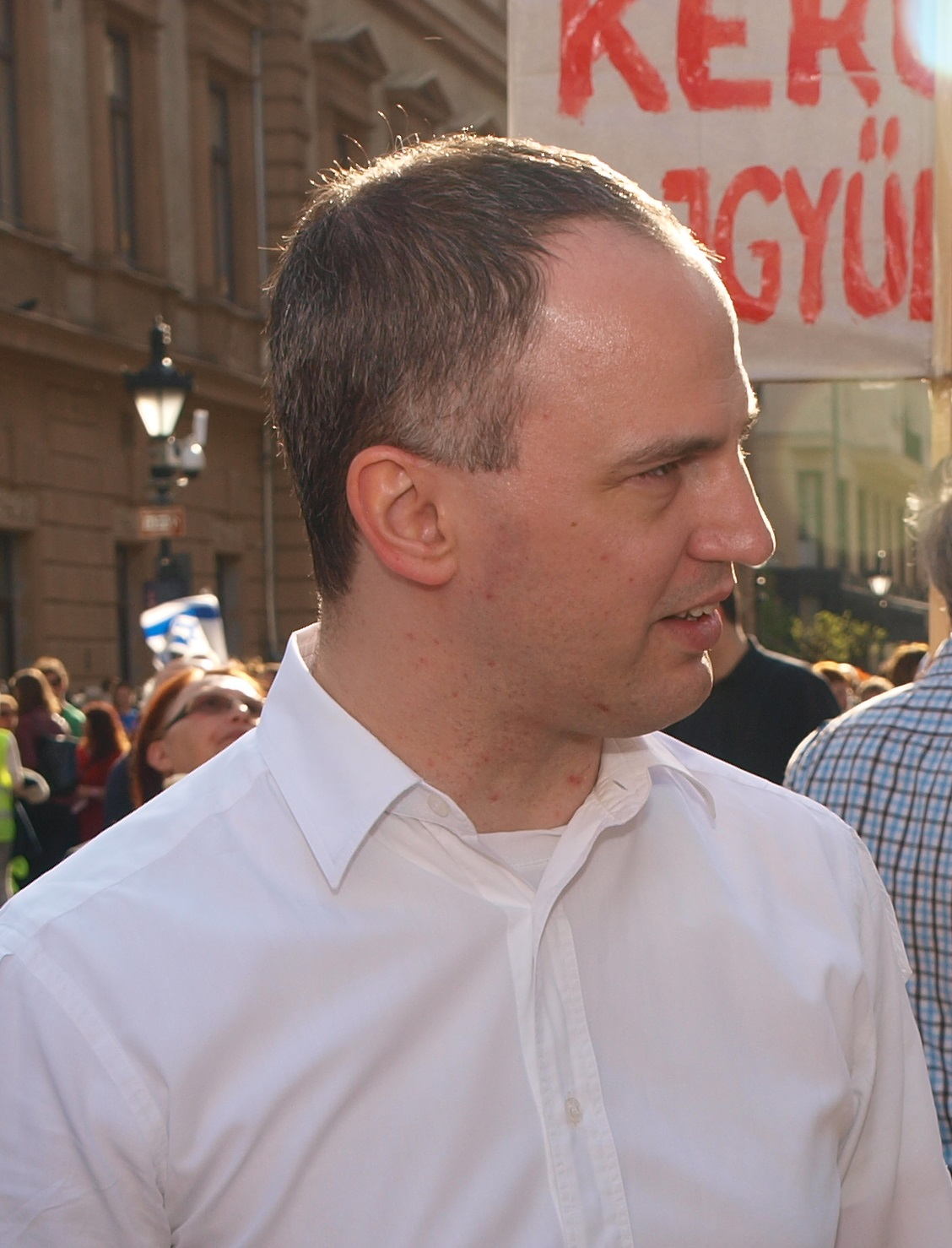
- Szigetvári in 2016

President of Together sole since 14 February 2015
- In office 8 March 2013 – 4 February 2017
- Preceded by: Gordon Bajnai (informal)
- Succeeded by: Péter Juhász

Personal details
- Born: 16 October 1978 (age 46); Budapest
- Political party: MSZP (2009–13); Együtt (2012–18)

Viktor Szigetvári (Szigetvári Viktor, born 16 October 1978 in Budapest) is a Hungarian politician, political scientist and campaign strategist, who served as leader of the Együtt party from 2013 to 2017.

== Career ==
Szigetvári finished his secondary studies at the Piarist Grammar School in Budapest. Following that he attended the Faculty of Humanities of the Eötvös Loránd University (ELTE), where he studied philosophy and political science. Obtaining a degree in 2000, he wrote his thesis with the title of "Tony Blair és az Új Munkáspárt" ("Tony Blair and the New Labour Party") on the subject of Blair's New Labour movement, his consultant was scholar and politician Tibor Navracsics.

=== Socialist Party ===
In 2001, he became associate of Ron Werber, who served as campaign manager of the Hungarian Socialist Party (MSZP) since the early 2000s, and was known for his negative campaigning methods in the 2002 parliamentary election. Szigetvári also actively participated in the campaign, helping to Ferenc Baja, campaign director of the party. He was one of the founders of the European Union Communication Public Foundation (EUKK). Following the Socialists' victory in 2002, Szigetvári was appointed an advisor to Prime Minister Péter Medgyessy, associated with Ferenc Gyurcsány. He served as Head of Secretariat then press agent of the Ministry of Youth and Sports since the summer of 2003. In June 2004, he was appointed head of communication affairs and manager of government ads in the Medgyessy cabinet, and became Deputy Secretary of State within the Prime Minister's Office Public Relations Secretariat, replacing Róbert Braun. Szigetvári retained his position, when Gyurcsány elevated to the position of Prime Minister after the forced resignation of Medgyessy. In May 2005, he became campaign manager for the next parliamentary and local elections, both held in 2006.

Szigetvári founded his think-tank research organization (Szigetvári and Partners Communications Company) in the spring of 2007, which won several government orders in the upcoming years from the Gyurcsány cabinet. After the forming of the Bajnai Government in April 2009, Szigetvári served as the Chief of Staff as Secretary of State to Prime Minister Gordon Bajnai, serving in this capacity until the end of that year. Meanwhile, he joined the Socialist Party itself in August 2009. He was again made national campaign director of the party in the 2010 parliamentary election.

=== Together ===
After the election defeat, he became a member of the Board of Trustees of the Patriotism and Progress Association in 2011, established by ex-Prime Minister Gordon Bajnai and his intellect colleagues. In October 2012, he was elected executive vice-chair of the public foundation. He officially left the Socialist Party in January 2013.

Representing the Patriotism and Progress Association, he was one of the co-presidents, alongside Péter Kónya and Péter Juhász, who were elected on 8 March 2013, when the Together movement transformed itself into party. Following the retirement of Gordon Bajnai in September 2014, Viktor Szigetvári became the only key leader of the party. He was elected sole president in February 2015, against Levente Pápa. On 4 February 2017, Péter Juhász was elected as the party's new leader, replacing Szigetvári, who was elected Chair of the party's National Political Council. In January 2018, Szigetvári was nominated the party's candidate for the position of prime minister for the upcoming parliamentary election. After the Together failed to reach 5% electoral threshold, he retired from politics.
