= Péter Juhász (politician) =

Hungarian telemarketer, activist, and politician

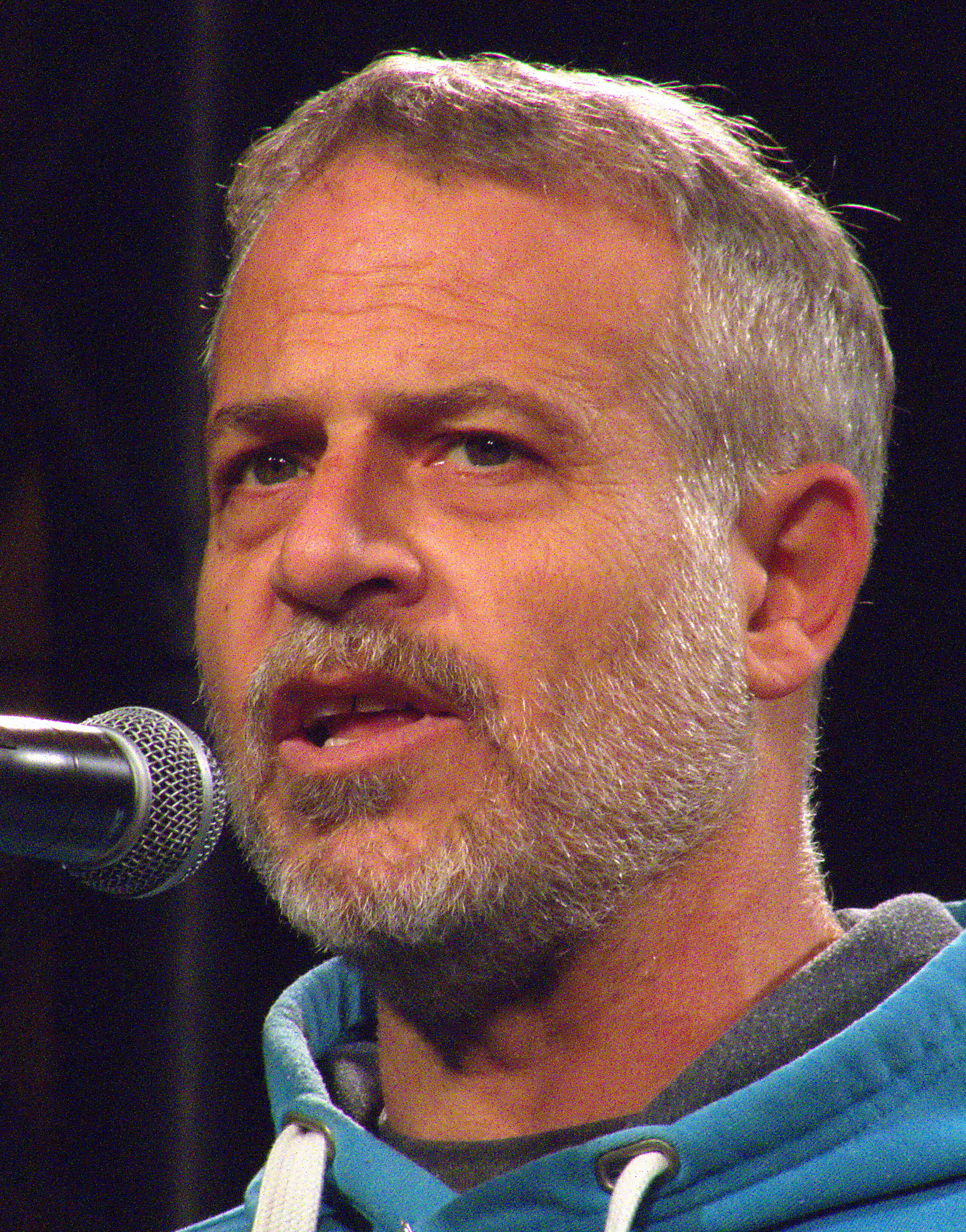
- Juhász in 2025

President of Together
- In office 4 February 2017 – 2 June 2018
- Preceded by: Viktor Szigetvári
- Succeeded by: Party abolished

Co-President of Together alongside Viktor Szigetvári and Péter Kónya
- In office 8 March 2013 – 14 February 2015
- Preceded by: Gordon Bajnai (informal)
- Succeeded by: Viktor Szigetvári (sole)

Personal details
- Born: 27 February 1971 (age 55) Budapest, Hungary
- Party: Együtt (2012–18)

Péter Juhász (born 27 February 1971) is a Hungarian telemarketer, cannabis activist and politician, who served as leader of the Együtt party from February 2017 until its dissolution.

== Business affairs ==
From 1996, Juhász worked for Budapest Bank as an employer and then head of department. He earned a degree of communications and PR at the Kodolányi János University of Applied Sciences (KJF) in 2000. He was involved in various telemarketing, trade and catering companies since 2001. His firm Juhász és Villányi Ltd. went bankrupt in 2003, as well as his other companies Peter, Peter & Partners Ltd. and Ó 17 Ltd. in 2006 and 2008, respectively. He was labelled that he owned various phantom companies to avoid the successful implementation of the tax regulations. Altogether, he owned 11 companies after 2001, six of them went bankrupt and were phantomized.

== Activism ==
Juhász founded the Hemp Seed Association (Kendermag Egyesület) in 2002, which advocated for the legalization of "soft drugs" and the decriminalization of all kinds of drugs. In this capacity, Juhász and other activists organized a so-called "Civil Obedience Movement" in March 2005, under which dozens of cannabis users reported themselves to the police, including Juhász. The Hungarian Civil Liberties Union (TASZ) provided legal assistance and representation for all activists involved in the movement. During the trial, Juhász declared that he grew and used cannabis solely to supply his own personal needs, and also presented a five-foot ripe cannabis plant before the court. In January 2006, he was sentenced to a fine of 70,000 HUF at first instance. The court of second instance confirmed the verdict against Juhász in December 2006; the court declared that Juhász "is extremely dangerous to the society, because he wanted to use criminal prosecution, the instrument of law and the court to proclaim the legalization of drug consumption". TASZ refused the argument and claimed "the courts are also places of freedom of expression".

He acted as spokesperson of the Hemp Seed Association until 2009, following that he was elected its president, replacing László Felső. Juhász vocally supported the ban of the Magyar Gárda in December 2007. He was an organizer of the Tarka Magyar! protest against ethnic and racial exclusion in October 2008. He was an anchorman at the Tilos Rádió from 2008 to 2012, and was a curator of its foundation. Simultaneously, he was also involved in the Romani program of the Hungarian Civil Liberties Union between 2009 and 2012.

== Political career ==
Juhász organized a protest against Prime Minister Viktor Orbán's newly accepted Media Act on 20 December 2010. Thereafter he created a Facebook page named One Million for Press Freedom (Egymillióan a magyar sajtószabadságért), mostly known by its shorter name Milla. The movement participated in numerous protests in the following period and, by 2012, the Facebook page reached 100,000 likes. Juhász and some of his followers founded an association behind the Milla on 10 October 2012, and Juhász was elected its president. Former prime minister Gordon Bajnai announced his return to politics on 23 October 2012, during the anti-government demonstration of the Milla. Bajnai, Juhász and Péter Kónya (Hungarian Solidarity Movement) founded Together 2014 as a coalition of left-wing and liberal political movements and civil organizations to contrast the Orbán cabinet.

According to plans, Together 2014 would have been an umbrella organization of centre-left parties, similar to the Olive Tree in Italy which established against Silvio Berlusconi's right-wing coalition in 1995. However Politics Can Be Different (LMP) had rejected the cooperation in November 2012 and January 2013, and the Hungarian Socialist Party led by Attila Mesterházy gradually took over the initiative. The Together movement transformed itself into party on 8 March 2013, as only parties could take part in the election according to the rules. Three co-presidents were elected: Viktor Szigetvári (Patriotism and Progress Association), Péter Kónya (Solidarity) and Juhász (Milla). The party was registered as "Together – Party for a New Era" because several other organizations overtaken the name "Together 2014" at the National Election Office. After Together entered into an electoral coalition with left-wing parties, including former PM Ferenc Gyurcsány's Democratic Coalition, Juhász offered his resignation and stepped down from his party's national list in the 2014 parliamentary election.

Juhász ran as candidate of the position of mayor of Belváros-Lipótváros (5th District of Budapest) during the 2014 local elections, but received 30.26 percent of the vote and was defeated by Péter Szentgyörgyvölgyi (Fidesz). Nevertheless, he became a member of the local representative body. During his activity, he made public several corruption suspicious real estate transactions from the tenure of the previous Fidesz mayor Antal Rogán.

On 4 February 2017, Juhász was elected as the party's new leader. He resigned as a member of the representative body in the 5th district in April.

Since March, Juhász urged the election cooperation of those "democratic opposition parties", which refuse both the Orbán regime and the former governing left-wing parties, who represent the "world before 2010". Juhász called his concept as "New Pole" (Új Pólus), with the possible participation of the Politics Can Be Different (LMP), the Dialogue for Hungary (PM), the Hungarian Two-tailed Dog Party (MKKP) and the Momentum Movement, in addition to his party. With that statement, Juhász refused the cooperation with the Hungarian Socialist Party (MSZP), the Democratic Coalition (DK) and the Hungarian Liberal Party (MLP) for 2018 parliamentary election. According to a Medián opinion poll published in July 2017, this hypothetical alliance would receive 16 percent of the vote in the next election. While the Together and the PM renewed their alliance in accordance with Juhász's "New Pole" concept on 4 October 2017, both LMP and Momentum Movement had rejected the election cooperation with other parties. On 23 June 2017, MP Zsuzsanna Szelényi announced that she resigned from her position in the party leadership and quit Together, after losing the election for the party leadership in February against Juhász. She also disagreed with the new direction and method of politics, installed by Juhász and criticized the new president's guerrilla campaign methods and media PR campaigns and "ostentatious performances". She also said that she would retain her parliamentary mandate.

In January 2018, leaders of the party announced that Together will participate in the 2018 national election separately. Former party president Viktor Szigetvári was nominated their candidate for the position of prime minister. Juhász intended to run as a candidate in the 5th district of Budapest, but, following a domestic violence scandal, when it was revealed that he assaulted his former life partner physically, (which were later proven false) withdrew his nomination in order to support a single opposition candidate against Fidesz politician István Hollik. The Together party failed to reach 5% electoral threshold, receiving 0.66 percent of the vote. According to the laws, Together had to repay the state aid of HUF 150 million to the state budget, as a result Juhász organized a fundraising campaign. The Together ceased to exist on 2 June 2018.
