= István Varga (politician, born 1956) =

Hungarian politician and economist

Minister of National Development and Economy of Hungary
- In office 29 April 2009 – 29 May 2010
- Preceded by: Gordon Bajnai
- Succeeded by: Tamás Fellegi (Minister of National Development); György Matolcsy (Minister of National Economy)

Personal details
- Born: 23 June 1956 (age 70) Sajószentpéter, People's Republic of Hungary
- Party: Independent
- Children: 3
- Profession: politician, economist

István Varga (born 23 June 1956) is a Hungarian politician and economist, who served as Minister of National Development and Economy between 2009 and 2010. Gordon Bajnai appointed him on 29 April 2009, after Tamás Vahl withdrew from the designation of the ministerial position. Before that the acting economy minister was Péter Hónig between 14 and 29 April. Varga is married and has three children.

Political offices
Preceded by Gordon Bajnai	Minister of National Development and Economy; 2009–2010	Succeeded by Tamás Fellegi; National Development
Preceded by Gordon Bajnai	Minister of National Development and Economy; 2009–2010	Succeeded by György Matolcsy; National Economy
