= Tamás Fellegi =

Hungarian politician, jurist, political scientist and businessman

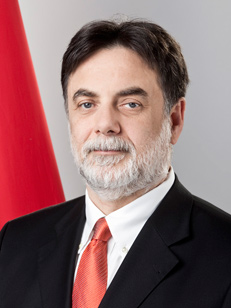

Minister of National Development
- In office 29 May 2010 – 14 December 2011
- Preceded by: István Varga (Minister of National Development and Economy)
- Succeeded by: Tibor Navracsics (Acting)

Personal details
- Born: Tamás László Fellegi; 7 January 1956 (age 70) Budapest, Hungary
- Party: Independent
- Spouse: Ágnes Szokolszky
- Children: 2
- Profession: Politician; economist

Tamás László Fellegi (born 7 January 1956) is a Hungarian politician, jurist, political scientist and businessman who served as Minister of National Development in Viktor Orbán's government from 29 May 2010 to 14 December 2011. After that he was a minister without portfolio in Orbán II Cabinet. Between 1996 and 2000 Sectoral Director, then CEE of Legal and Governmental Affairs of Hungarian Telecom (MATÁV Rt.). Currently, he is Managing Partner of EuroAtlantic Solutions, an international consultancy firm. In 2013, EuroAtlantic Solutions joined the Prime Policy Group consortium and registered as a foreign agent at the U.S. Department of Justice under the Foreign Agent Registration Act for its US-based activities political activities carried out on behalf of the Hungarian government. Fellegi also serves as president of the Hungary Initiatives Foundation, a foundation created in November 2013 at the order Hungary's Prime Minister Viktor Orbán.

== Biography ==
Fellegi graduated in 1974 from Ágoston Trefort high school. In 1976, he was admitted to Faculty of Law of the Eötvös Loránd University, he graduated in 1981. In 1985 he acquired a scholarship to Harvard University.

Upon acquiring his legal degree, he worked at the Institute of Social Sciences (Társadalomtudományi Intézet) of the Hungarian Socialist Workers' Party. He concurrently held a position of assistant professor at the Faculty of Law of the Eötvös Loránd Tudományegyetem. Between 1983 and 1987, he taught courses at the College of Social Sciences (HU: Társadalomtudományi Szakkollégium), today Istvan Bibo College(HU: Bibó István Szakkollégium). He was also founding editor of the periodical Századvég.

In 1987, he returned to America to study and teach at the University of Connecticut. He completed Graduate School and acquired a PhD from Political Sciences. Spent a year in Rochester as a researcher. In summer 1988, he taught a course on Eastern European social movements in New York's New School. Participated in the 1990 transitional Hungarian elections by accompanying Viktor Orbán, the Fidesz – Hungarian Civic Union candidate for Prime Ministership. In 1993, he returned from the United States and until 1997 ta`ught at the Legal Department of Eötvös Loránd University, as well as at the Political School of Századvég. Between 1993 and 1994 he was the political counsellor of Fidesz's chairman and the managing director of DAC Foundation (Democracy After Communism). In 1995, he established his consultancy business by the name of EuroAtlantic Consulting, working for international clients, such as Philip Morris, Mars Inc., RWE, Paks Nuclear Power Plant, MOL, HBO, Microsoft and UPC. Between 1995 és 1996 he was the managing director of EuroAtlantic Communications Ltd. Between 1996 and 2000 he was the Sectoral Director of Hungarian Telecom (MATÁV Rt.), then CEE of legal and governmental issues. From the Summer of 2000 he became the CEO of EuroAtlantic Inc., and between 2007 and 2009 he was the managing director of Kapsch Telematic Services . In 2009 he founded Infocenter.hu Media Investment Inc., as a majority owner, as well as managing director. At the same time, Infocenter.hu Inc. is the 100% owner of Hungarian weekly Heti Válasz and of local Hungarian Radio station Lánchíd. Infocenter.hu is a minority owner of Class FM, Hungarian national commercial radio. On 22 April 2010, he sold all his shares (52%) in Infocenter.hu to Zsolt Nyerges and István Stumpf.

He was appointed to head of the newly formed Ministry of National Development on 29 May 2010, in charge of energy, transport, infocommunication, climate change, EU cohesion and regional development funds. From January to June 2011, he was the President of the European Union's Energy Ministers' Council, Climate Policy Ministers' Council, and Development and Cohesion Funds Council. He also served as Special Government Commissioner for, and Chief Negotiator of Hungarian-Chinese, Hungarian-Russian, and Hungarian-Ukrainian Economic Relations. In December 2011 he was appointed minister without portfolio responsible for negotiations with the International Monetary Fund. He managed the first rounds of the IMF negotiations and left the governmental sector in June 2012. Fellegi was replaced by Mihály Varga on 2 June 2012. He reestablished his international consultancy firm, EuroAtlantic Solutions, he is currently the company's Managing Partner.

== Personal life ==
He is married. His wife is Ágnes Szokolszky, and they have two sons.

== Scientific work ==
T.L.Fellegi: Communism abandoned: transition from authoritarian rule in Hungary, 1985–1990. The University of Connecticut (Ph.D. thesis, 1993)

Fellegi Tamas Laszló: "Regime Transformation and the Mid-Level Bureaucratic Forces in Hungary" in Peter M.E. Volten (ed.), Bound to Change: Consolidating Democracy in East-Central Europe (New York: Institute for East-West Studies, 1992)

Fellegi Tamás László - Orbán Viktor: "Új hegemónia - Ellenzéki mozgalmak Lengyelországban 1980-81", Századvég 3, 1987

Fellegi Tamás, László: Áttekintés az összehasonlító politika fejlődéséről az 50-es évektől napjainkig az amerikai szakirodalomban Kézirat, ELTE LJTK. Politológiai Csoport, Budapest, 1986.

Fellegi, Tamás László:A hegemónia-koncepció Gramsci felfogásában (Adalék egy fogalom értelmezéséhez) Társadalomtudományi Közlemények, 1982. 3. sz. 453. old.

A forradalom hangja. Magyarországi rádióadások 1956. október 23. November 9. (Szerk. Fellegi Tamás László, Gyekiczki András, Kövér László, Kövér Szilárd, Máté János, Orbán Viktor, Stumpf István, Varga Tamás, Wéber Attila) Századvég füzetek 3., A Századvég Kiadó és a Nyilvánosság Klub közös kiadása, Budapest, 1989.

Az igazság Nagy Imre ügyében (Szerk. Fellegi Tamás László, Gyekiczki András, Gyurgyák János, Kövér László Századvég Kiadó-Nyilvánosság Klub, Századvég füzetek 2. Budapest, 1989

Orosz szocializmus Közép-Európában (Szerk.: Fellegi Tamás László, Gyekiczki András, Gyurgyák János, Kövér László, Kövér Szilárd) Századvég füzetek 4., Századvég Kiadó, Budapest 1989. Az orosz kommunizmus értelme és eredete Szerzők: Csicskó Mária, Nyikolaj Bergyajev et al. (Szerk.: Fellegi Tamás László Gyekiczki András Gyurgyák János) Századvég Kiadó, Századvég füzetek 5., Budapest, 1989.

Századvég 1989/1-2. A Bibó István Szakkollégium társadalomelméleti folyóirata Szerzők: Csicskó Mária, Kende Péter, Pető Iván, Simon Róbert (Szerk.: Fellegi Tamás László, Gyekiczki András, Gyurgyák János) Századvég, Budapest, 1989.

Századvég 1990/2. Népiek és urbánusok - egy mítosz vége? 2. szám. Szerzők: Heller Mária, Karády Viktor, Némedi Dénes, Nyikolaj Bergyajev, Rényi Ágnes Szabó Miklós, Szilágyi Ákos) (Szerk.: Fellegi Tamás László, Gyekiczki András, Gyurgyák János, Kövér László, Kövér Szilárd, Máté János, Orbán Viktor, Sasfi Csaba, Sós Adrienne, Stumpf István, Varga Tamás, Wéber Attila) Századvég Kiadó, Budapest, 1990.

== Sources ==
- The webpage of EuroAtlantic Solutions
- Fellegi Tamás Linkedin profile
- Tamás Fellegi's CV
- Press release on selling Infocenter.hu

Political offices
Preceded by István Varga	Minister of National Development; 2010–2011	Succeeded by Tibor Navracsics
