= György Matolcsy =

Hungarian politician and economist

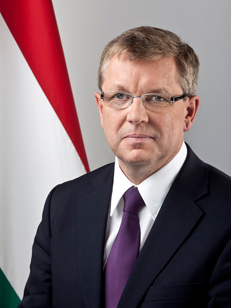

Governor of the Hungarian National Bank
- In office 4 March 2013 – 4 March 2025
- Preceded by: András Simor
- Succeeded by: Mihály Varga

Minister of National Economy
- In office 29 May 2010 – 3 March 2013
- Prime Minister: Viktor Orbán
- Preceded by: István Varga (National Development and Economy); Péter Oszkó (Finance)
- Succeeded by: Mihály Varga

Minister of Economy
- In office 1 January 2000 – 27 May 2002
- Prime Minister: Viktor Orbán
- Preceded by: Attila Chikán
- Succeeded by: István Csillag

Member of the National Assembly
- In office 16 May 2006 – 3 March 2013

Personal details
- Born: György Huba Matolcsy; 18 July 1955 (age 71) Budapest, Hungary
- Party: Fidesz
- Spouse: Zita Vajda
- Children: Ádám; Máté Huba
- Profession: Politician, economist

György Huba Matolcsy (born 18 July 1955) is a Hungarian politician and economist who was governor of the Hungarian National Bank (MNB) for 12 years until March 2025. He previously served as Minister of National Economy from 2000 to 2002 during the first cabinet of Viktor Orbán and from 2010 to 2013 in the second Orbán Cabinet.

== Career ==
In 1977, he graduated from the Faculty of Economics of Corvinus University of Budapest, at that time known as the Karl Marx University of Economics and Industry, and in 1984 received a PhD in economics from the same institution, the only university in Hungary before the fall of Communism where one could graduate from economics. He worked as an expert in economic institutions.

In 1990 he became for a brief period of parliamentary secretary in the Prime Minister József Antall period. In 1991-1994 he was a representative of the Hungarian Government, the European Bank for Reconstruction and Development in London, including a deputy director in the period 1991-1994, and in 1994 director of the bank. After returning to the country was among others Fidesz's economic expert, member of the National Assembly, and in 2000-2002, minister of economy. In 2003 he joined the Fidesz. On 29 May 2010 he became minister of national economy in the second Orbán cabinet.

He said in October 2011 the return to talks with IMF would be a "clear sign of weakness". He also said in the Parliament on 14 November 2011, just four days before the ministry's announcement, in a response to a Jobbik politician, "the government forming its economic policy against this three-letter institution [IMF]."

On 17 November 2011 the Ministry of National Economy said "government is starting negotiations on a new type of cooperation with the International Monetary Fund (IMF) in the course of scheduled consultations."

On 1 March 2013, Prime Minister Orbán nominated Matolcsy to the position of the Head of the Hungarian National Bank (MNB). Orbán said "performance and the facts point towards one man, and that is György Matolcsy." The Hungarian forint had steadily dropped when became official information that Matolcsy will be appointed governor. He took the office on 4 March, replacing András Simor.

He is the author of publications in the field of economics. The book, entitled Economic Balance and Growth, was published on 5 March 2015 and was translated and published in English in December 2015. It is the first of the Magyar Nemzeti Bank's book series.

== Criticism ==
Numerous economists and banking experts have been critical of Matolcsy's unorthodox actions regarding the Hungarian National Bank's monetary policy, including former World Bank director Lajos Bokros and Raiffeisen Bank (Hungary) former CEO Péter Felcsuti. In an English language interview with Hungarian news website The Budapest Beacon, Bokros criticized Matolcsy for being a political appointee who knows nothing about monetary economics. Felcsuti said of Matolcsy, "To suggest that he is a lunatic wouldn’t be fair. He has a view which is basically very critical of the neoliberal economic school. It’s very Keynesian. He doesn't believe in the market and he believes much more in the government that guides or directs the market. I’ll say that much about him. These are things that can be said within the frame of academic debate."

=== Accusations of corruption ===
In 2019, the Supreme Court of Hungary ruled that there was sufficient factual basis that accusing György Matolcsy of stealing public money did not constitute libel.

In March 2025, the Hungarian state audit office wrote a report finding that the bank, and its leader, György Matolcsy took part in laundering of 500 billion forints (approximately 1.2 billion euros) worth of money. It has been described in Hungarian media as the biggest bank robbery in world history, as it has surpassed Saddam Hussein $1B heist of the national bank of Iraq, which is often mentioned as such.

In October 2026, Matolcsy was arrested on suspicion of fraud. The prosecutor's office said that this was in relation to corruption where he was handed control of public funds through a private equity fund in order to personally profit.

Political offices
Preceded by Attila Chikán	Minister of Economy; 2000–2002	Succeeded by István Csillag
Preceded by István Varga	Minister of National Economy; 2010–2013	Succeeded by Mihály Varga
Preceded by András Simor	Governor of the Hungarian National Bank; 2013–2025	Succeeded by Mihály Varga
