= Mihály Varga =

Hungarian politician (born 1965)

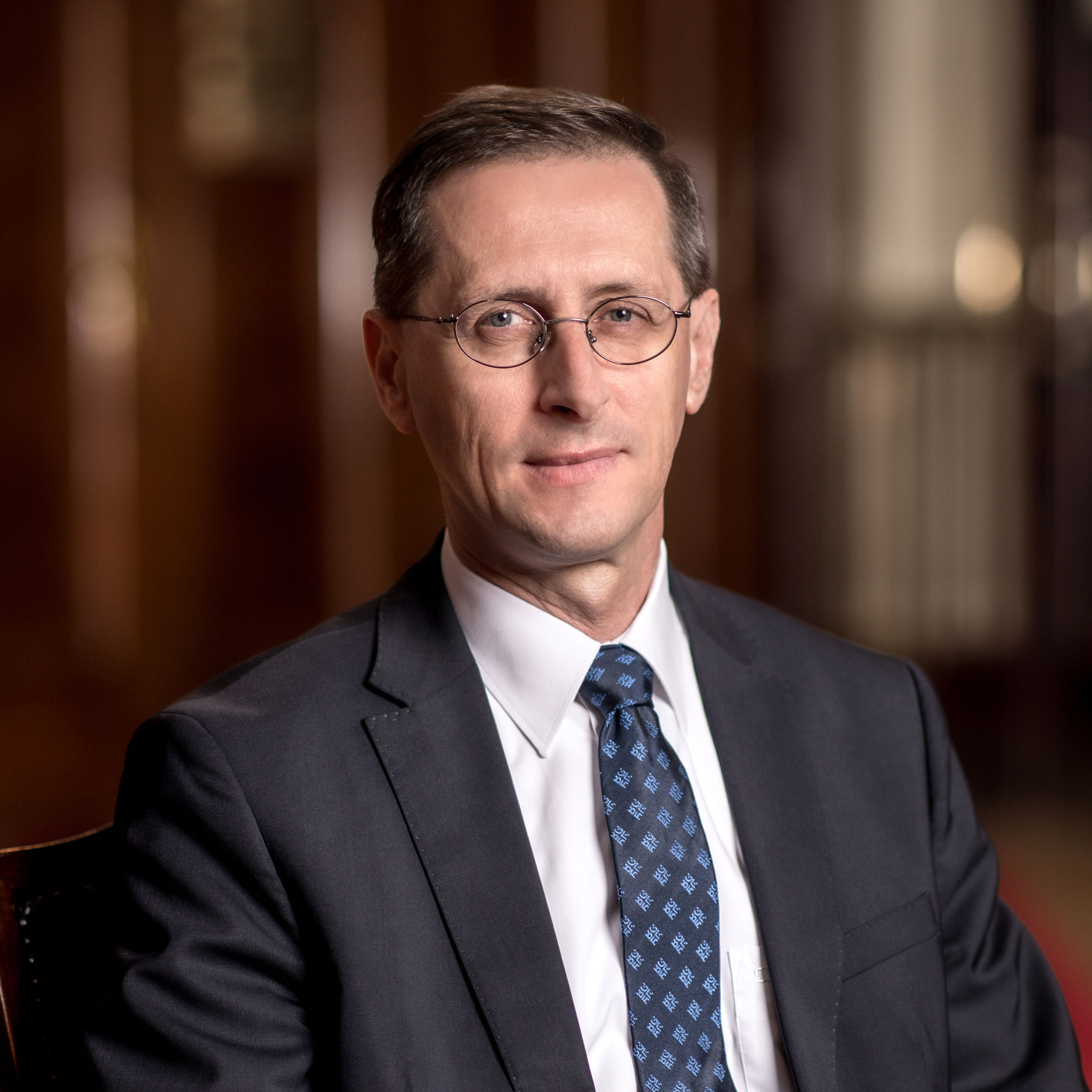
- Varga in 2020

Governor of the Hungarian National Bank
- Incumbent
- Assumed office 4 March 2025
- Preceded by: György Matolcsy

Deputy Prime Minister of Hungary
- In office 22 May 2018 – 24 May 2022 Serving with Zsolt Semjén and Sándor Pintér
- Prime Minister: Viktor Orbán

Minister of Finance
- In office 7 March 2013 – 31 December 2024
- Prime Minister: Viktor Orbán
- Preceded by: György Matolcsy (as Minister of National Economy)
- Succeeded by: Márton Nagy (as Minister of National Economy)
- In office 1 January 2001 – 27 May 2002
- Prime Minister: Viktor Orbán
- Preceded by: Zsigmond Járai
- Succeeded by: Csaba László

Member of the National Assembly
- In office 26 September 1994 – 21 February 2025
- In office 2 May 1990 – 27 June 1994

Personal details
- Born: 26 January 1965 (age 61) Karcag, Hungary
- Party: Fidesz
- Spouse: Szilvia Sántha
- Children: 4
- Education: Corvinus University

Mihály Varga (born 26 January 1965) is a Hungarian politician and the governor of the Hungarian National Bank since 2025. He served as Minister of Finance (previously Minister of National Economy) from 2013 to 2024. He also served as Minister of Finance between 2001 and 2002. He has been a member of Fidesz since the party's founding in 1988. He was one of the party's four vice presidents between 2005 and 2013.

== Early life and education ==
Varga studied at Gábor Áron Secondary School in Karcag and finishing in 1983. He graduated in trade from Karl Marx University of Economic Science of Budapest in 1989. After defending his thesis he served as an auditor at the State Construction Company No. 43 in Budapest, and then became an economist at the East Hungary Water Planning Company in Szolnok in 1990.

== Political career ==
At the end of December 1988, Varga joined the Alliance of Young Democrats (Fidesz). He was the founder of the Szolnok county Fidesz group. He became a member of Fidesz's National Board in 1990, and served as its chairman in 1992–1993. From 1993 to 1995, he was chairman of the party's organisation in Jász-Nagykun-Szolnok County. From 1994 to 2003, he was the party's national deputy chairman, a member of the National Board and director of the party's Management Office. He has chaired the Karcag constituency since the autumn of 2003. He has been a member of the Parliament since 1990 elected from the national list in 1990 and co-opted on 26 September 1994; elected to represent: Constituency 8, Karcag, Jász-Nagykun-Szolnok County in 1998. From 1995 to 1998 he was Deputy Group Leader.

From 14 July 1998 to 31 December 2000, Varga was Parliamentary Secretary of the Ministry of Finance. Since 1 January 2001, an until 27 May 2002, he served as Minister of Finance. He secured an individual mandate from Karcag once again in the 2002 Hungarian parliamentary election. On finishing his governmental duties he became leader of the Budget and Finance Committee. He secured a seat in Parliament in the 2006 Hungarian parliamentary election from Jász-Nagykun-Szolnok county 8.constituency. He was elected chairman of the Committee on Budget, Finance and Audit Office on 30 May 2006.

Varga became state secretary of the Prime Minister's Office in 2010. His role was to maintain a contact between the Prime Minister Viktor Orbán and the ministers. He was appointed Minister without portfolio for liaising with international financial organisations, replacing Tamás Fellegi, on 2 June 2012. Varga was succeeded by János Lázár as Head of the Prime Minister's Office. He was appointed Minister of National Economy on 4 March 2013, replacing György Matolcsy. The position was renamed the Minister of Finance on 18 May 2018.

== Other activities ==
- European Bank for Reconstruction and Development (EBRD), Ex-Officio Member of the Board of Governors (since 2013)

== Public life ==
Varga served as vice president of the Hungarian - Kazakh Friendship Society from 1997. In 2000, he became a member of the Order of the Knights of St. John. He became presbyter of the Reformed Church of Karcag and a member of the Rákóczi Association in 2001. In 2003, he became Chairman of the Nagykun Civic Association. He is an honorary professor of the Szolnok Business School (Szolnoki Gazdasági Főiskola).

== Personal life ==
Varga is married to Szilvia Sántha, a chemist. They have four children together. Varga is a member of the Reformed Church in Hungary.

Political offices
Preceded by Zsigmond Járai	Minister of Finance; 2001–2002	Succeeded by Csaba László
Preceded by Csaba Molnár	Minister of the Prime Minister's Office; 2010–2012	Succeeded by János Lázár
Preceded by György Matolcsy	Minister of National Economy; 2013–2018	Succeeded by Himself
Preceded by Himself	Minister of Finance; 2018–2024	Succeeded by Márton Nagy
Preceded by György Matolcsy	Governor of the Hungarian National Bank; 2025–	Incumbent
