= Csaba László (politician) =

Hungarian politician

Minister of Finance of Hungary
- In office 27 May 2002 – 15 February 2004
- Preceded by: Mihály Varga
- Succeeded by: Tibor Draskovics

Personal details
- Born: 4 October 1962 (age 62); Debrecen, Hungarian People's Republic
- Political party: Independent
- Children: 2
- Profession: politician, economist

Csaba László (born 4 October 1962) is a Hungarian politician, who served as Minister of Finance between 2002 and 2004. During his ministership the state budget deficiency rose and the macroeconomic indicators were spoiling because of the so-called "hundred-day program". He was succeeded by Tibor Draskovics.

Political offices
Preceded by Mihály Varga	Minister of Finance; 2002–2004	Succeeded by Tibor Draskovics
