= Ferenc Baja =

Hungarian politician (born 1955)

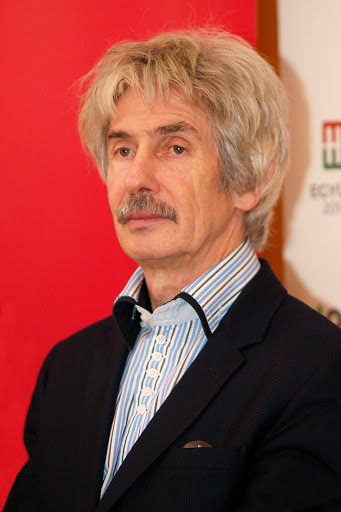

Minister of Environment and Regional Development
- In office 15 July 1994 – 8 July 1998
- Preceded by: János Gyurkó
- Succeeded by: Pál Pepó

Member of the National Assembly
- In office 28 June 1994 – 5 May 2014

Personal details
- Born: 4 July 1955 (age 70) Kecskemét, Hungary
- Party: MSZMP (1988–1989); MSZP (since 1989)
- Children: 1
- Profession: Politician

Dr Ferenc Baja (born 4 July 1955) is a Hungarian politician, who served as Minister of Environment and Regional Development between 1994-98.

He was a member of the National Assembly from 1994 to 2014.

== Career ==
He finished Zipernowsky Károly Secondary Technical School of High Voltage Electrical Industry in Pécs in 1974 following his military service he studied in Szeged for a year, then enrolled in the Faculty of Arts of Kossuth Lajos University in Debrecen, where he acquired a degree in cultural education in 1982, then a doctoral title in film aesthetics. While a student, he was employed by the Hajdú-Bihar County Motion Pictures Company. He worked for the Nyíregyháza City Council from 1983, first as a cultural education officer, then from 1988 as general deputy head of council. From 1990 he was the director of the Nyíregyháza City Gallery.

In the 1988 local by-election in Nyíregyháza he was elected council member, then joined the Hungarian Socialist Workers' Party (MSZMP). He was a member of the General Assembly of Nyíregyháza from 1990 to 1994. A founding member of the Hungarian Socialist Party (MSZP), he has been a member of the National Board since 1990 and has held the position of local government executive of the presidium. He was deputy chairman of the party from 1992 to 1996 and presided the National Board until 1998. In 1992 he was a founding member and Chairman of the Community of Left-wing Municipalities.

He ran in the 1990 parliamentary election. He has been a Member of Parliament since 1994 (representing Nyíregyháza, Constituency II, Szabolcs-Szatmár-Bereg County in 1994, and elected from the party's Szabolcs-Szatmár-Bereg County Regional List in 1998, the party's National List since 2006). During the term of the Gyula Horn Cabinet, he held the position of Minister of Environment and Regional Development. He was Chairman of the Szabolcs-Szatmár-Bereg County branch of the Hungarian Socialist Party from 1999, then as party director from November 2000 to May 2002.

In the parliamentary election in April 2002 he secured a seat from the Szabolcs-Szatmár-Bereg County Regional List. He held the position of Political Secretary of State of the Prime Minister's Office in charge of civil society relations and information in preparation for European integration since June 2002. In the 2006 parliamentary election he was elected on the National List of the party. From 1 January 2007 to 29 May 2010, he served as Secretary of State of the Prime Minister' Office during the cabinets of Ferenc Gyurcsány and Gordon Bajnai.
