= Alexandra Dobolyi =

Hungarian politician

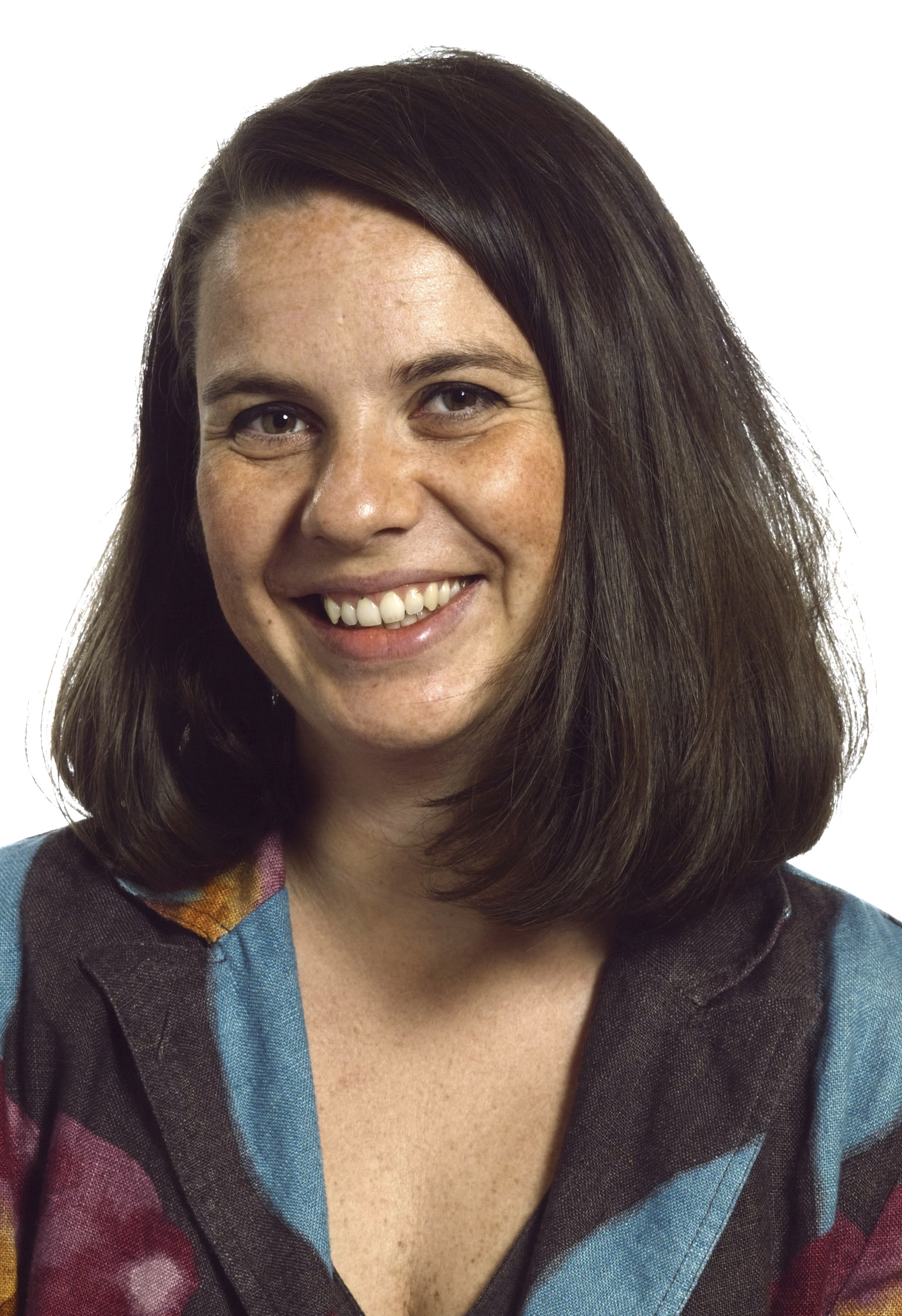
Alexandra Dobolyi in 2004

Alexandra Dobolyi (born September 26, 1971) is a Hungarian politician. She is a former Member of the European Parliament (MEP) for the Hungarian Socialist Party, part of the Party of European Socialists group. Dobolyi was an MEP from 2004 to 2009.

== Early life ==
Alexandra Dobolyi was born on 26 September 1971 in Budapest, Hungary. Her early education was at Petőfi Sándor High School in Budapest.

== European Parliament ==
Dobolyi stood as a candidate for the Hungarian Socialist Party in the 2004 European parliamentary election. She was elected as one of its nine MEPs in Hungary. Dobolyi was part of the Party of European Socialists group. In the European Parliament, Dobolyi was a member of the Committee on Development, Committee on Petitions, and was part of the delegation for relations with the Korean Peninsula and the ACP-EU Joint Parliamentary Assembly.

== Personal life ==
She is married to politician and former Finance Minister János Veres.
