= Péter Oszkó =

Hungarian politician and jurist

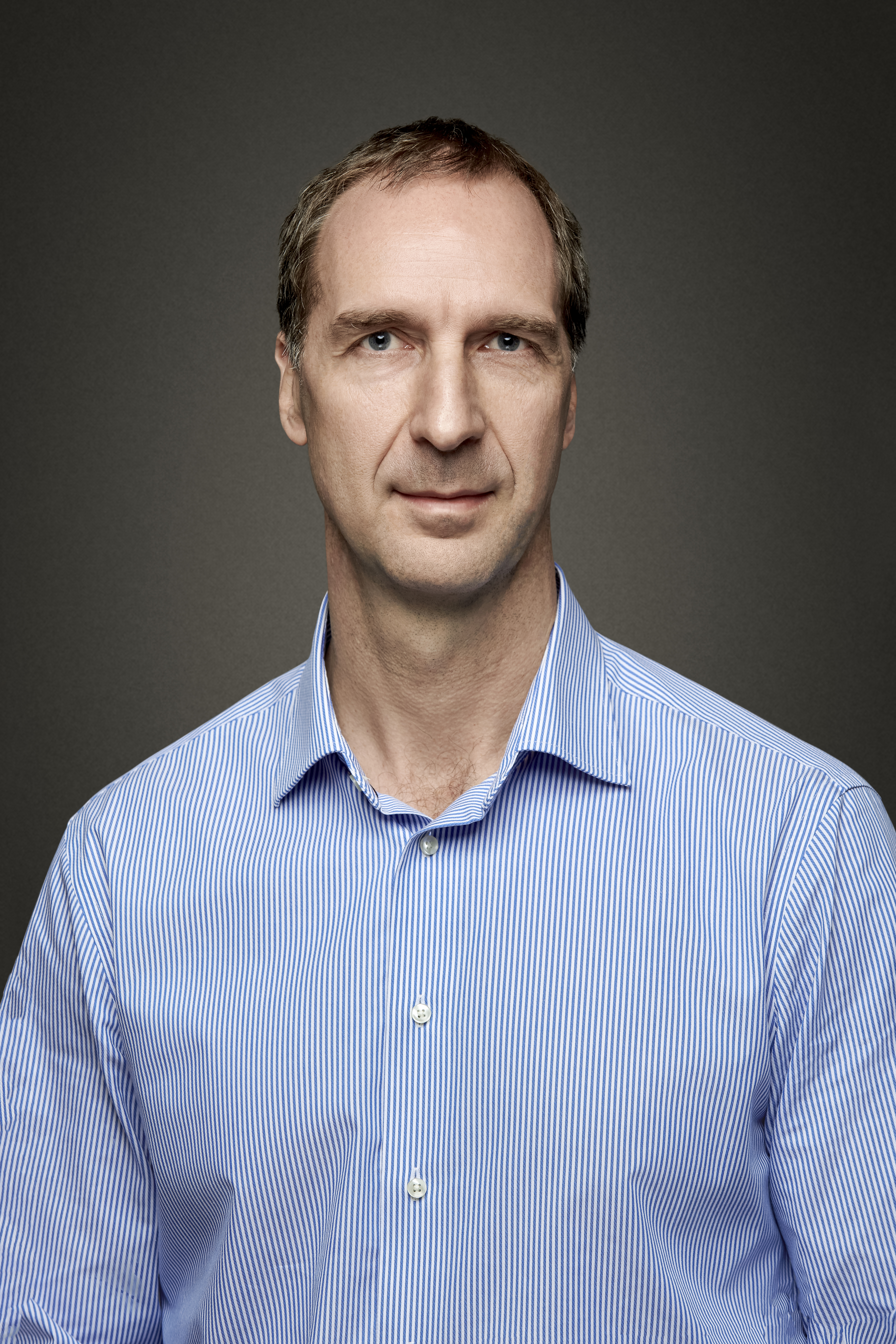

Minister of Finance of Hungary
- In office 16 April 2009 – 29 May 2010
- Preceded by: János Veres
- Succeeded by: György Matolcsy (National Economy)

Personal details
- Born: March 22, 1973 (age 52) Budapest, People's Republic of Hungary
- Party: Independent
- Profession: Businessman, Venture capitalist, Politician

Péter Oszkó (born 22 March 1973 in Budapest) is a Hungarian politician, businessman, venture capitalist, jurist and the Minister of Finance of the Bajnai administration in Hungary between 2009 and 2010.

== Education ==
His parents were engineers, and his father was a hydraulic engineer. In elementary school, he was interested in mathematics, in the Ferenc Kölcsey bilingual high school he was more interested in humanities. Originally, he wanted to pursue a degree in Humanities (his main interest was literature and French) but finally, he graduated from the Law faculty of the Eötvös Loránd University (ELTE), in 1997. As he later said, he was interested in mathematics, however, pursuing a degree in economics was not an option at the time. „Law students generally do not like maths, I was one of the few who enjoyed financial law” – he said.

At the university he was active in community affairs, he was elected to be the president of the student council of the faculty, later of the university (from 1 April 1995), he was elected to be a vice president of the national student council federation, he took an active role in founding the association later known as HÖOK (Country-wide Conference of Student Councils).

== Career ==
His first job was at KPMG the international audit and consulting company. He was working at the London office of KPMG, where he was working for large multinational financial institutions as part of an international consulting team between the summer of 2000 and the spring of 2001. In 2001, he joined the Hungarian office of the international law firm Freshfields Bruckhaus Deringer as the head of the tax consultancy unit of the company.

In 2004 he joined Deloitte as a partner, from 1 January 2006, he was appointed to be the head of the tax consulting line of business, and later when András Simor chairman and CEO became the Governor of the Magyar Nemzeti Bank (National Bank of Hungary) in the spring of 2007, Mr. Oszkó took his place at the company at a remarkably young age which is not common at the company. He took his new role on 1 June 2007 from Alastair Teare, who was heading the company temporarily. According to him, the key factors contributing to his fast and successful consulting career were that he was dealing with a wider range of general professional issues compared to his colleagues and he was fondly cooperating with the media, he utilized his numerous opportunities for media appearance with growing experience.

From 1998, he taught taxation at the Faculty of Law of ELTE as an external lecturer. He was one of the regular authors of the publication titled: “Practical tax advisor”. Since the 2000s he has regularly published in economic journals and newspapers, including the Hungarian weeklies HVG (World Economy Weekly) and Figyelő (Observer), the Hungarian daily Világgazdaság (World Economy), but some of his work also appeared in the Harvard Business Review, the Wall Street Journal, and the Financial Times.

After his term as Minister of Finance, he retained his role as a public economic analyst, but from then on, he worked on scaling up innovative, typically technological enterprises in Hungary and in the region as a professional mentor, strategic consultant, and investor. From 2010, he headed the venture capital business unit of OTP group, then in 2014, he decided to become independent, forming his own group of companies under the brand name OXO, within the framework of which he continued his investment and consulting activities aiming at early-stage and start-up companies helping them to grow using his own funds and those of co-investors. In 2014, he launched his startup accelerator under the name OXO Labs, in 2015 he founded an investment company called Power Angels with a group of Hungarian business angels. In 2017 he established his venture capital fund management company under the name OXO Ventures, which is already a regional market player by launching larger new investment funds. In 2019 Power Angels, the first angel fund of OXO was closed at 4X DPI, at the same time OXO Technologies Holding, a new investment vehicle of the group started its activity with the participation of private and institutional investors. OXO Technologies Holding was later listed on the Budapest Stock Exchange and extended its early and growth stage investment activity beyond the CEE countries across the whole Europe.

== His role in public life ==
In the spring of 2006, Mr. Oszkó took part in preparing a study by the research institute Central European Management Intelligence (CEMI) that explored the structural problems of the Hungarian economy and government budget, urging changes. Among numerous other similar initiatives, he participated in the elaboration of the alternative economic program of the civil organization Reformszövetség (Reform Alliance) founded at the end of 2008, and ended in the spring of 2009, as the head of the workgroup dealing with proposals for reforming the tax and contributions system.

As a result of many public professional activities he was invited to take the position of the Minister of Finance as a technocrat government member when the previous government resigned during the 2008 financial crisis. He held the position between April 2009 and May 2010 for one year until the next general elections and took responsibility for significant cuts in public spendings, tax and pension reforms as well as restoring market financing of the state budget and improving the balance of payment.

He stayed active in public life after his one-year-long term as Minister of Finance in Hungary’s government of experts (also known as the Bajnai government or Bajnai administration), he frequently publishes his studies and analyses in professional publications, journals, as well as in his own online sites.

== Private life ==
His hobbies include squash, rock climbing, playing chess, photography, and playing the blues harmonica. Earlier he played the piano, which he taught himself but he switched to playing the harmonica, which he learned with the help of the internet because it was less time-consuming. He used to play in several blues, blues rock, and jazz-rock bands. Until 2015 he played in a band called Blue sPot (video from April 2009:)., since then he occasionally plays in Christopher Mattheisen‘s band, the Americana Project. “These are different times: nowadays you are considered to be weird if you do not have some sort of obsession outside of work” – he once said in an interview (March 2009), on playing music. He joined the organization of Hungary’s most prestigious festival of all arts, Művészetek Völgye (Valley of Arts) through his passion for music starting in 2010. Through his contribution, the festival was renewed in terms of content and finances and got stabilized.

He joined the first company he worked for with shoulder-length hair he had been wearing for 10 years. When he finally had his hair cut, his bosses told him they did not know how to tell him that this was not the right appearance for this job.

His colleagues praise his networking skills. He is fluent in English and French apart from his native tongue of Hungarian.

== Recognition ==
· In 2007 he became Young Manager of the Year.

Political offices
Preceded by János Veres	Minister of Finance; 2009–2010	Succeeded by post abolished
