= Together (Hungary) =

Together Együtt
- First leader: Gordon Bajnai
- Last leader: Péter Juhász
- Founded: 26 October 2012 (alliance); 8 March 2013 (party)
- Dissolved: 2 June 2018
- Ideology: Social liberalism; Liberalism; Pro-Europeanism
- Political position: Centre to centre-left
- Colours: Yellow

Party flag

Website
- egyuttpart.hu

Together (Hungarian: Együtt, pronounced [ˈɛɟːytː]), officially Together – Party for a New Era (Hungarian: Együtt – A Korszakváltók Pártja), formerly also known as Together 2014 (Hungarian: Együtt 2014), was a social liberal political party in Hungary formed on 26 October 2012 for the 2014 Hungarian parliamentary election by Gordon Bajnai, the former Prime Minister of Hungary, to contest Viktor Orbán's government. Together was founded as a coalition of left-wing and liberal political movements and civil organizations that transformed itself into a party in March 2013.

The party had formed an electoral alliance with the Dialogue for Hungary (PM) and they won together four seats in the national assembly and one seat in the European Parliament in 2014. Together dissolved after its poor performance in the 2018 parliamentary election.

== Members ==
During its foundation, the coalition consisted of three civil society organizations:

- Patriotism and Progress Association led by Gordon Bajnai. The Patriotism and Progress Public Policy Foundation formed after the 2010 elections, which prepared several professional programs and proposal for the government. The organization transformed to association in October 2012.
- One Million for Press Freedom (Milla) led by Péter Juhász, originally a Facebook group, which formed against the Viktor Orbán's cabinet Media Act on 20 December 2010. Milla officially abolished in April 2014 following an annual passivity.
- Hungarian Solidarity Movement led by Péter Kónya, a social and trade union movement, based on the Polish Solidarity, formed on 4 October 2011. Solidarity left the Together party in February 2015, because disagreed with the party's internal integration and abolition of Together's coalition platform system which led to the formation of an unified image party.

== History ==
Gordon Bajnai announced his return to politics on 23 October 2012, during the anti-government demonstration of the One Million for Press Freedom (Milla). On the protest, he called for an anti-Orbán coalition so as to form a supermajority in Parliament with the help of which the changes done by Orbán's ruling party, Fidesz could be undone.

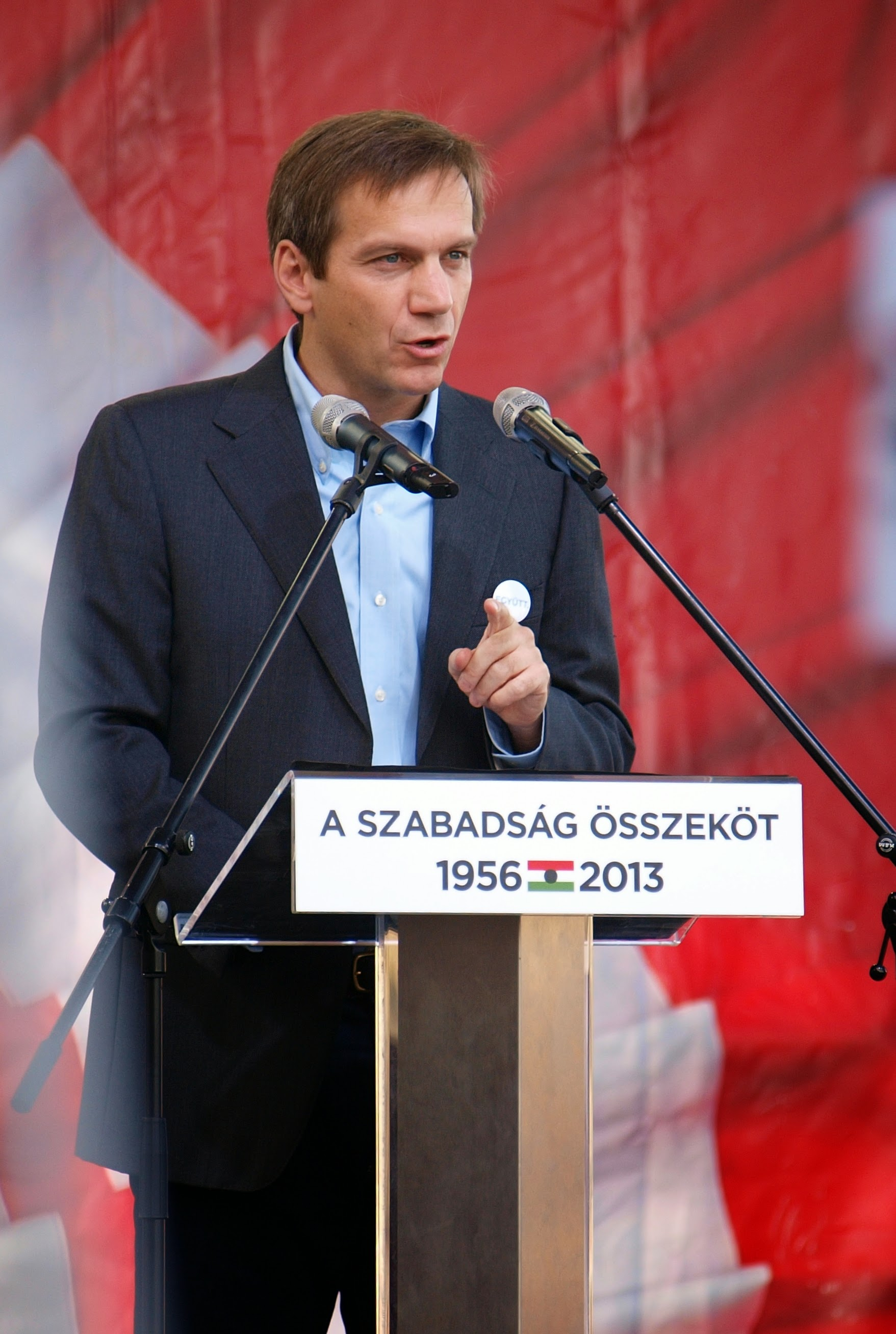
Ex-prime minister Gordon Bajnai, who announced the establishment of the Together alliance on 23 October 2012

In his speech, Bajnai repeatedly used a variant of the term ("We may fail on our own, but together, we shall prove victorious!"), when he proclaimed his support for such a "cooperation between hopeful left-wingers, disappointed rightwingers, politically abandoned free-thinkers and committed Greens" that his organization along with two other civilian body named Together 2014 as a reference to the date of the next general elections in Hungary. In December 2012, Bajnai announced that he intends to be a parliamentarian candidate in the 2014 general election.

According to plans, Together 2014 would have been an umbrella organization of centre-left parties, similar to the Olive Tree in Italy which established against Silvio Berlusconi's right-wing coalition in 1995. However Politics Can Be Different (LMP) had rejected the cooperation in November 2012 and January 2013, and the Hungarian Socialist Party led by Attila Mesterházy gradually took over the initiative.

The Together movement transformed itself into party on 8 March 2013, as only parties could take part in the election according to the rules. Three co-presidents were elected: Viktor Szigetvári (Patriotism and Progress Association), Péter Kónya (Solidarity) and Péter Juhász (Milla). The party was registered as "Together – Party for a New Era" because several other organizations overtaken the name "Together 2014" at the National Election Office.

On 14 January 2014, five opposition parties, including Together, entered into a coalition and formed Unity alliance. Contrary to his earlier plans, Bajnai could not reach to become joint Prime Minister candidate of the left-wing opposition since Attila Mesterházy (MSZP) was appointed to that position. The Unity suffered a heavy defeat and Together won only three mandates within the alliance and was unable to form a parliamentary group. The Together–Dialogue for Hungary alliance received 7.25% of the votes in the 2014 European Parliament election and gained one seat (Benedek Jávor, co-leader of the Dialogue for Hungary).

Following the retirement of Gordon Bajnai in September 2014, Viktor Szigetvári became the only key leader of the party. He was elected sole president in February 2015, against Levente Pápa.

On 24 September 2016, the delegate assembly decided to participate in the next parliamentary election with a separate national list. Together also announced its intention of selection of joint opposition individual candidates through primaries in each constituencies.

The party's campaign banner for the 2018 parliamentary election

On 4 February 2017, Péter Juhász was elected as the party's new leader. On the same day, Balázs Berkecz and Nóra Hajdú were elected as vice-presidents, and Viktor Szigetvári as the leader of the party's National Political Council (the board of the party). Since March, Juhász urged the election cooperation of those "democratic opposition parties", which refuse both the Orbán regime and the former governing left-wing parties, who represent the "world before 2010". Juhász called his concept as "New Pole" (Új Pólus), with the possible participation of the Politics Can Be Different (LMP), the Dialogue for Hungary (PM), the Hungarian Two-tailed Dog Party (MKKP) and the Momentum Movement, in addition to his party. With that statement, Juhász refused the cooperation with the Hungarian Socialist Party (MSZP), the Democratic Coalition (DK) and the Hungarian Liberal Party (MLP). According to a Medián opinion poll published in July 2017, this hypothetical alliance would receive 16 percent of the vote in the next election. While Together and the PM renewed their alliance in accordance with Juhász's "New Pole" concept on 4 October 2017, both LMP and Momentum Movement had rejected the election cooperation with other parties.

On 23 June 2017, MP Zsuzsanna Szelényi announced that she resigned from her position in the party leadership and quit Together, after losing the election for the party leadership in February against Péter Juhász. She also disagreed with the new direction and method of politics, installed by Juhász and criticized the new president's guerrilla campaign methods and media PR campaigns and "ostentatious performances". She also said that she would retain her parliamentary mandate.

In January 2018, leaders of the party announced that Together will participate in the 2018 national election separately. Former president Viktor Szigetvári was nominated the party's candidate for the position of prime minister. The party failed to reach 5% electoral threshold, receiving 0.66 percent of the vote, albeit an individual candidate Szabolcs Szabó obtained a mandate, becoming his party's only MP. Subsequently, Szabó joined the LMP parliamentary group. According to the laws, Together had to repay the state aid of HUF 150 million to the state budget, as a result Juhász organized a fundraising campaign. The Together ceased to exist on 2 June 2018.

== Leadership ==
- Leader of the alliance: Gordon Bajnai (2012–2013)
- Co-presidency: Viktor Szigetvári, Péter Kónya and Péter Juhász (2013–2015)
- Viktor Szigetvári (2015–2017)
- Péter Juhász (2017–2018)

== Alliance ==
On 8 March 2013, the Dialogue for Hungary (PM) has established an electoral coalition with Together, which was formed as a political party. Benedek Jávor and Tímea Szabó, co-chairs of the green party also became members of Together's board. The two parties registered a joint national list for the 2014 European Parliament election too. Dialogue for Hungary broke off the permanent nature of alliance between the two parties on 9 November 2014. The two parties renewed their election cooperation for the 2018 national election on 4 October 2017. However, after PM politician Gergely Karácsony became the Socialist Party's prime minister-candidate too, Together terminated the cooperation agreement on 8 December 2017.

== Party's ideology ==
The party's ideology was social liberalism, liberalism and pro-Europeanism.

== Election results ==
For the Hungarian Parliament:

Election year	National Assembly				Government
Election year	# of overall votes	% of overall vote	# of overall seats won	+/–	Government
2014^{1}	Unity		3 / 199		in opposition
2018	37,561	0.66% (#8)	1 / 199	▼2	in opposition

For the European Parliament:

Election year	# of overall votes	% of overall vote	# of overall seats won	+/-
2014^{2}	168,076	7.25% (#5)	0 / 21	

^{1} In an electoral alliance with Dialogue for Hungary, Hungarian Socialist Party, Democratic Coalition and Hungarian Liberal Party.

^{2} In an electoral alliance with Dialogue for Hungary (PM). They gained one seat, PM politician Benedek Jávor.
