= Tibor Draskovics =

Hungarian politician

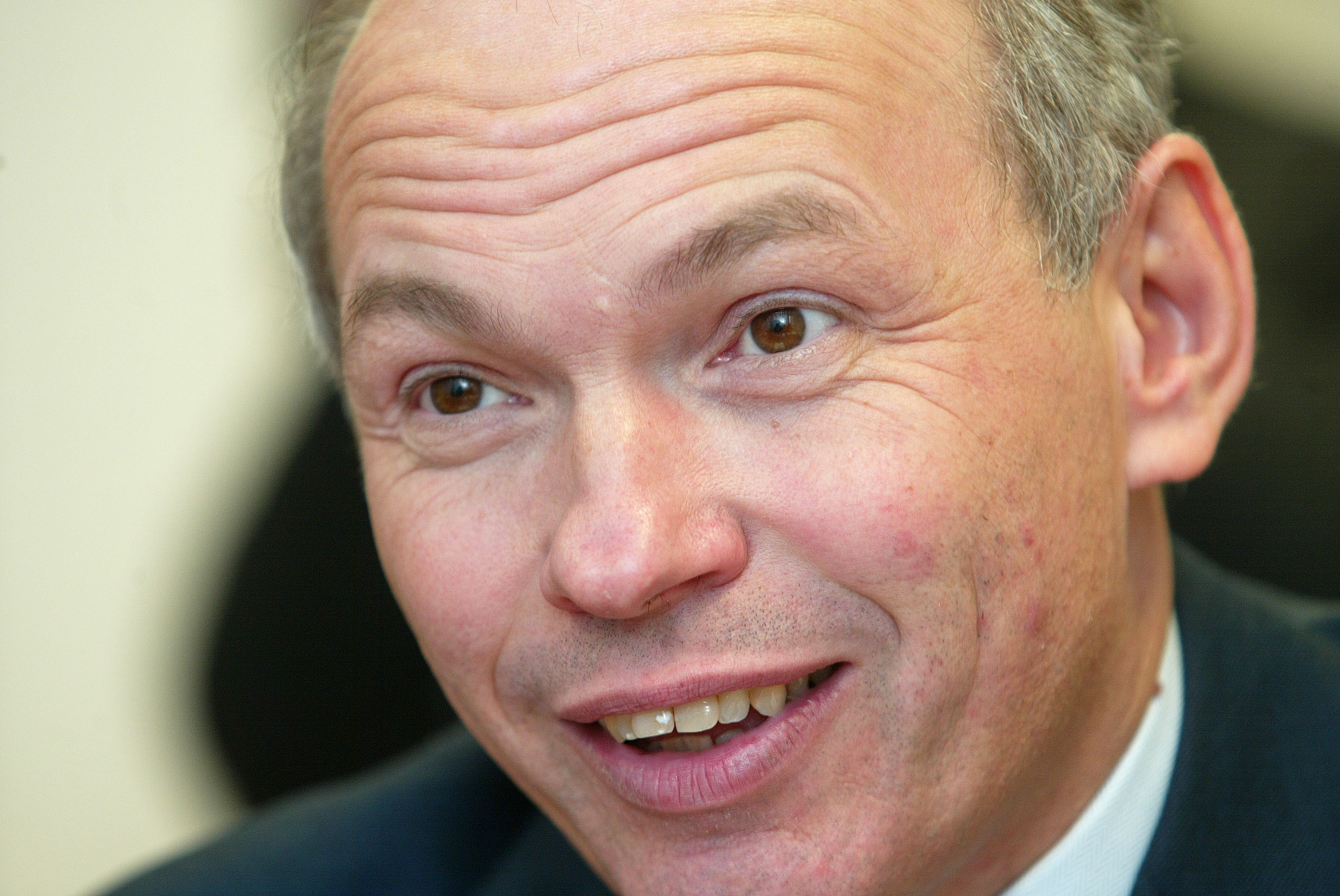
- Tibor Draskovics in 2004

Minister of Finance of Hungary
- In office 16 February 2004 – 24 April 2005
- Preceded by: Csaba László
- Succeeded by: János Veres

Personal details
- Born: 26 June 1955 (age 70); Budapest, People's Republic of Hungary
- Political party: Independent
- Children: 3
- Profession: politician, jurist

Tibor Draskovics (born 26 June 1955) is a Hungarian politician, who served as Minister of Finance between 2004 and 2005 and as Minister of Justice and Law Enforcement between 2008 and 2009. He was member of the Hungarian Olympic Committee from 1994 to 1998.

Political offices
Preceded by Csaba László	Minister of Finance; 2004–2005	Succeeded by János Veres
Preceded by Albert Takács	Minister of Justice and Law Enforcement; 2008–2009	Succeeded by Imre Forgács
