= Levente Pápa =

Hungarian economist and politician

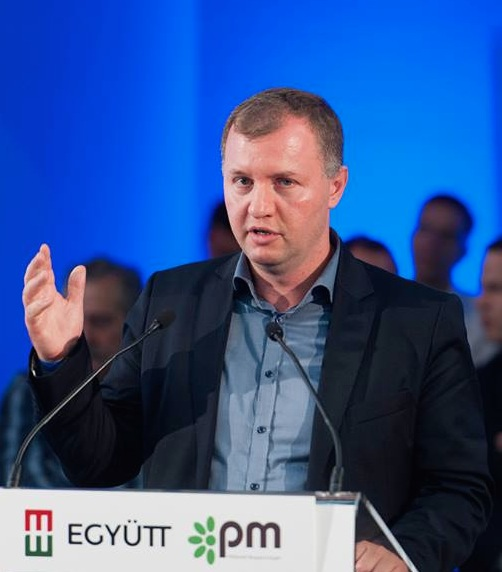

Personal details
- Born: 9 May 1975 (age 50); Tata, Hungary
- Political party: Together (2014–16)
- Education: Eötvös Loránd University; University of Economics of Budapest; Rajk László College for Advanced Studies
- Profession: politician, economist

Levente Pápa (born 9 May 1975 in Tata, Hungary) is a Hungarian economist and politician, former member and Chief Economist of Together party, board member between July 2014 and September 2016. Starting August 2014 he was also the Chair of the Board of the András Váradi Foundation.

== Education ==
Pápa acquired his secondary school leaving certificate in 1993 at the József Eötvös High School in Tata, specialized in natural sciences. He started his university studies on a Physics program at the Eötvös Loránd University of Sciences and changed later to the University of Economics of Budapest where he graduated with distinction from the Finance program as a Republic Scholarship recipient in 2004. In his university years, he was member of the Rajk László College for Advanced Studies from 1999 to 2004, also being a board member of the College for two years. Member of the Hungarian Association of Economists, he published papers titled Fiscal Sustainability in 2008 and Implications of Foreign Currency Exposure in 2012.

== Professional career ==
Upon graduation, Pápa became an analyst and portfolio manager for Argenta Zrt., where he was in charge of managing long-term investments in foreign capital markets. 2008–2010 he was CEO of Morrow Ltd. providing services related to foreign currency exchange risk in the real economy. Between 2010 and 2014, he was Chief Foreign Currency Strategist of OTP Bank providing regional-level investment advice and overseeing regional analytics. He left the bank to start his political career.

== Politics ==
Pápa arrived to Together from the One Million for the Freedom of Press Movement (Milla) in February 2014 to become the Chief Economist of the party. He held the 6th place on the national list of the party on the 2014 parliamentary elections. He was elected a board member of the party in July and Chair of the Board of the Together for Hungary Foundation. The Foundation was later renamed in remembrance to András Váradi Foundation, following the death of András Váradi, the party's member and mayor candidate in Alcsútdoboz. After unsuccessfully running as candidate for the party leadership against Viktor Szigetvári, he was elected a vice president of the party in February 2015.

Pápa left the party in September 2016. He argued the Together had gradually lost its independent character in comparison to the "old left-wing parties" (Hungarian Socialist Party and Democratic Coalition), and the Together also became part of Orbán's regime.

== Family ==
Pápa's father, Endre Pápa is a construction specialist, his mother Edit Stótz is a shoemaker, his sister Bernadett Pápa is a primary school teacher.

== Notes ==
- Official Facebook page
- Official Blog
