= János Veres =

Hungarian politician

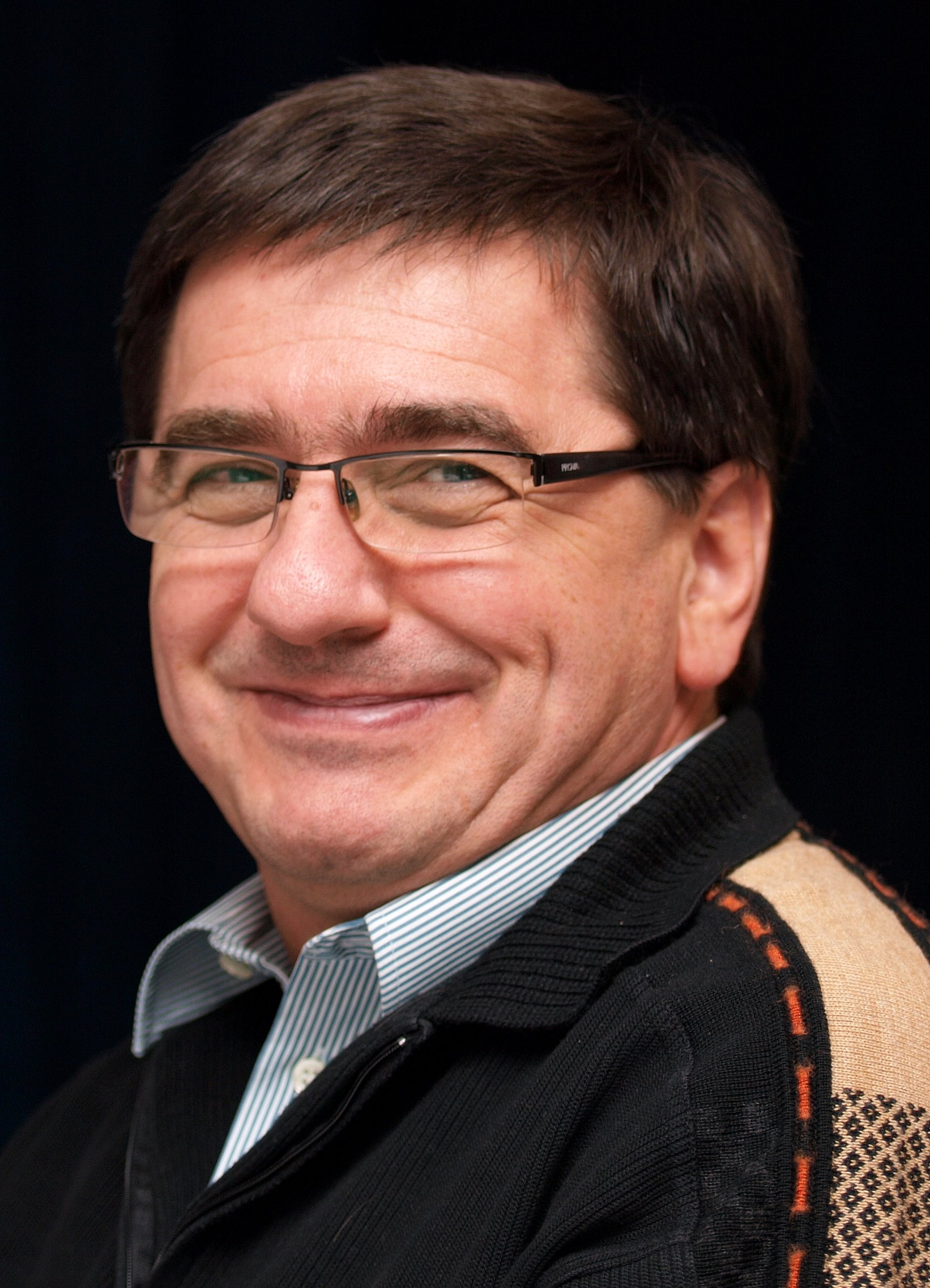

Minister of Finance of Hungary
- In office 25 April 2005 – 14 April 2009
- Preceded by: Tibor Draskovics
- Succeeded by: Péter Oszkó

Personal details
- Born: 5 February 1957 (age 68) Nyírbátor, People's Republic of Hungary
- Party: MSZMP, MSZP
- Spouse: Alexandra Dobolyi
- Children: 2
- Profession: politician, economist

János Veres (born 5 February 1957) is a Hungarian politician, who served as Minister of Finance between 2005 and 2009. He was a member of the Hungarian Socialist Workers' Party since 1980. He served as first secretary of the party's committee of Nyírbátor from 1988 to 1989. He was a founding member of the Hungarian Socialist Party (MSZP) in 1990. He became a member of the National Assembly of Hungary in 1994. He served as deputy chairman of the Committee of Economics many times. He also served as mayor of Nyírbátor since 2002, but resigned in the next year, because he was appointed state secretary of the Ministry of Finance. Veres became a member of the MSZP's presidency in 2004. Ferenc Gyurcsány appointed him Minister of Finance in 2005.

== Controversies ==
Veres had many conflicts with the HírTV, which supports the conservative right-wing politics and the biggest opposition party, Fidesz. On 19 December 2006 he head the reporter, who wanted to ask him. Two years later, in March 2008 he shoved away the correspondent deliberately. On the next day the two journalists appeared at the press conference in a visibility waistcoat. Then Veres declared that the HírTV's colleagues can't approach him. The minister repeatedly threatened the channel with a judicial lawsuit, when the reporters asked about his sons' charge.

Political offices
Preceded by Tibor Draskovics	Minister of Finance; 2005–2009	Succeeded by Péter Oszkó
