= Zsigmond Járai =

Hungarian politician

Minister of Finance of Hungary
- In office 8 July 1998 – 31 December 2000
- Preceded by: Péter Medgyessy
- Succeeded by: Mihály Varga

Personal details
- Born: 29 December 1951 (age 73) Biharkeresztes, People's Republic of Hungary
- Political party: Independent
- Profession: politician, economist

Zsigmond Járai (born 29 December 1951) is a Hungarian politician, who served as Minister of Finance between 1998 and 2000. He was the President of the Budapest Stock Exchange between 1996 and 1998. After his ministership he was appointed Governor of the Hungarian National Bank. Járai was succeeded by András Simor in 2007.

== Career ==
Járai was chairman of the supervisory board of CIG Pannónia Eletbiztosító Nyrt until he resigned from the position in 2013. He has also been chairman of the supervisory board of the Hungarian National Bank since 2010. In March 2022 Járai was elected as a member of the supervisory board of the MKB Bank.

== Interviews ==
- Zsigmond Járai: We need to improve competitiveness
- Zsigmond Járai: Will there ever be a Hungarian euro?
- Wall Street Journal: Zsigmond Járai, Hungary Fiscal Council

== Honours ==
- Honorary Knight Grand Cross of the Most Excellent Order of the British Empire

Political offices
Preceded by Péter Medgyessy	Minister of Finance; 1998–2000	Succeeded by Mihály Varga
Preceded by György Surányi	Governor of the Hungarian National Bank; 2001–2007	Succeeded by András Simor
