= Imre Forgács =

Hungarian politician (1949–2022)

Minister of Justice and Law Enforcement
- In office 14 December 2009 – 29 May 2010
- Preceded by: Tibor Draskovics
- Succeeded by: Tibor Navracsics (Minister of Administration and Justice)

Personal details
- Born: 9 April 1949; Budapest, Hungary
- Died: 26 October 2022 (aged 73)
- Political party: Independent
- Profession: Politician; jurist

Imre Forgács (9 April 1949 – 26 October 2022) was a Hungarian politician and jurist, who served as Minister of Justice and Law Enforcement between 2009 and 2010.

== Publications ==
- Neokonzervatív fordulat az Egyesült Államokban (1987)
- Az Európai Unió intézményi szemmel (1998)
- Európaizálódik-e a közigazgatás? (2008)
- Mégsem éjjeliőr? Az európai kormányzás esélyei és a pénzügyi válság (2009)

Political offices
Preceded by Tibor Draskovics	Minister of Justice and Law Enforcement; 2009–2010	Succeeded by Tibor Navracsics
