= András Simor =

Hungarian economist (born 1954)

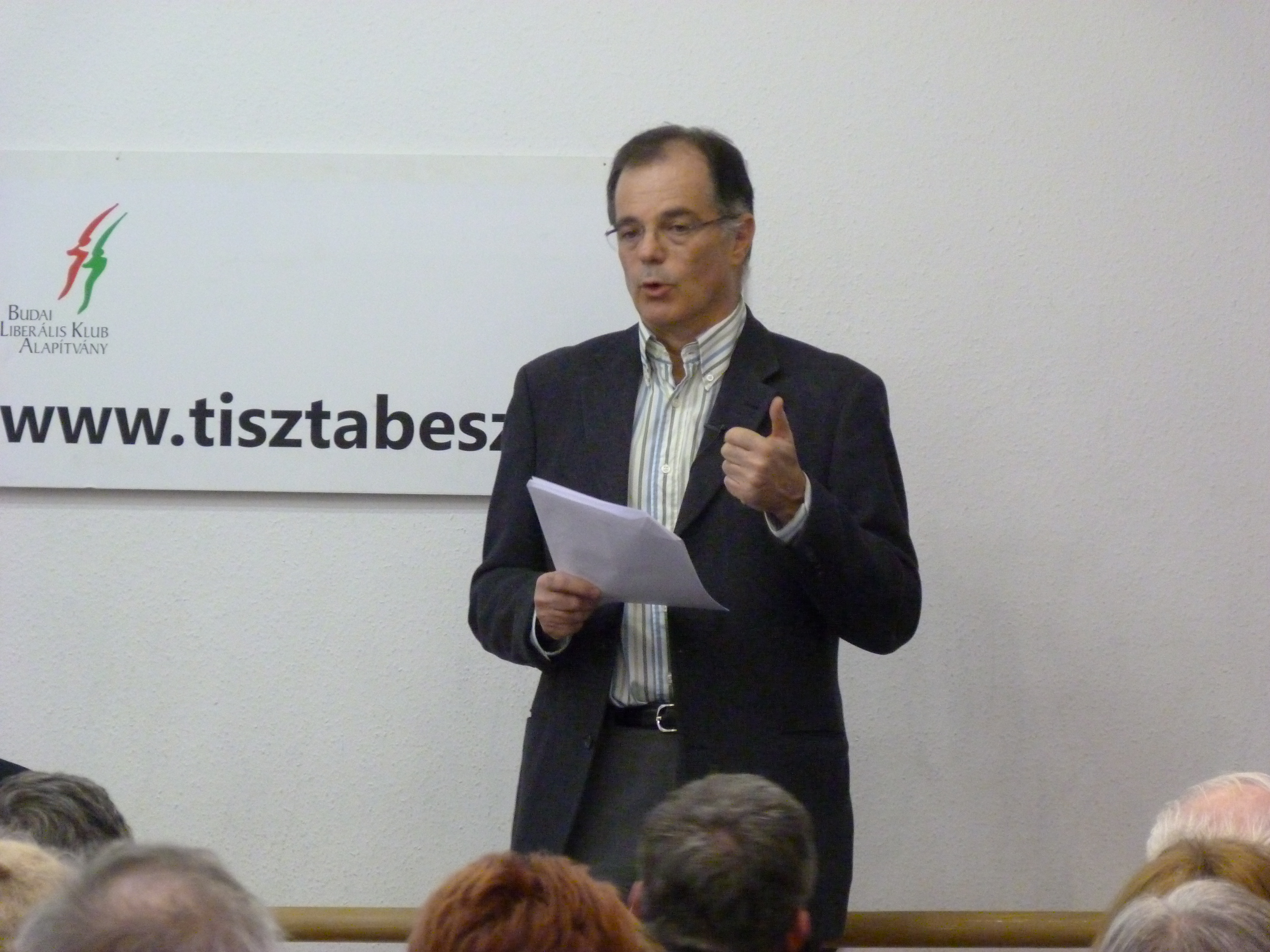
- András Simor at the Buda Liberal Club on 4 March 2013
- Born: 17 May 1954 (age 72); Budapest, Hungary
- Education: Corvinus University of Budapest
- Occupations: Chairman, President & CEO at Deloitte Touche Tohmatsu in Hungary
- Children: Máté; Diána; Dániel

András Simor (born 17 May 1954) is a Hungarian economist, who served as governor of the Hungarian National Bank (MNB) from 2007 to 2013. He was replaced by György Matolcsy.

== Career ==
He holds a degree in International Finances from the Budapest University of Economics.

He started his professional career as an executive at the MNB’s Foreign Exchange Management Department in 1976. Between 1979–1985, he worked at Hungarian International Bank Ltd, the MNB’s London-based subsidiary. Returning to Hungary, he was Deputy Head of the Bank’s International Division.

In 1989, he was appointed Chairman of the Board and President of the newly founded CA-BB, later Creditanstalt Értékpapír Rt. Under his management, one of Hungary’s first securities brokerage firms became a market leader. In 1997–98, he served as Executive Chairman of CAIB Investmentbank A.G. in Vienna, where he managed the merger of the investment businesses of Creditanstalt and Bank Austria, affecting eight countries.

Returning to Hungary, he served as Chairman of the Board of the Budapest Stock Exchange from 1998 to 2002. In this capacity, he made an important contribution to the transformation of the BSE from a public utility organisation into a profit-oriented corporation. He served his post at the Budapest Stock Exchange until 2002. From 1999, he was Chairman of Deloitte Hungary and then the firm’s Chairman and Office Managing Partner between 2000 and 2007. He was also member of the Board of Directors for Deloitte Central Europe. Under his management, the company became the second fastest-growing member of Deloitte Central Europe group. Simor was a member of the group’s regional board of directors between 2002 and 2006.

From 2007 to 2013 Simor was Governor of the National Bank for Hungary. In July 2013 he joined EBRD as Vice President, Policy. Then he became Chief Financial Officer in 2014. From November 2016 to May 2019 Simor was the EBRD´s Senior Vice President, Chief Financial Officer and Chief Operating Officer.

== Personal life ==
He is divorced and has three children from his marriage - one daughter, Diána and two sons, Máté and Dániel.

== Recognitions ==
- By Business Week Europe he was named as One of the top 50 Business Executives in Europe in 2001.
- According to Global Finance Magazine Simor was one of the best bank presidents in October 2009.
- The Euromoney journal was elected Banker of the Year in the emerging Europe region in 2010.

== See also ==
- National Bank of Hungary

Political offices
Preceded by Zsigmond Járai	Governor of the Hungarian National Bank; 2007–2013	Succeeded by György Matolcsy
