= Zsuzsanna Szelényi =

Hungarian politician (born 1966)

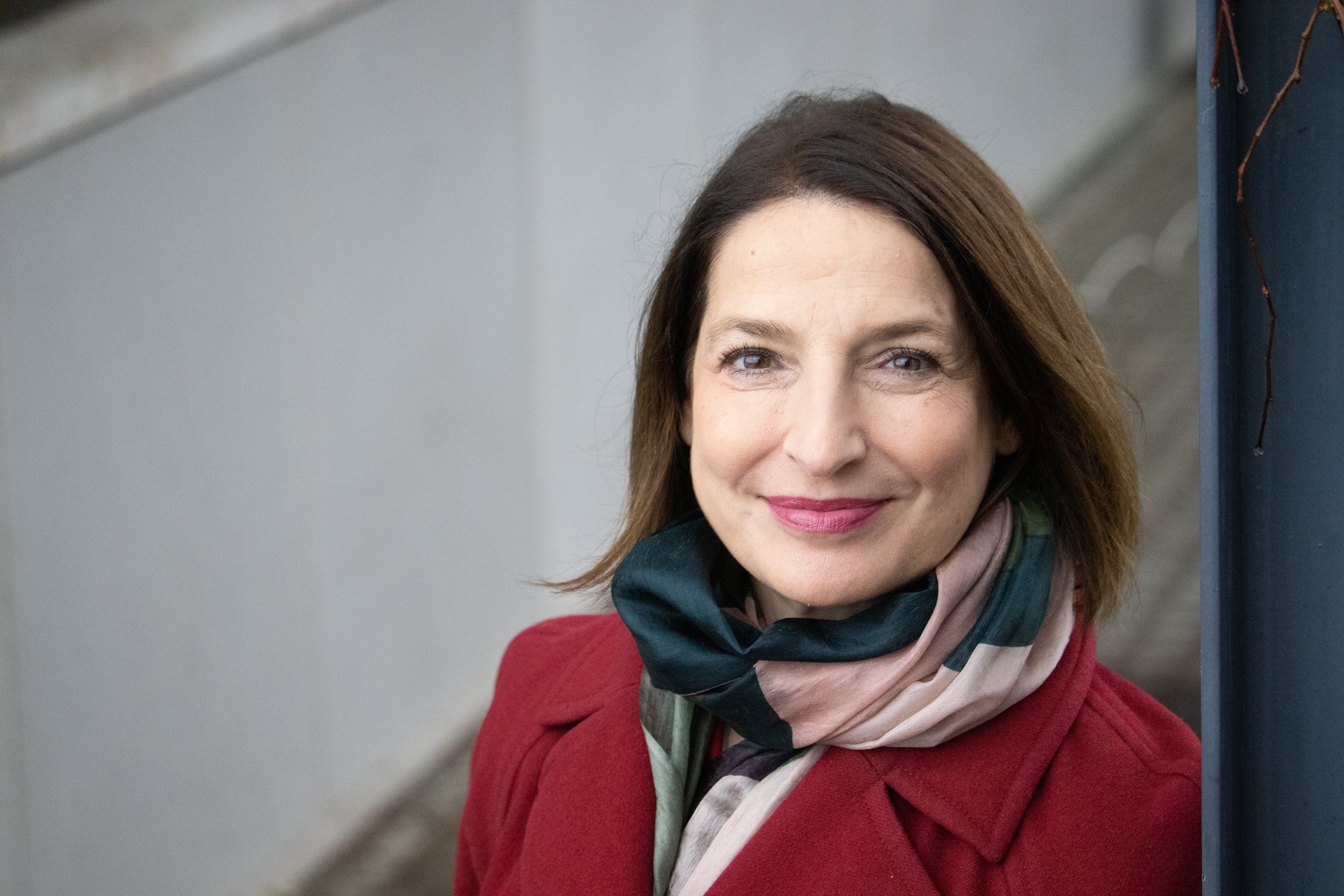

Member of the National Assembly
- In office 10 June 2014 – 7 May 2018
- In office 2 May 1990 – 27 June 1994

Personal details
- Born: 6 October 1966 (age 59) Veszprém, Hungary
- Party: Fidesz (1988–94); Together (2013–17)
- Spouse: Ferenc Karvalits
- Children: 3
- Profession: author, foreign policy expert, politician

Zsuzsanna Szelényi (born 6 October 1966) is a Hungarian author, politician, and foreign policy expert. She is the Director of the Democracy Institute Leadership Academy for Central and Eastern Europe. Her book 'Tainted Democracy, Viktor Orban and the Subversion of Hungary' was published in 2022. She served as Member of the Parliament (MP) from 1990 to 1994 (Fidesz) and from 2014 to 2018 (Together).

== Life ==
Szelényi was born in Veszprém and raised in Balatonalmádi. She earned an MA degree in psychology from the (ELTE Faculty of Social Sciences) and international studies at Corvinus University and at The Fletcher School of Law and Diplomacy in the US Global Master of Arts Program.

Her husband is Ferenc Karvalits, a former vice governor of the Hungarian National Bank. They have three children.

== Career ==
Zsuzsanna Szelényi joined Fidesz during the transition to democracy in 1988 and served on the party's board in the early days. She was elected Member of Parliament at 24 from her party's Veszprém County Regional List in 1990. Szelényi held membership positions in several national parliamentary committees: Education, Youth, and Sports Committee (1992), Social, Family, and Health Committee (1992–1994), and Committee on Foreign Affairs (1994). She was delegated to the Parliamentary Assembly of the Council of Europe. She left Fidesz in 1994 when the party changed its political position from liberal to conservative.

Szelényi served as Ministerial Commissioner in the Ministry of Education between 1994 and 1996. She worked for the Council of Europe from 1996 to 2010, as deputy director of the European Youth Centre Budapest advising governments and civil society organizations. From 2010 to 2012 she worked as an international development consultant in the Balkans and North Africa. She participated in the activities of several non-profit organizations, including the Active Citizenship Foundation, German Marshall Fund of the United States Marshall Memorial Fellowship, and the Hungarian Europe Society.

She co-founded the liberal Together party led by former PM Gordon Bajnai in March 2012. She ran in the 2014 parliamentary election for District II, Budapest, and became MP from the party's list. She served as a member of the Committee on Budgets from 2014 to 2018. She did extensive foreign policy work and built the Visegrad4Europe network among pro-European politicians and think tanks in Central and Eastern Europe.

In 2019 she was invited to be Europe's Future fellow at the Institut für die Wissenschaften vom Menschen in Vienna. In 2020 she was offered Richard von Weizsäcker Fellowship at the Robert Bosch Academy in Berlin.

In 2022 she took the position of founding director of the Democracy Institute Leadership Academy at the Central European University, Budapest campus.
