= Gordon Bajnai =

Hungarian politician

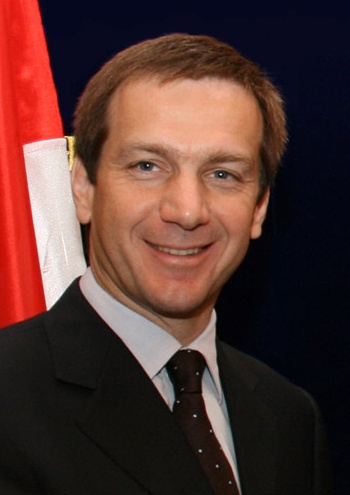
- Bajnai in 2009

Prime Minister of Hungary
- In office 14 April 2009 – 29 May 2010
- President: László Sólyom
- Preceded by: Ferenc Gyurcsány
- Succeeded by: Viktor Orbán

Minister of National Development and Economy
- In office 15 May 2008 – 16 April 2009
- Prime Minister: Ferenc Gyurcsány; Himself
- Preceded by: Csaba Kákosy
- Succeeded by: István Varga

Minister of Local Government and Regional Development
- In office 1 July 2007 – 14 May 2008
- Prime Minister: Ferenc Gyurcsány
- Preceded by: Mónika Lamperth
- Succeeded by: István Gyenesei

Member of the National Assembly
- In office 6 May 2014 – 26 May 2014

Personal details
- Born: György Gordon Bajnai; 5 March 1968 (age 58) Szeged, Hungary
- Party: Together (2013–2014)
- Spouse(s): Andrea Izsák (1st); Mónika Hajdú (2nd)
- Children: 4
- Education: Budapest University of Economic Sciences
- Occupation: Co-Chief Executive Officer of Lazard CL
- Profession: Economist

György Gordon Bajnai (Note: Hungarian pronunciation: [ˈɟørɟ ˈɡordon ˈbɒjnɒi]) (born 5 March 1968) is a Hungarian entrepreneur and economist, who served as the Prime Minister of Hungary from 2009 to 2010. Prior to that, he functioned as Minister of Local Government and Regional Development from 2007 to 2008, then as Minister of National Development and Economy from 2008 to 2009. In March 2009, following Prime Minister Ferenc Gyurcsány's announced resignation, Bajnai was nominated by the ruling Hungarian Socialist Party (MSZP) to become Hungary's next head of government. Bajnai became prime minister when the parliament passed a constructive motion of no-confidence against Ferenc Gyurcsány on 14 April 2009. He held the office until the formation of the Second Orbán Government following the 2010 parliamentary election.

Returning to politics, Bajnai established Together 2014, a coalition of left-wing and liberal political movements and civil organizations, in October 2012. The movement would have been an umbrella organization of centre-left parties to contrast Orbán's Fidesz in the 2014 parliamentary election with Bajnai as its prime minister-candidate, but negotiations have failed with the other opposition parties. Thereafter, the Together movement transformed itself into party on 8 March 2013, and Bajnai had gradually marginalized in the upcoming months. He retired from politics after the 2014 parliamentary and European Parliament elections.

== Studies and student politics ==
Bajnai was born in Szeged and raised in Baja, Hungary, the son of György László Bajnai and Ágota Sóvári. He finished his secondary studies at the local Béla III High School in 1986. He graduated from the Budapest University of Economic Sciences (now Corvinus University) International Relations Department in 1991. For his public and professional activities he was rewarded Pro Universitate Award.

Bajnai was very active in student-politics. In 1987, he organized a boycott of the University of Economics' canteen, and was the first chairman of the Independent Student Council. He was also the head of the History Department of Studium Generale, Admission Preparatory Studies College. In 1989, he, alongside András Schiffer, participated in the establishment of the short-lived New Generation Movement (ÚNM), founded and led by Ferenc Gyurcsány.

== Entrepreneurial career ==
After earning his master's degree, Bajnai took a job at Creditum Financial Consulting Ltd. In 1993, he undertook an internship at the European Bank for Reconstruction and Development in London. Later he also worked for Eurocorp International Finance Ltd.

Between 1995 and 2000, Bajnai was the managing director of CA IB Securities Co., and was the Deputy Chief Executive Officer (at the same time when András Simor, later head of National Bank of Hungary, was the head of the company). Bajnai was leading, among others the IPO's of Gedeon-Richter, MOL, OTP, Magyar Telekom, as well as some of the major M&A transactions of this period.

Between 2000 and 2005, he was CEO of Wallis Rt., an investment company. His duty was to restructure the holding-company, make it more efficient and to manage its investments. Wallis group member companies were at that time Graboplast Rt., Rába Rt., Elender Rt., Index.hu, WING, Wallis Auto Holding, Danubius Radio, Café Advertistment. In 2003, the National Association of Managers awarded Bajnai as the "Young Manager of the Year".

Among the more than 100 Wallis-owned companies a poultry processing firm, Hajdú-Bét went bankrupt during 2003, against all efforts by its management and owners. Many partners of Hajdú-Bét suffered serious losses during the time when the poultry market collapsed in 2003, Wallis group itself lost 10 billion forints (over 40 million Euros).

Years later, when he started his political career, Bajnai was criticized for the Hajdú-Bét collapse, although he won all the lawsuits against media-outlets for false accusations.

In 2005, he was Chairman of Budapest Airport (on behalf of BAA), and member of the Supervisory Committee at Zwack Inc. He was a member of the Corvinus University of Budapest Economic Council. He resigned all of his company posts and board-memberships, when he entered the government as government commissioner, responsible for EU funds and national development.

== Political career ==
=== Member of the Gyurcsány II Cabinet ===
Bajnai first received a government post in 2006. On 1 July, Prime Minister Ferenc Gyurcsány's called on him to be the Government Commissioner for Development Policy. In this position, he was overseeing the National Development Agency, that controls EU Funds to Hungary.

He became minister in July 2007, in the Ministry of Local Government and Regional Development. After SZDSZ left the coalition government, in May 2008, he took over the newly formed Ministry of National Development and Economy. During his period as Minister, Hungary has won the right to host the European Institute of Innovation and Technology, and at the same time Mercedes has concluded a major FDI with the Hungarian Government in Kecskemét. From October 2008, Bajnai's activities had mainly focused on managing the evolving crisis in the real economy in Hungary.

In March 2009, Prime Minister Ferenc Gyurcsány resigned, announcing that he would hand over his position to a new premier with a higher support of the parties of the Hungarian Parliament. The Alliance of Free Democrats (SZDSZ) opposed most candidates for the post proposed by the Hungarian Socialists. Although Bajnai was reluctant to give in, after a week, with no tangible results in sight, and being asked by the majority of party stakeholders, who also assured him of their support of the needed austerity measures, he took the job. Securing the backing of both parties, Bajnai became prime minister on 14 April 2009.

=== Prime minister ===
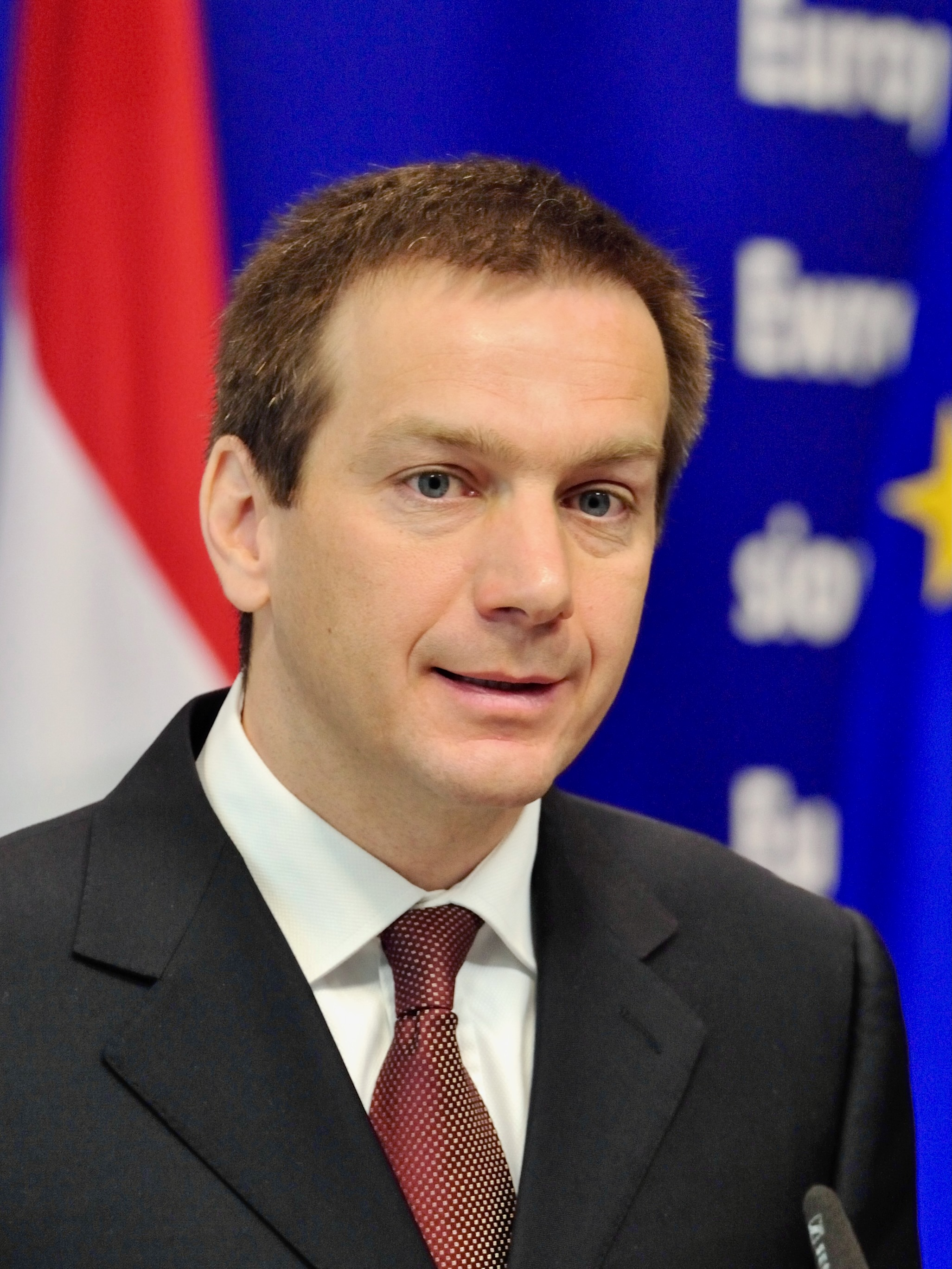
- Premiership of Gordon Bajnai; 14 April 2009 – 29 May 2010
- President: László Sólyom
- Cabinet: Bajnai government
- Party: Independent politician

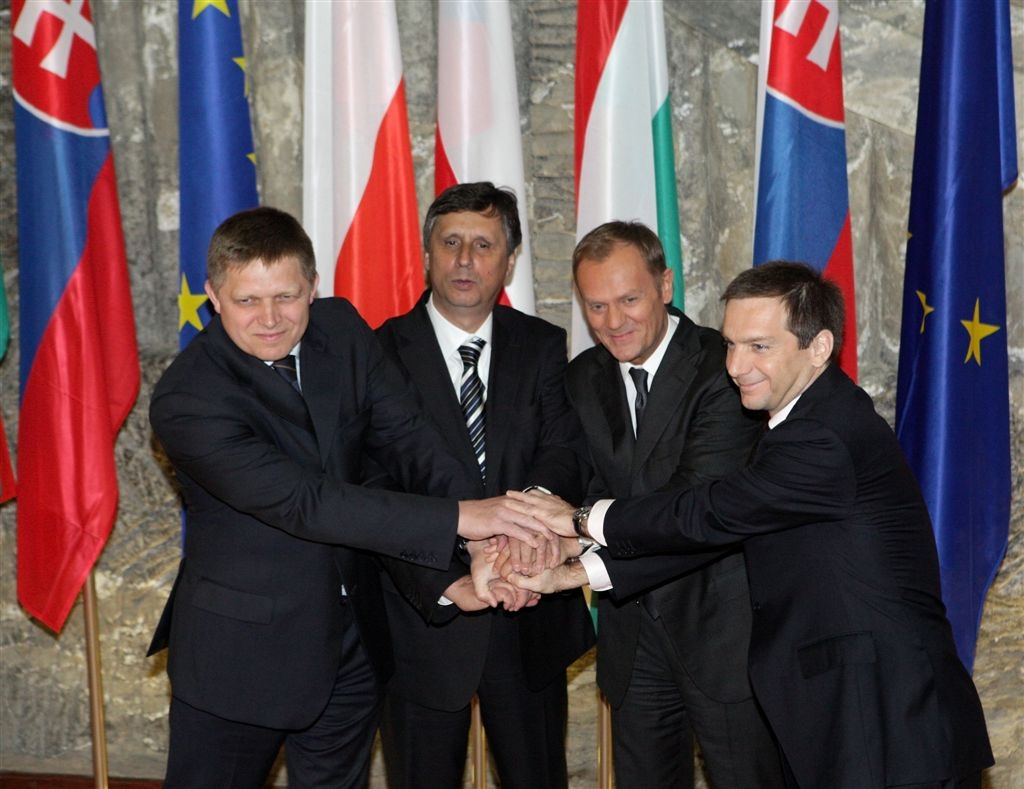
Bajnai meets with Czech prime minister Jan Fischer, Polish prime minister Donald Tusk and Slovak prime minister Robert Fico in Kraków on 3 June 2009.

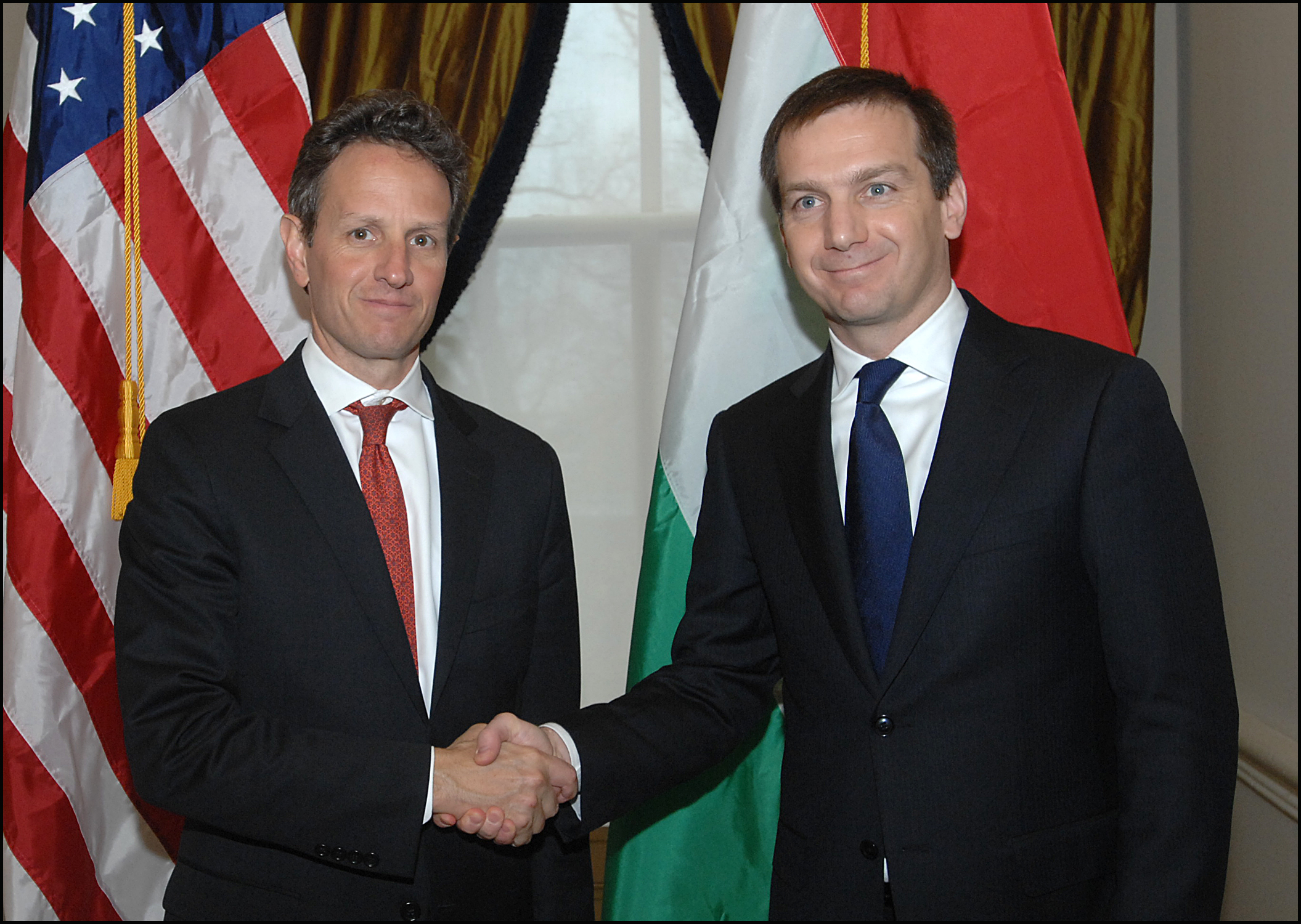
Bajnai met with U.S. Secretary Timothy Geithner on 4 December 2009.

The Hungarian Parliament elected Bajnai as Hungary's prime minister with 204 votes for, 8 abstentions. The remaining 174 MPs did not vote.

In his first speech as PM, he promised drastic measures to stop the negative spiral of the Hungarian economy, and to ease the burden of the international crisis. He also stated that he would remain in power until he had the solid majority of Parliament behind his austerity package, but will stay no longer than a year.

He did not want to nominate himself on the next election; he undertook the task for only a year. Attila Mesterházy became the Hungarian Socialist Party's candidate for the position. The MSZP suffered its worst result since the 1990 elections. The sixth National Assembly of Hungary formed on 14 May 2010. In accordance with the Constitution of Hungary Bajnai became "acting Prime Minister" for the following days. In his last speech he raised word against the Jobbik fearing for democracy given the party's radical views.

The new cabinet formed on 29 May 2010. Bajnai was succeeded by Viktor Orbán. After that he retired from politics and returned to business life.

==== Economic policy ====
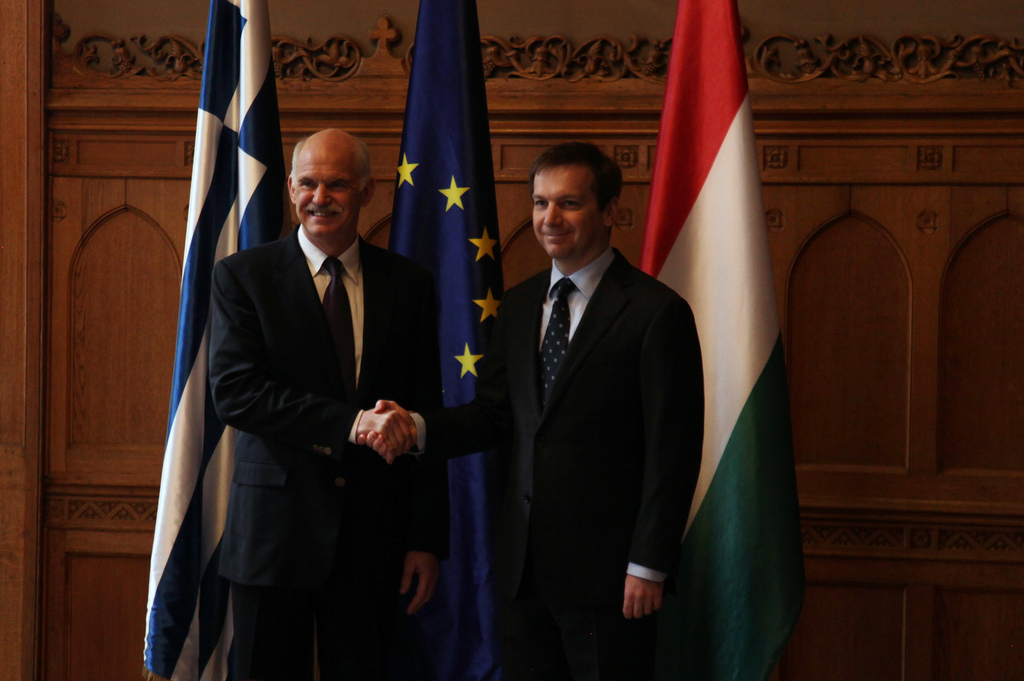
Greek PM George Papandreou with Bajnai in March 2010

Bajnai took over an economy that was expected to contract by 6 percent in 2009 and was kept afloat by a $25.1 billion IMF-led lifeline. Foreign investors were declining to finance Hungary's high budget and then current account deficits, and the forint's weakness threatened hundreds of thousands of families who took out foreign currency mortgages. Bajnai must have had to cut spending to rescue the budget, keep within IMF guidelines and regain investor confidence.

The Bajnai government had four main goals:

- Immediate crisis management (Activities: Stabilization of the financial system, Safeguarding jobs, supporting those who lose their jobs, Programmes to help the financing of SMS’s; Accelerating absorption of EU funds)
- Stimulating economic growth (Activities: Reforming the tax system; Extra-budgetary regulations; Extra-Measures to increase activity)
- Balancing the economy (Activities: Measures for the sustainable operation of the public sector; Improving the sustainability of the pension system; Creating a more targeted social system)
- Restoring Global trust (Activities: Restoring public order and confidence; Restoring confidence; Solidarity:state, politics, wealthy people; Anti-corruption measures; Helping pensioners; Providing continuous information to the public on Government activities; Establishing a national crisis Fund to help the most needy)

Handling the ruling Socialists might have been his most difficult task. He needed their votes but a sizeable section of the party viewed Bajnai with contempt because cuts in welfare spending was seen as eroding the party's traditional voter base. Despite this, Bajnai made a reform in taxes, pensions, public sector bonuses, maternity support, mortgage subsidies, energy subsidies and public transport subsidies.

Within six months, he managed to present a new budget that reduced government spending by five percent of GDP. Hungarian economic policy has regained its credibility, CDS-spread was less than one third of the level of a year before.

In an interview given to Handelsblatt, Bajnai said: “Most of the painful decisions were taken during the first 100 days of my government” (...)“It was clear what Hungary had to do, even if it was not easy politically. (…) This required painful adjustments from the people. Our challenge was keeping things bearable while simultaneously creating better conditions for stable and sustainable development. We have accomplished that goal.”

==== Foreign policy ====
His first visit abroad was in Brussels, where he debuted as Prime Minister. He had discussions with Jose Manuel Durao Barroso, President of the European Commission, and with Jaap de Hoop Scheffer, Secretary-General of NATO.

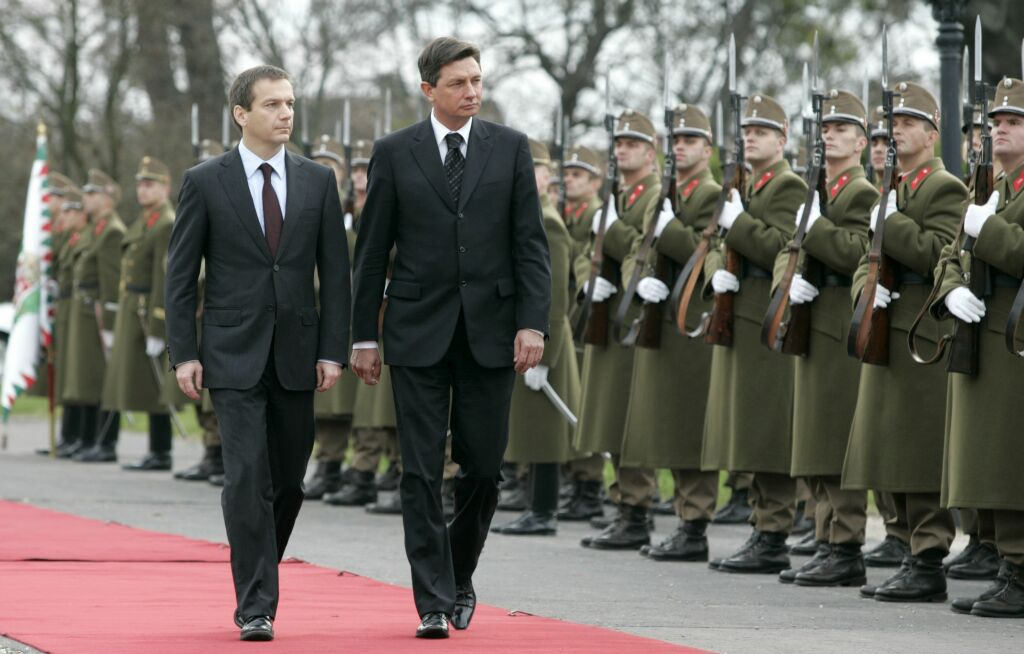
Slovenian PM Borut Pahor with Bajnai in November 2009

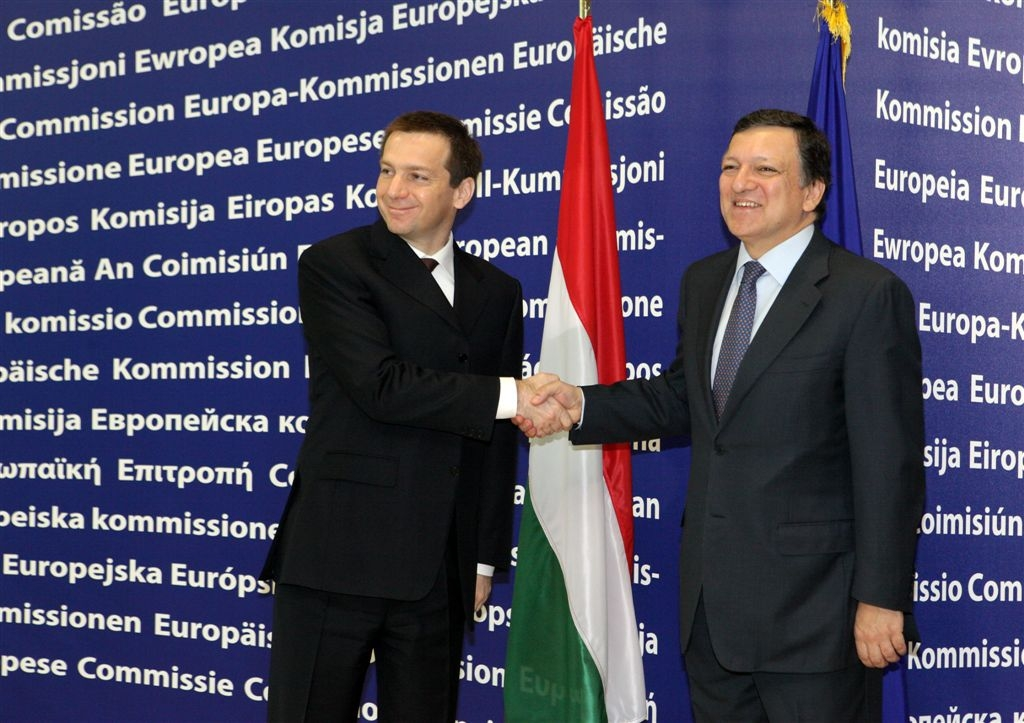
Gordon Bajnai with President of the European Commission José Manuel Barroso in Brussels

In April he met with Austrian PM Werner Faymann, in May, he attended the EU Partnership Summit in Prague. In May, he presented a speech on the Europe Forum, in Wachau, and in June, he attended the V4 summit in Kraków. He made a two-day official visit to Israel, where he met Shimon Peres, Benjamin Netanyahu and the Opposition Leader, Tzipi Livni. He also visited the Palestinian Authority, where he met the Palestinian prime minister, Salam Fayyad.

The Nabucco pipeline's intergovernmental agreement between Turkey, Romania, Bulgaria, Hungary and Austria was signed by five Prime Ministers (including Bajnai) on 13 July 2009 in Ankara.

On 19 August, he met with Angela Merkel, Chancellor of Germany, in Sopron. The event was the 20th anniversary of the Pan-European Picnic. In September he made a short official visit to Finland, where amongst others he met Prime Minister Matti Vanhanen.

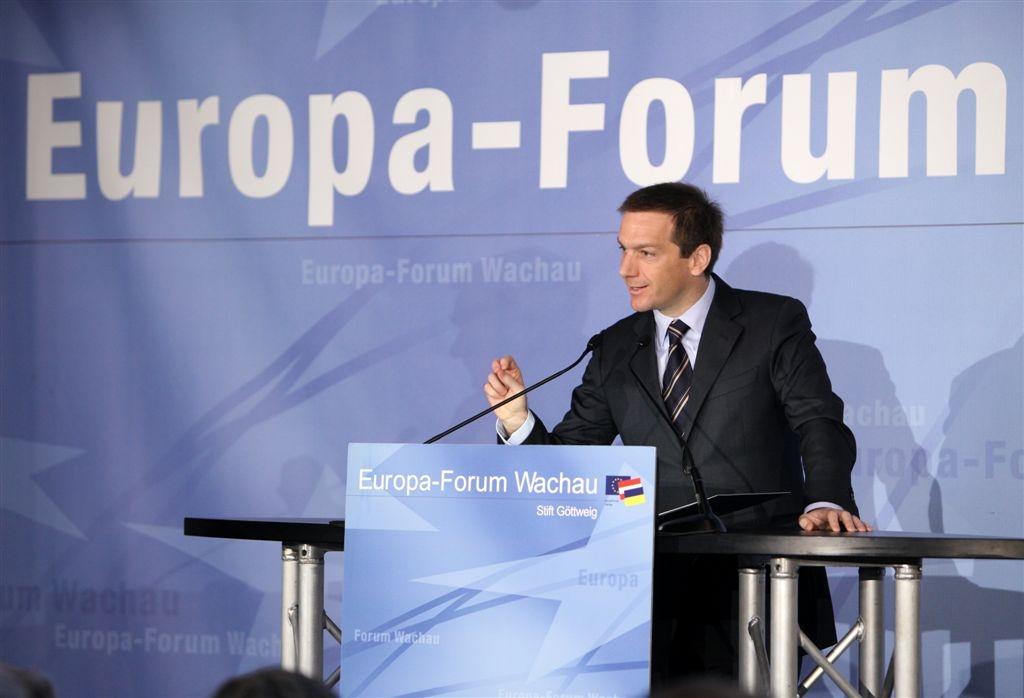
Gordon Bajnai presenting a speech in Wachau

On 10 September, he invited the Slovak PM Robert Fico to ease the tensions between Hungary and Slovakia. There were a clash of views between the two neighbors concerning the controversial amendment of the Slovak State Language Act. The two premiers expressed regret over the circumstances of a failed visit by President László Sólyom to Komárno on 21 August and agreed to accept all recommendations of the Organization for Security and Co-operation in Europe high commissioner on national minorities. Prime Ministers Gordon Bajnai of Hungary and Robert Fico of Slovakia signed a joint statement during their meeting in Szécsény.

Published on the Hungarian government spokesman's website, the statement declares the two countries' common interest in easing political tension. Bajnai and Fico agreed to direct the attention of all political parties to the social risks of confrontation, and called upon the citizens of both countries to show tolerance and understanding. They agreed to take resolute measures against extremist groups, and fight against all forms of xenophobia, intolerance, chauvinism, nationalism and violence, and the exportation thereof to one another's country. The two premiers declared that bilateral relations should be based on confidence, transparency and a pragmatic and constructive bilateral dialogue. They agreed to use all forms and instruments of cooperation, including further prime ministerial meetings.

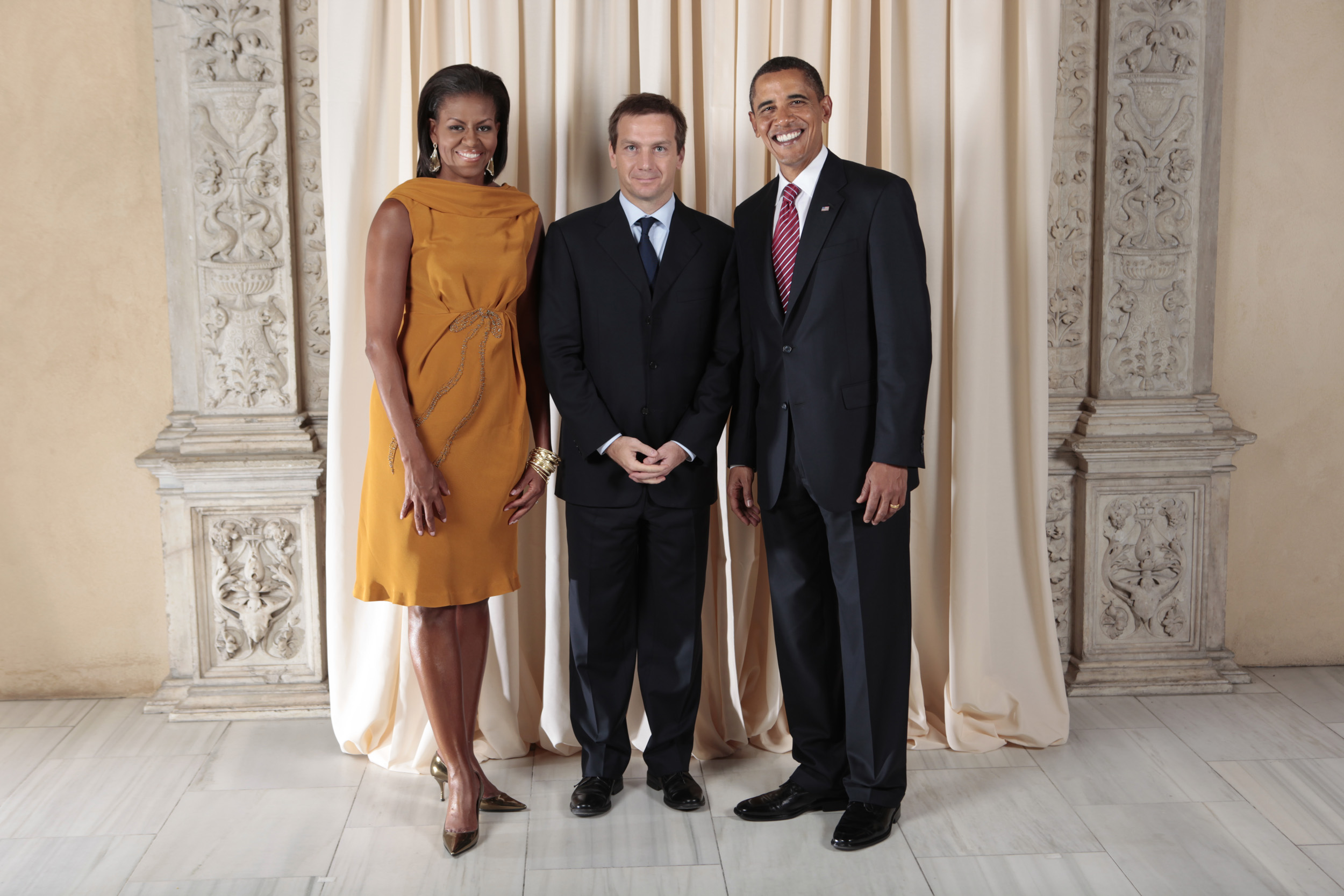
Bajnai with U.S. President Barack Obama and U.S. First Lady Michelle Obama

Between 20–24 September, Bajnai made an official visit to the USA, where he met President Barack Obama, the UN secretary-general Ban Ki-moon, he attended the Climate Conference of the UN. He visited The Wall Street Journal's editorial office. Amongst others he had discussions with George Soros, Charles Gati, and major U.S. financiers and investors, he closed the day's trading at the New York Stock Exchange.

In early October, Bajnai made a visit to the United Kingdom. He attended talks with Prime Minister of the United Kingdom Gordon Brown and gave a public lecture at the London School of Economics and Political Science. Between 18–19 October, he made a short official visit to Paris, where he met president of France Nicolas Sarkozy, PM François Fillon, and many French investors.

Hungary sent more troops to Afghanistan in line with then-current US strategy to enhance involvement there, Bajnai announced at a meeting with US Vice President Joe Biden in the White House on 4 December 2009. The pledge been made in several steps during 2010: Hungarian troops mainly serve in logistics and training operations, on top of helping to secure elections in Afghanistan, Bajnai told journalists after the talks.

At the beginning of 2010, Bajnai, as the Chairman of the Visegrád Four Grouping invited ten countries from the CEE region to sign a declaration for the support for stronger European energy policy cooperation and enhanced security of supply.

=== Together 2014 ===
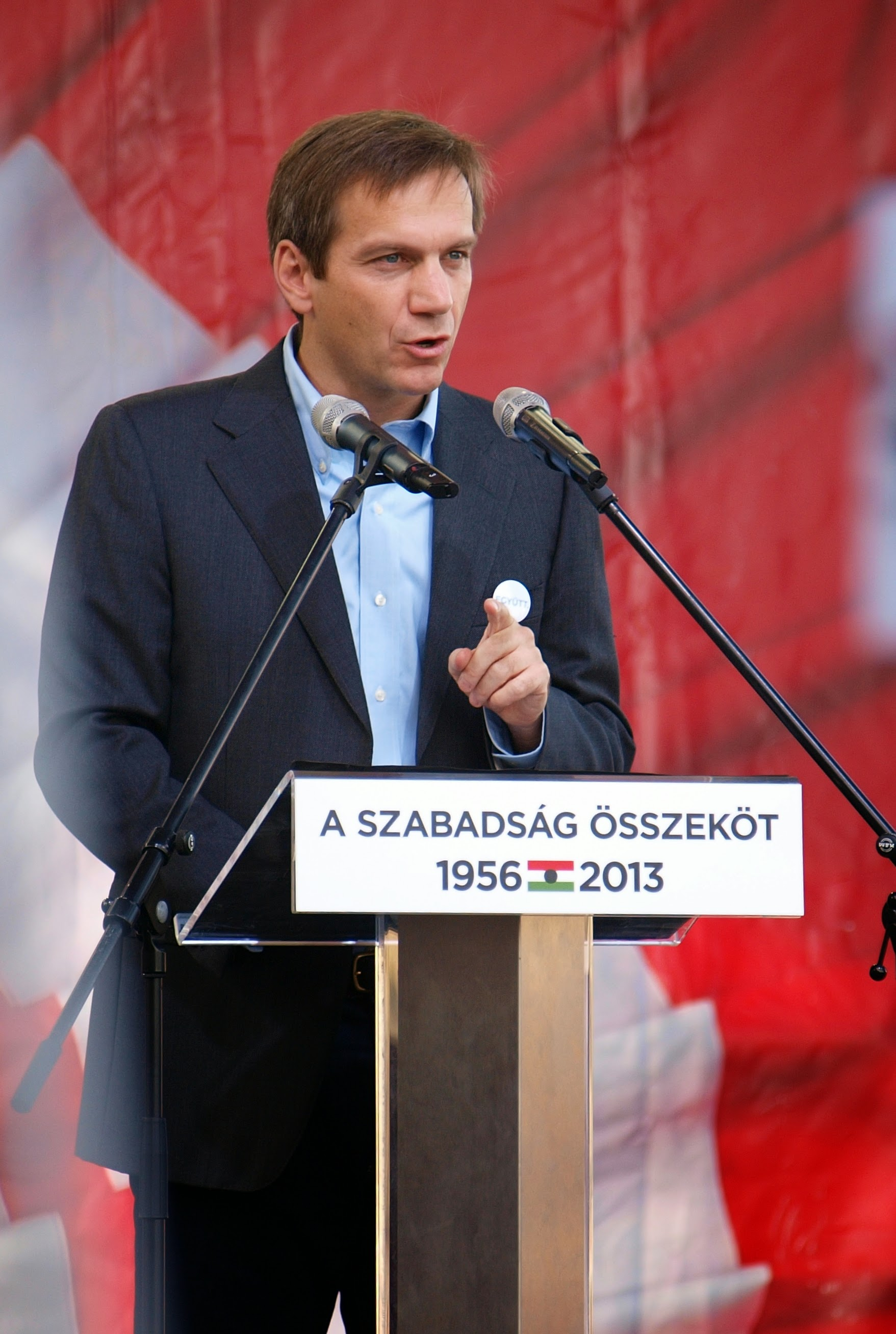
Gordon Bajnai giving a speech in October 2013

Several months after retiring from public service, he founded the Patriotism and Progress Public Policy Foundation with some of his former government members and independent experts, which states on its website that its goal is "to shape the world view and attitudes of our citizens to build a better Hungary". "To realize this dream we will actively pursue a progressive agenda by learning from best practice and empowering communities to better themselves. We will amass and tutor the expertise and know-how to assist Hungary in facing the many tests it has to pass on the road to modernization."

During the Autumn of 2011 he became adjunct professor at SIPA Columbia University in New York, and held lectures and speeches at Rutgers University in New Jersey, Johns Hopkins University in Washington D.C., Princeton University, Harvard University and the University of Pennsylvania.

Bajnai announced his return to politics on 23 October 2012, during the anti-government demonstration of the One Million for Press Freedom (Milla). On the protest, he called for an anti-Orbán coalition so as to form a supermajority in Parliament with the help of which the changes done by Orbán's ruling party, Fidesz could be undone.

In his speech, Gordon Bajnai repeatedly used a variant of the term ("We may fail on our own, but together, we shall prove victorious!"), when he proclaimed his support for such a "cooperation between hopeful left-wingers, disappointed rightwingers, politically abandoned free-thinkers and committed Greens" that his organization along with two other civilian body named Together 2014 (later simply known as "Together") as a reference to the date of the next general election in Hungary. In December 2012, Bajnai announced his intention to be a parliamentarian candidate in the 2014 general election.

On 14 January 2014, five opposition parties entered into an electoral coalition and formed Unity alliance. In order to facilitate the creation of this alliance, Bajnai voluntarily gave up his candidacy of Prime Ministership, in favor of Attila Mesterházy, the candidate of MSZP, the largest party of this coalition. Unity, under the leadership of Mesterházy suffered a heavy defeat in the April election, nevertheless Bajnai was elected to the National Assembly from the second place of the alliance's joint list. Bajnai resigned from his parliamentary seat on 26 May 2014, and gradually withdrawn himself from domestic politics.

From September 2014, Gordon Bajnai returned to his original profession when he was named Group Chief Operating Officer of the Paris-based Meridiam infrastructure, a leading global investment fund. Commentators on both the left and right political wing agreed that Bajnai was quitting politics with that step.

== Personal life ==
Bajnai is currently in his second marriage. He has four children: Zsófia (1995), András (1998), Ágnes (2008) and Miklós (2012).

Bajnai has played soccer from early childhood; he is one of the players of Hungarian football club Építők SK. Bajnai plays as a goalkeeper. According to the team's homepage the Prime Minister was the Footballer of the Year in 2001 at the club. In an occasion of a preparatory match against Grund FC in August 2011, he was seriously injured.

== Honors ==
In 1994 he was awarded Pro Universitate. In 1999 he was voted one of the 30 most promising Central-Eastern European business executives by the journal Central European Business Review. In 2003, the National Association of Managers selected Bajnai as the "Young Manager of the Year". 2006 Officer's Cross Order of Merit of the Republic of Hungary (Civic Order of Merit) as an acknowledgement for his exceptional professional and company management work and his achievements in the area of company management culture development.

== See also ==
- Cabinet of Gordon Bajnai

== Notes ==
Political offices
| Preceded by Mónika Lamperth | Minister of Local Government; 2007–2008 | Succeeded by István Gyenesei |
| Preceded by Csaba Kákosy | Minister of National Development and Economy; 2008–2009 | Succeeded by István Varga |
| Preceded by Ferenc Gyurcsány | Prime Minister of Hungary; 2009–2010 | Succeeded by Viktor Orbán |
