= Politics of Hungary =

Politics of Hungary Magyarország politikája
- Coat of arms of Hungary
- Polity type: Unitary parliamentary republic
- Constitution: Constitution of Hungary (2011)
- Formation: 23 October 1989 (Third Hungarian Republic) 1 January 2012 (current constitution entered into force)

Legislative branch
- Name: National Assembly
- Type: Unicameral
- Meeting place: Hungarian Parliament Building
- Presiding officer: Ágnes Forsthoffer, President of the National Assembly of Hungary
- Appointer: Partially parallel, partially compensatory voting: 106 FPTP seats, 93 PR seats with 5% electoral threshold (D'Hondt method)

Executive branch
- Head of state
- Title: President
- Currently: András Baka
- Appointer: National Assembly
- Head of government
- Title: Prime Minister
- Currently: Péter Magyar
- Appointer: National Assembly
- Cabinet
- Name: Government of Hungary
- Current cabinet: Magyar Government
- Leader: Péter Magyar, Prime Minister
- Appointer: National Assembly
- Ministries: 16

Judicial branch
- Constitutional Court of Hungary
- Chief judge: Péter Polt
- Seat: 1015 Budapest, Donáti utca, 35-45
- Curia of Hungary
- Chief judge: Zsolt András Varga
- Seat: 1055 Budapest, Markó utca 16

The politics of Hungary take place in a framework of a parliamentary representative democratic republic. The prime minister is the head of government of a pluriform multi-party system, while the president is the head of state and holds a largely ceremonial position. Since 2024, the country has been considered "no longer a full democracy" by the European Parliament and is generally said to have democratically backslid since 2010, when the Fidesz–KDNP Party Alliance led by Viktor Orbán won a two-thirds parliamentary supermajority and adopted a new constitution of Hungary. However, the victory of Péter Magyar in the 2026 Hungarian parliamentary election may bring about changes, as he promised to restore the order of democracy.

Executive power is exercised by the government. Legislative power is vested in both the government and the parliament. Until the last election in 2026, the party system had been dominated by the conservative Fidesz. The three larger oppositions were Democratic Coalition (DK), Momentum and Jobbik; there were also opposition parties with a small fraction in parliament (e.g. Politics Can Be Different). The judiciary is independent of the executive and the legislature.

Hungary is an independent state which has been a parliamentary republic since 1989 and a member of the European Union since 2004. Legislative power is exercised by the unicameral National Assembly that consists of 199 members, who are elected for four-year terms.

In the April 2026 election, Péter Magyar's Tisza Party won a two-thirds supermajority in parliament, decisively beating Orbán's incumbent Fidesz–KDNP party. Magyar became prime minister on 9 May 2026.

== Executive branch ==
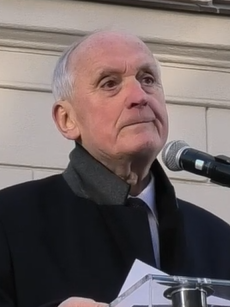
András Baka,
President since 2026

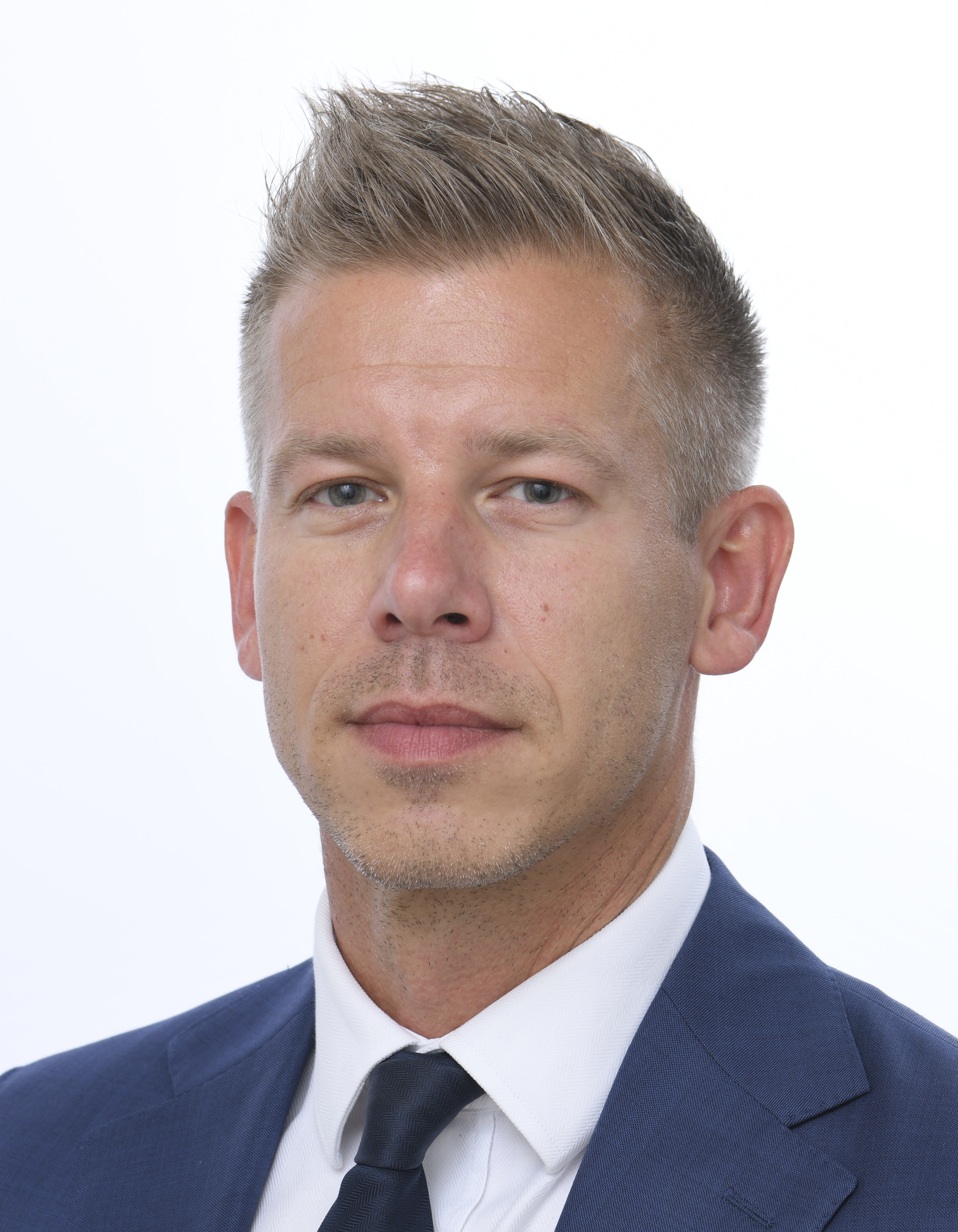
Péter Magyar,
Prime Minister since 2026

Main office-holders
Office	Name	Party	Since
President	András Baka	Independent	19 Aug 2026
Prime Minister	Péter Magyar	Tisza Party	9 May 2026

The president of the republic, elected by the National Assembly every five years, has a largely ceremonial role, but he is nominally the commander-in-chief of the armed forces and his powers include the nomination of the prime minister, who is to be elected by a majority of the votes of the members of Parliament, based on the recommendation made by the president of the republic. If the president dies, resigns or is otherwise unable to carry out his duties, the speaker of the National Assembly becomes acting president.

Due to the Hungarian Constitution, based on the post-World War II Basic Law of the Federal Republic of Germany, the prime minister has a leading role in the executive branch as he selects Cabinet ministers and has the exclusive right to dismiss them (similarly to the competences of the German federal chancellor). Each cabinet nominee appears before one or more parliamentary committees in consultative open hearings, survive a vote by the Parliament and must be formally approved by the president.

The laws were once decided by the Diet of Hungary but are now decided by the National Assembly.

In Communist Hungary, the executive branch of the government was represented by the Council of Ministers.

== Legislative branch ==
Main office-holders
Office	Name	Party	Since
Speaker of the National Assembly	Ágnes Forsthoffer	Tisza Party	9 May 2026

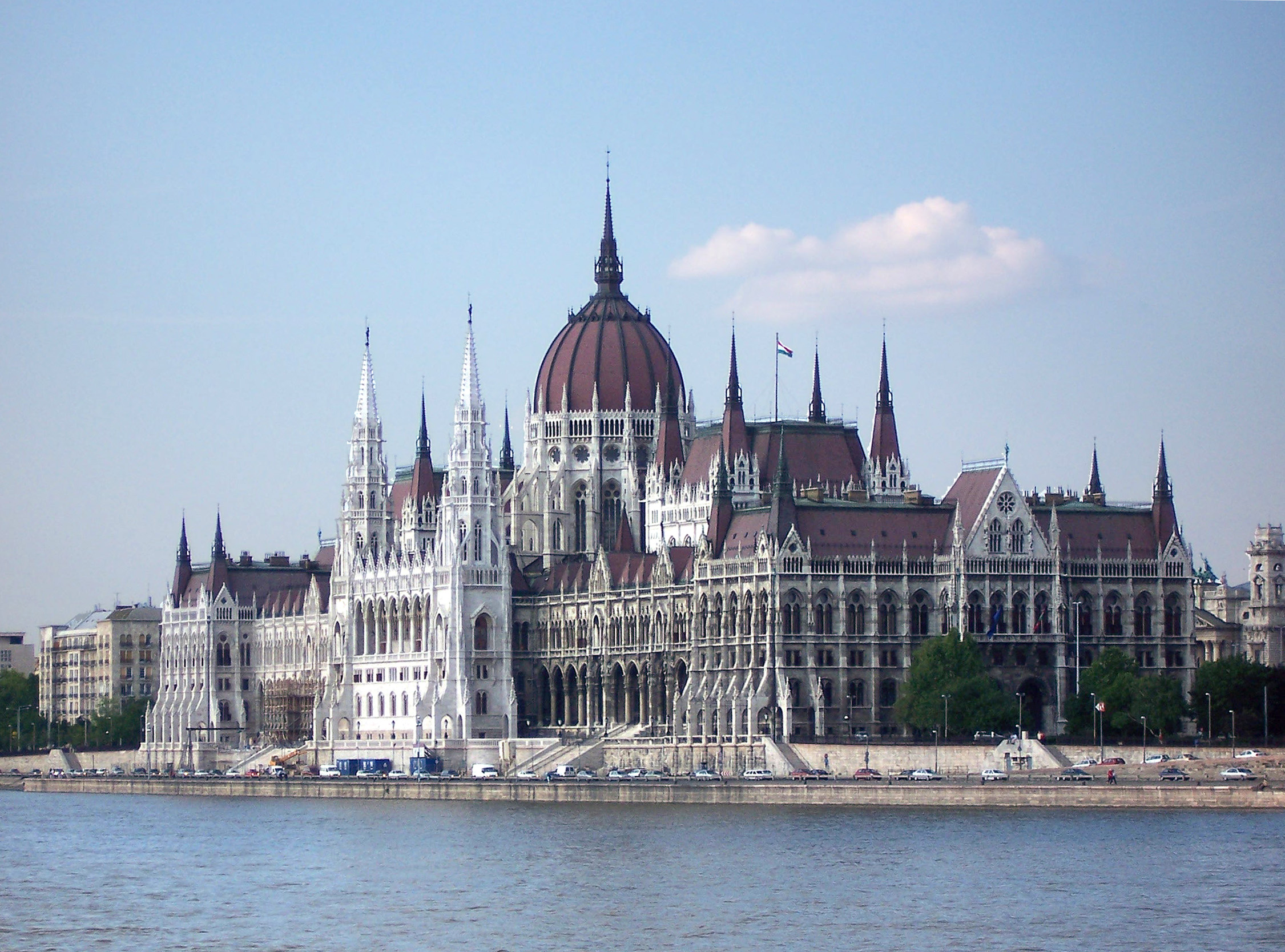
Parliament of Hungary

The unicameral, 199-member National Assembly (Országgyűlés) is the highest organ of state authority and initiates and approves legislation sponsored by the prime minister. Its members are elected for a four-year term. The election threshold is 5%, but it only applies to the multi-seat constituencies and the compensation seats, not the single-seat constituencies.

== Political parties and elections ==
Party	Party-list			Constituency			Total seats	+/–
Party	Votes	%	Seats	Votes	%	Seats	Total seats	+/–
Tisza Party	3,385,890	53.18	45	3,333,415	55.26	96	141	New
Fidesz–KDNP	2,458,337	38.61	42	2,215,225	36.72	10	52	–83
Our Homeland Movement	358,372	5.63	6	345,252	5.72	0	6	0
Democratic Coalition	70,298	1.10	0	65,302	1.08	0	0	–15
Hungarian Two Tailed Dog Party	51,965	0.82	0	38,924	0.65	0	0	0
National Roma Self-Government	19,203	0.30	0				0	0
National Self-Government of Germans	18,419	0.29	0				0	–1
National Self-Government of Croats	1,307	0.02	0				0	0
National Self-Government of Slovaks	902	0.01	0				0	0
National Self-Government of Romanians	512	0.01	0				0	0
National Self-Government of Rusyns	440	0.01	0				0	0
National Self-Government of Ukrainians	379	0.01	0				0	0
National Self-Government of Slovenes	179	0.00	0				0	0
National Self-Government of Greeks	159	0.00	0				0	0
National Self-Government of Poles	147	0.00	0				0	0
National Self-Government of Armenians	116	0.00	0				0	0
National Self-Government of Bulgarians	108	0.00	0				0	0
Jobbik				7,832	0.13	0	0	–7
Hungarian Workers' Party–Solidarity Party				4,187	0.07	0	0	0
Party of Normal Life				328	0.01	0	0	0
National Unification Movement				249	0.00	0	0	0
Party of the Centre				247	0.00	0	0	0
Hungarian Justice and Life Party (Note: The party, despite its name, is not similar to the defunct Hungarian Justice and Life Party.)				196	0.00	0	0	0
LMP – Hungary's Green Party				163	0.00	0	0	–3
Direction – The Future Party				109	0.00	0	0	0
Independents				20,967	0.35	0	0	0
Total	6,366,733	100.00	93	6,032,396	100.00	106	199	0
Valid votes	6,366,733	99.41		6,032,396	99.43			
Invalid/blank votes	37,670	0.59		34,327	0.57			
Total votes	6,404,403	100.00		6,066,723	100.00			
Registered voters/turnout	8,112,646	78.94		7,618,472	79.63			
Source: Nemzeti Választási Iroda

Party vote share
TISZA	53.18%
Fidesz–KDNP	38.61%
MHM	5.63%
DK	1.10%
MKKP	0.82%
Minorities	0.66%

Constituency vote share
TISZA	55.26%
Fidesz–KDNP	36.72%
MHM	5.72%
DK	1.08%
MKKP	0.65%
Others	0.57%

Seat share
TISZA	70.85%
Fidesz–KDNP	26.13%
MHM	3.02%

The 2026 election brought dramatic changes to Hungary's politics. Respect and Freedom Party (Tisza party), which was in its current form established in 2024 (Note: The party was originally founded in 2020. After Péter Magyar announced his entry into politics in March 2024, he joined the previously unknown and small Tisza Party, because the time left until the 2024 European Parliament election was too short for a new party to be registered. The original members of TISZA have left the party.), defeated the Fidesz–KDNP coalition, who had been governing for 16 years and who have won every election since 2010 with a two-thirds majority (such a supermajority is needed to enact constitutional amendments and cardinal laws). This shift in power has been variously described as a change of regimes, or a voters' revolution.

The election also brought drastic changes to Fidesz's previous opposition. Out of the 6 parties whose coalition was the main opposition force in 2022, 5 decided to step back from election in 2026 in favour of Tisza. Only DK ran, but they only received 1% of the party list votes, while 5% is needed to get into the legislature. The Hungarian Two-Tailed Dog Party, a party that was originally a joke party, not only failed to get in, but even failed to get 1% of party list votes, which means they have to pay back all 686 million HUF (more than 2 million USD) campaign support they received from the state.

The only party to get into the National Assembly other than Tisza and Fidesz-KDNP is the far-right Our Homeland Movement.

== Judicial branches ==
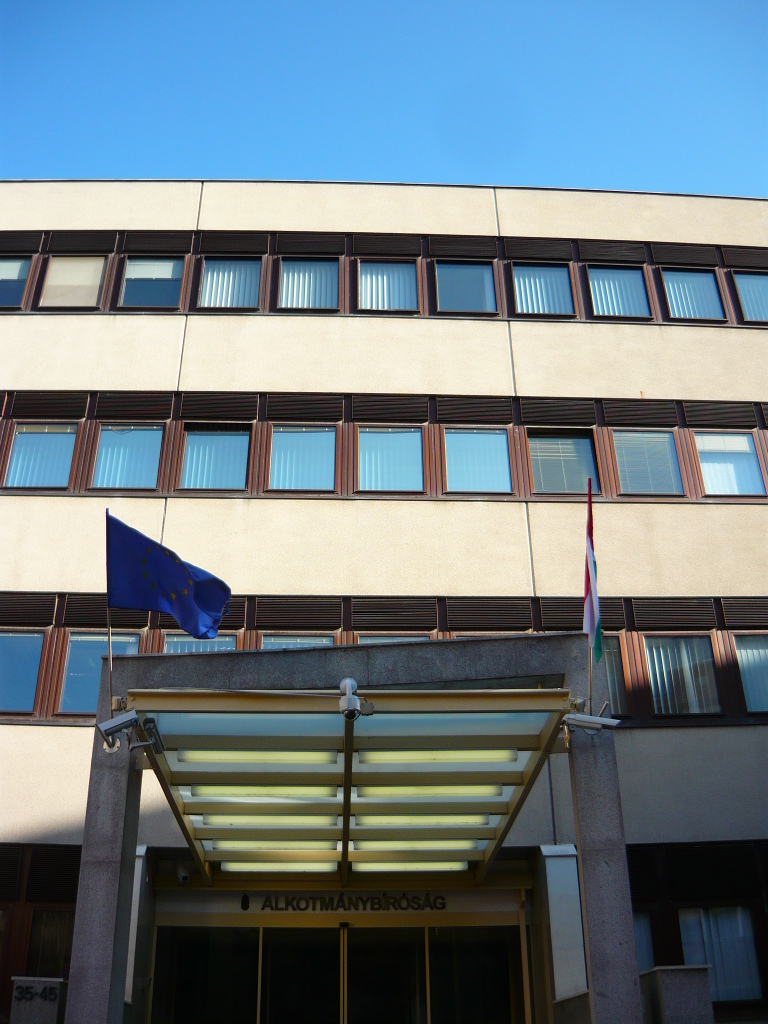
Constitutional Court of Hungary

A fifteen-member Constitutional Court has power to challenge legislation on grounds of unconstitutionality. This body was last filled in July 2010. Members are elected for a term of twelve years. Critics of the ruling coalition contend that since the Hungarian government filled the Constitutional Court with loyal judges, the institution mostly serves to legitimize government interests and has lost its original purpose as democratic defender of the rule of law and of human rights - as several reports of independent human rights NGOs, such as the Hungarian Helsinki Committee emphasize.

The president of the Supreme Court of Hungary (Curia) and the Hungarian civil and penal legal system he leads is fully independent of the Executive Branch.

The attorney general or chief prosecutor of Hungary is currently fully independent of the executive branch, but his status is actively debated.

Several ombudsman offices exist in Hungary to protect civil, minority, educational and ecological rights in non-judicial matters. They have held the authority to issue legally binding decisions since late 2003.

== Financial branch ==
The central bank, the Hungarian National Bank was fully self-governing between 1990 and 2004, but new legislation gave certain appointment rights to the executive branch in November 2004 which is disputed before the Constitutional Court.

== Administrative divisions ==
Hungary is divided into 19 counties (vármegyék, singular: vármegye), and a capital city (főváros). Counties have been called megye from 1949 until 1 January 2023, when a controversial constitutional amendment took effect reverting to the original historical terminology (Note: At the same time, the title of county-level government officials was changed from kormánymegbízott to főispán, a term associated with feudal society.). However, due to another amendment enacted by the Magyar Government, starting from 1 October 2026, the terminology will be reversed to megye.

The counties: Bács-Kiskun, Baranya, Békés, Borsod-Abaúj-Zemplén, Csongrád-Csanád, Fejér, Győr-Moson-Sopron, Hajdú-Bihar, Heves, Jász-Nagykun-Szolnok, Komárom-Esztergom, Nógrád, Pest, Somogy, Szabolcs-Szatmár-Bereg, Tolna, Vas, Veszprém, Zala. Budapest is not part of a county.

Two, less often used divisions are districts (járások, singular: járás), which compose counties, and regions (régiók, singular: régió), which are composed of one or more counties.

The area of Hungary is also divided into 3155 municipalities (települések, singular: település). Out of this, there are 348 cities and 2807 villages.

== Involvement in international organisations ==
Hungary is a member of the ABEDA, Australia Group, BIS, CE, CEI, CERN, CEPI EAPC, EBRD, ECE, EU, FAO, IAEA, IBRD, ICAO, ICC, ICRM, IDA, IEA, IFC, IFRCS, ILO, IMF, IMO, Inmarsat, Intelsat, Interpol, IOC, IOM, ISO, ITU, ITUC, NAM (guest), NATO, NEA, NSG, OAS (observer), OECD, OPCW, OSCE, PCA, SECI, UN, UNCTAD, UNESCO, UNFICYP, UNHCR, UNIDO, UNIKOM, UNMIBH, UNMIK, UNOMIG, UN Tourism, UNU, UPU, Visegrád Group, WCO, WFTU, WHO, WIPO, WMO, WTO, and Zangger Committee.

== Reversal of ICC withdrawal ==
In May 2026, the newly elected government of Prime Minister Péter Magyar reversed Hungary's planned withdrawal from the International Criminal Court (ICC). On 27 May 2026, the National Assembly voted to remain a member, overturning a decision made by the previous Orbán government. Prime Minister Magyar stated that Hungary would now be obliged to arrest Israeli Prime Minister Benjamin Netanyahu, who is subject to an ICC arrest warrant, if he enters Hungarian territory.

== Ministries ==
Ministries of Hungary
English name	Hungarian name	Minister
Ministry of Health	Egészségügyi Minisztérium	Zsolt Hegedűs
Ministry of Justice	Igazságügyi Minisztérium	Márta Görög
Ministry of Education and Children	Oktatási és Gyermekügyi Minisztérium	Judit Lannert
Ministry of Finance	Pénzügyminisztérium	András Kármán
Ministry of Agriculture and Food Economy	Agrár- és Élelmiszergazdaságért Felelős Minisztérium	Szabolcs Bóna
Ministry of the Interior	Belügyminisztérium	Gábor Pósfai
Ministry for the Living Environment	Élő Környezetért Felelős Minisztérium	László Gajdos
Ministry of Economy and Energy	Gazdasági és Energetikai Minisztérium	István Kapitány
Ministry of Defence	Honvédelmi Minisztérium	Romulusz Ruszin-Szendi
Ministry of Transport and Public Investments	Közlekedési és Beruházási Minisztérium	Dávid Vitézy
Ministry of Foreign Affairs	Külügyminisztérium	Anita Orbán
Prime Minister's Office	Miniszterelnökség	Bálint Ruff
Ministry of Social and Family Affairs	Szociális és Családügyi Minisztérium	Vilmos Kátai-Németh
Ministry for Community Relations and Culture	Társadalmi Kapcsolatokért és Kultúráért Felelős Minisztérium	Zoltán Tarr
Ministry of Science and Technology	Tudományos és Technológiai Minisztérium	Zoltán Tanács
Ministry for Rural and Settlement Development	Vidék- és Településfejlesztési Minisztérium	Viktória Lőrincz
