= List of international prime ministerial trips made by Péter Magyar =

This is a list of international prime ministerial trips made by Péter Magyar, who is serving as the 60th and current prime minister of Hungary since 9 May 2026.

== Summary ==
Magyar has visited five countries during his tenure as prime minister. The number of visits per country where Magyar has traveled are:

- One visit to Austria, France, Germany, Poland, Slovenia, Slovakia, Turkey, Vatican City
- Three visits to Belgium

== 2026 ==
Country	Location(s)	Dates	Details
Poland	Kraków	19 May	Magyar travelled to Poland with ministers Anita Orbán, Zoltán Tarr and Dávid Vitézy. They held a press conference in front of the Wawel Cathedral.
Poland	Warsaw	20 May	Magyar meets Prime Minister Donald Tusk, President Karol Nawrocki, Marshal of the Sejm Włodzimierz Czarzasty, and Marshal of the Senate Małgorzata Kidawa-Błońska. Ministers Szabolcs Bóna, István Kapitány and Romulusz Ruszin-Szendi join his delegation.
Poland	Gdańsk	20 May	Along with Tusk, Magyar meets former Polish president Lech Wałęsa
Austria	Vienna	21 May	Magyar meets Chancellor Christian Stocker, President Alexander Van der Bellen and Minister for Europe, Integration and Family Claudia Bauer. Some of the planned events were cancelled due to domestic responsibilities.
Belgium	Brussels	28–29 May	Magyar negotiates with Secretary General of NATO Mark Rutte, Prime Minister of Belgium Bart De Wever and President of the European Commission Ursula von der Leyen. He declares Hungary's intention to join the EPPO. Von der Leyen declares the release of €16.4 billion of frozen funds to Hungary.
Germany	Berlin	2 June	Magyar meets German chancellor Friedrich Merz.
France	Paris	3 June	Magyar meets French president Emmanuel Macron.
Belgium	Brussels	18–19 June	Magyar attended the European Council meeting. The Hungarian RRF plan is approved and met with President of Ukraine Volodymyr Zelenskyy short conversations.
Turkey	Ankara	7–8 July	Magyar attends the 36th NATO summit and met with President of Ukraine Volodymyr Zelenskyy short conversations.
Slovenia	Bled	31 August	Magyar attend the Bled Strategic Forum and met with Prime Minister Janez Janša.
Slovakia	Bratislava	10 September	Magyar attend the 20th V4 summit and met with Prime Minister Robert Fico and President Peter Pellegrini, Prime Minister of Czech Republic Andrej Babis, Prime Minister of Poland Donald Tusk, Prime Minister of Ireland Micheál Martin.
Vatican City	Vatican City	24 September	Magyar is met with Pope Leo XIV.
Belgium	Brussels	15–16 October	Magyar attended the European Council.

== Future trips ==
Country	Areas visited	Date(s)	No.
Turkey	Antalya	November	Magyar is scheduled to attend the 2026 United Nations Climate Change Conference.
Ireland	Dublin	12 November	Magyar is scheduled to attend the 9th European Political Community Summit.

== Multilateral meetings ==
Magyar participated in the following summits during his premiership:

Group	Year			
Group	2026	2027	2028	2029
NATO	7–8 July, (Turkey) Ankara	TBD, (Albania) Tirana	TBD	TBD
EPC		TBD, (Switzerland) TBD	TBD, (Azerbaijan) TBD	TBD
EPC	12 November, (Republic of Ireland) Dublin	TBD, (Greece) TBD	TBD, (Latvia) TBD	TBD, (Netherlands) TBD
██ = Future event ██ = Did not attend / participate.
