= Second Orbán government =

Government of Hungary

Second Orbán government Government of National Cooperation
- 70th Cabinet of Hungary

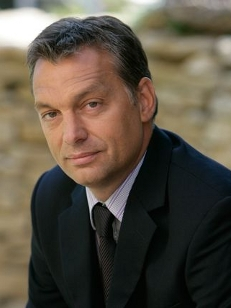
- Date formed: 29 May 2010
- Date dissolved: 6 June 2014

People and organisations
- Head of state: László Sólyom; Pál Schmitt; László Kövér (acting); János Áder
- Head of government: Viktor Orbán
- Head of government's history: 1998–2002, 2010–2026
- Member party: Fidesz; KDNP
- Status in legislature: Supermajority
- Opposition party: MSZP; Jobbik; LMP
- Opposition leader: Ildikó Lendvai (MSZP) (2010); Attila Mesterházy (MSZP) (2010–2014); László Botka (MSZP) (2014, acting)

History
- Election: 2010 election
- Outgoing election: 2014 election
- Legislature terms: 2010–2014
- Predecessor: Bajnai
- Successor: Orbán III

The second government of Viktor Orbán or the Government of National Cooperation (Hungarian: A Nemzeti Együttműködés Kormánya) was the government of Hungary from 29 May 2010 to 6 June 2014. Orbán formed his second cabinet after his party, Fidesz won the outright majority in the first round on April 11, with the Fidesz-KDNP alliance winning 206 seats, including 119 individual seats. In the final result, they won 263 seats (qualified majority), of which 173 are individual seats. Fidesz held 227 of these seats, giving it an outright majority in the National Assembly by itself.

== History ==
=== 2010 ===
The results of the 2009 European Parliamentary election foreshadowed a decisive Fidesz victory in the 2010 parliamentary elections. Finally, Fidesz won the outright majority in the first round on 11 April, winning 206 seats, including all 119 individual seats. After the second round of the elections they won a total of 263 seats in the parliament (out of 386), which was enough to change the Hungarian constitution. The sixth national assembly of the "III. Hungarian Republic" was established on 14 May 2010.

The new cabinet began working on legislation even before its inauguration. The representatives then accepted a bill of dual citizenship, granting Hungarian citizenship to every Hungarian in the Carpathian basin and around the world, aimed at offsetting the harmful effects of the Treaty of Trianon, and sparking a controversy between Hungary and Slovakia. Though János Martonyi, the new foreign minister, visited his Slovak colleague to discuss the issue of dual citizenship, Robert Fico stated that since Fidesz and the new government were not willing to negotiate the issue, which would be viewed as a question of national security. Ján Slota, Slovak government member and leader of the extreme right Slovak National Party, expressed his fear that Hungary wants to attack Slovakia and considered the situation as the "beginning of a war". As Prime Minister designate, Viktor Orbán firmly stated that he considers Slovak hysteria part of a political campaign. In response to the change in Hungarian citizenship law, the National Council of the Slovak Republic approved on 26 May 2010 a law stating that if a Slovak citizen applies for citizenship of another country then that person will automatically lose his/her Slovakian citizenship.

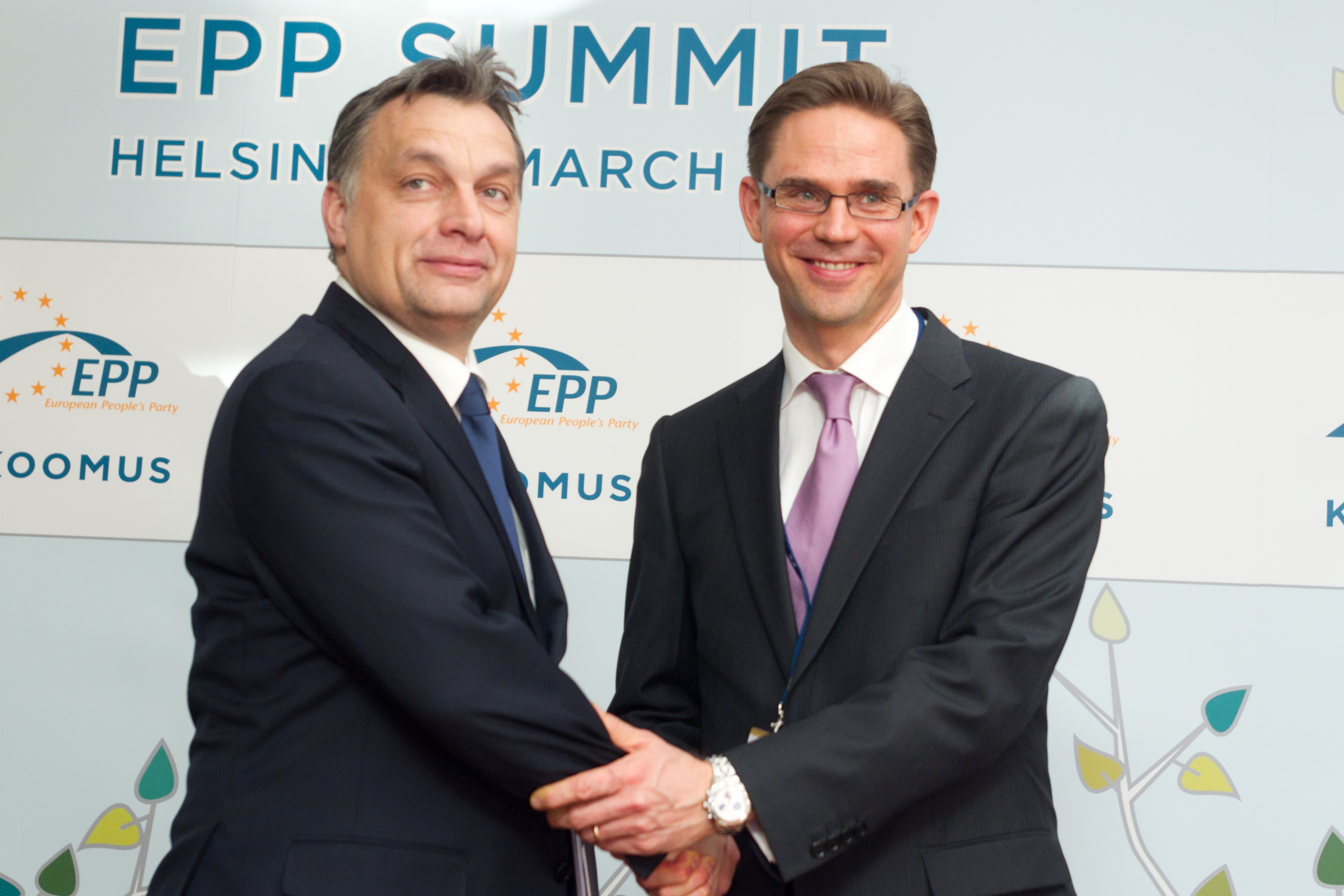
Orbán with Jyrki Katainen in at an EPP in Helsinki, March 2011

Orbán took the oath of office on 29 May 2010. With 261 votes, the Hungarian Parliament accepted him as leader of the ninth government since the end of communism. The opposition parties (MSZP, Jobbik and Politics Can Be Different) did not accept the cabinet's program (107 votes).

Orbán's first international visit was to Poland, as a symbol of establishing a central European alliance. Polish-Hungarian friendship has a long historical tradition.

In the autumn of 2010, Parliament passed a new media bill, setting up a new media council. The members of the council were accused of being biased, since all members were elected by the two-thirds parliamentary majority. Their – factually non-existent – authority to supervise media, issue decrees, and issue fines of up to 200 million forints was also questioned, though all decisions of the council can be appealed at an independent court. Since 2010, these allegations are kept on board persistently. The leader of the council, Annamária Szalai reacted to these allegations that neither the media bill nor other Hungarian regulations have given such competencies to the media authority. Still, the bill was widely criticized as jeopardizing freedom of the press in Hungary, however no specific provisions were named.

The European Commission criticized Orbán's second cabinet for its lack of compliance with economic deficit goals in 2010 and 2011, the nationalization of the country's compulsory private pension scheme and the cutting of the salary of state employees to a maximum of 2 million Hungarian forints (6.700 Euro) per month, including the Hungarian National Bank's director, claiming the government potentially undermined the independence of that institution.

=== 2011 ===
In the first four months of the year, Hungary's new constitution was created.

=== 2012 ===
As a part of the reform of the higher education, the cabinet reassessed the financing of the universities and high schools. The cabinet intended ceasing to fund certain disciplines, and also changed the conditions of the state subsidies of the higher education: "according to the new rules, a student accepting Hungarian state-funded support to pay for university study must sign an agreement to work in Hungary for a certain period of time within 20 years after graduation". The government officials declared that this a counter-measure against the brain drain phenomenon.

According to the deputy state secretary, Ferenc Kumin "The idea behind requiring students to stay and work in Hungary is that if the state paid for their education then it's reasonable to expect that they'll apply their new skills here in Hungary for a period of time."

The cabinet cut back the budget of the universities as well, and in order to supervise their expenditures, the government vindicated the right to appoint bursars. These measures were seen by the opposition parties and some professors as an effort to bring down the financial autonomy of the universities. Against these reforms, a sequence of demonstrations began.

After a series of negotiations with the protesters, secretary of state responsible for the education, Rózsa Hoffmann, was degraded to the rank of under-secretary of public education, and a new under-secretary of higher-education, István Klinghammer was appointed. The government also modified the previously introduced laws - since then it is possible to receive state scholarship in every subject, the number of bourses was increased and instead of contracts, the students have to sign a declaration stating that within 10 or 12 years after graduation, students that studied in state-funded places will be expected to work at Hungarian companies for the same length of time they had spent in state-financed higher education. Failing to do this, they will be expected to pay back the cost of their studies calculated at a rate that takes into consideration yearly inflation but will be interest-free.

=== 2013 ===
==== International criticism of the Fourth Amendment of the Constitution ====
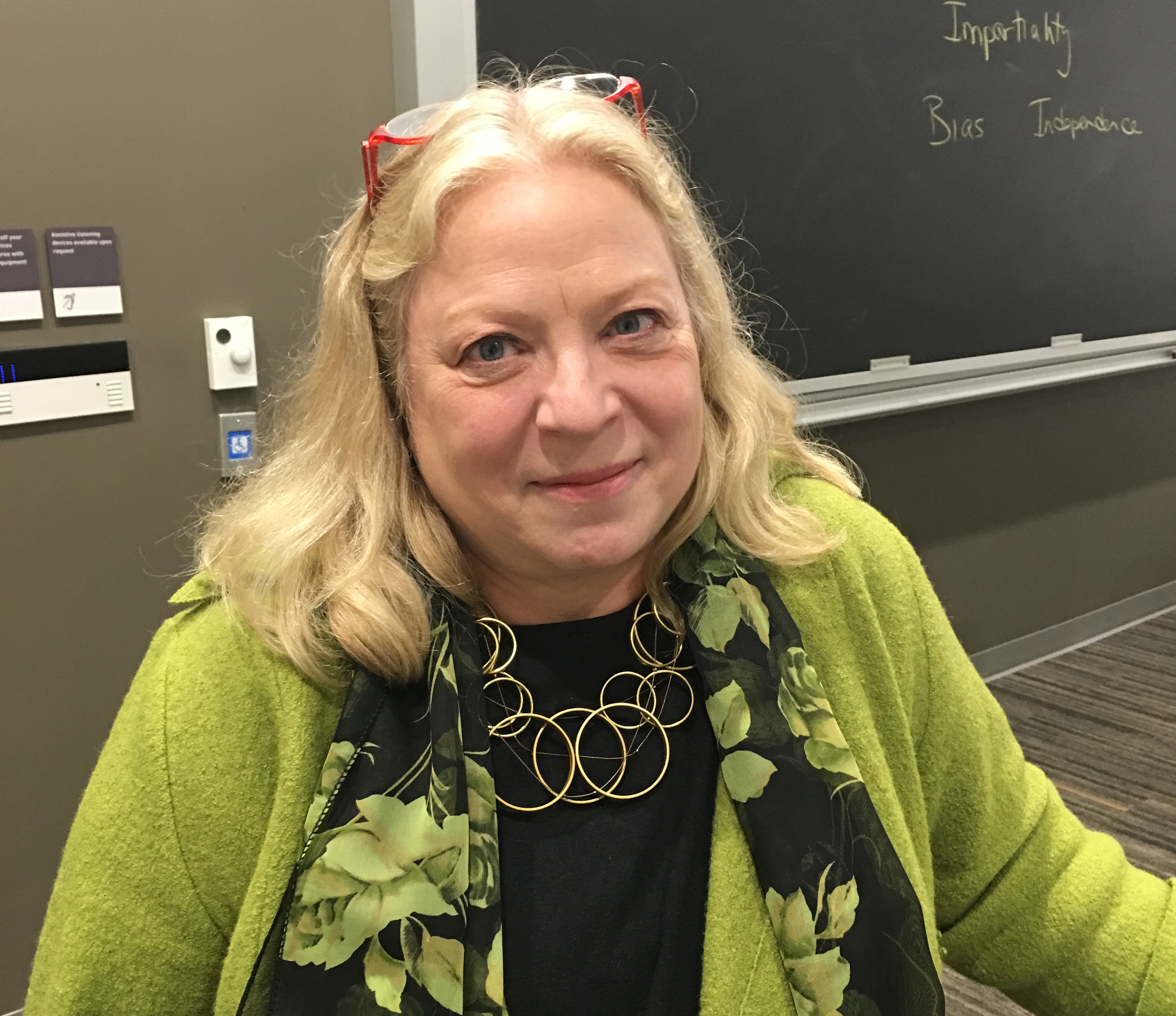
Kim Lane Scheppele

On 1 March 2013, Princeton University international constitutional law scholar, Hungary-specialist and political activist Kim Lane Scheppele wrote in a blog entry that the Hungarian ruling party's supermajority is re-introducing in one "mega-amendment" multiple constitutional amendments which had been introduced before and nullified by the Constitutional Court or changed at the insistence of European bodies. In his opinion the new constitutional mega-amendment again puts an end to the independence of the judiciary, brings universities under still more governmental control, opens the door to political prosecutions, criminalizes homelessness, makes the recognition of religious groups dependent on their cooperation with the government and weakens human rights guarantees across the board. In addition, the constitution will now buffer the government from further financial sanctions by permitting it to pass on all fines for noncompliance with the constitution or with European law to the Hungarian population as special taxes, not payable by the normal state budget. The mega-amendment annuls all of the decisions made by the Court before 1 January 2012 so that they have no legal effect. Henceforth no longer can anyone in the country – neither the Constitutional Court, nor the ordinary courts, nor human rights groups nor ordinary citizens – rely on the Court's prior string of rights-protecting decisions.

On 5 March 2013, Michael Link, the (liberal) undersecretary in the German Foreign Ministry, in "Hungary must remain a country of the law," called on Hungary "to demonstrate that the country has an effective separation of power between the legislative and the judicial."

On 6 March 2013, Europe's main human rights watchdog, Council of Europe President Thorbjorn Jagland (social democrat), said that the amendments set to be voted on next week by Hungarian lawmakers may be incompatible with European legal principles and asked the government to postpone the approval of a series of constitutional amendments, so legal experts can review the changes.

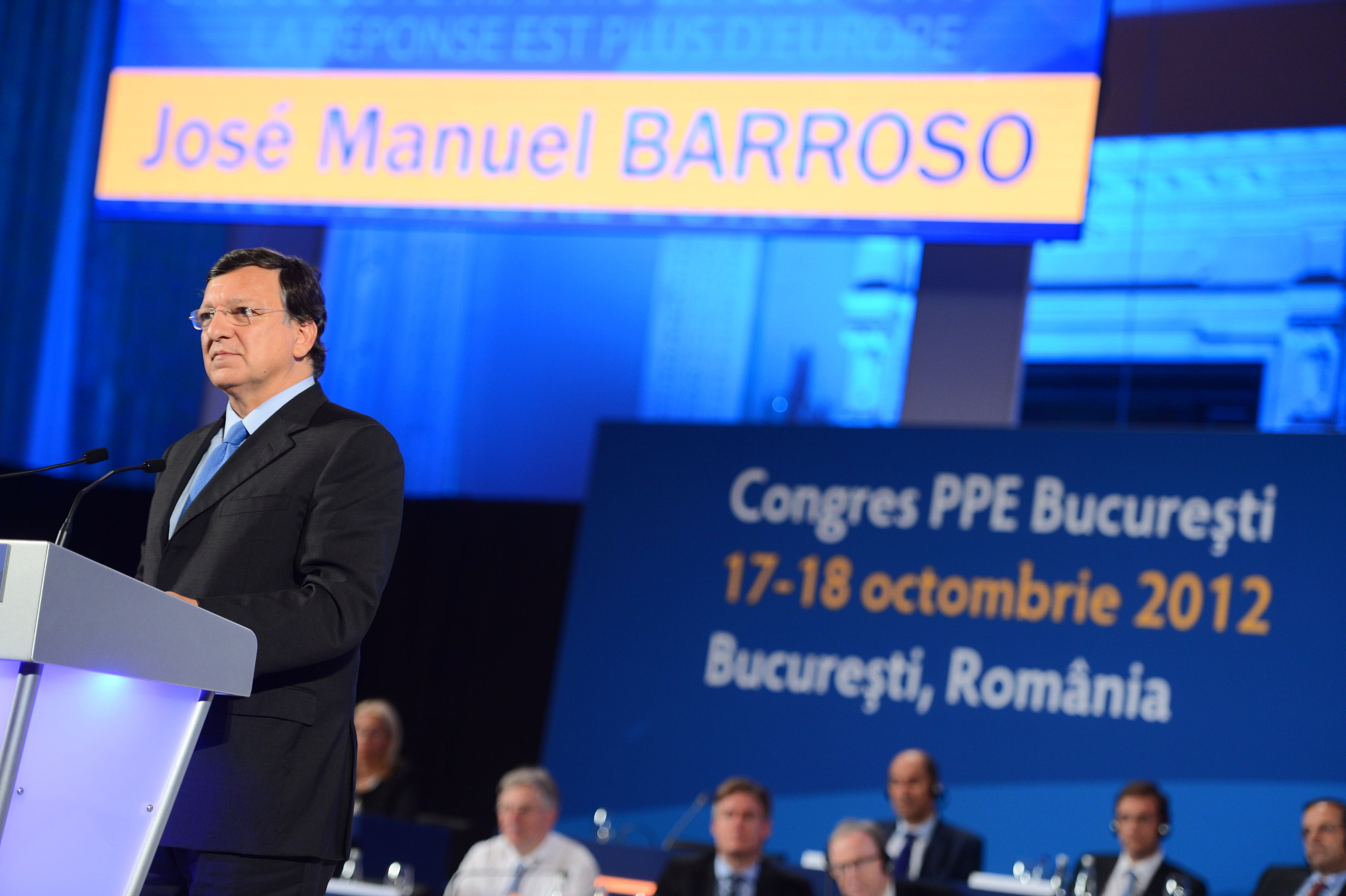
José Manuel Barroso

On 8 March 2013, the government of the United States raised its concerns both about the content of the proposed amendments "as they could threaten the principles of institutional independence and checks and balances that are the hallmark of democratic governance" and about the process by which they were to be accepted: "[The USA] "urges the Government of Hungary and the Parliament to ensure that the process of considering amendments to the constitution demonstrates respect for the rule of law and judicial review, openness to the views of other stakeholders across Hungarian society, and continuing receptiveness to the expertise of the Council of Europe's Venice Commission." On that same day, in a letter to the European Commission, Guido Westerwelle, the German foreign minister, and counterparts in Denmark, the Netherlands and Finland called for the European Union to be given new powers allowing it to freeze EU budget funds to a member state in breach of Europe's "fundamental values." Likewise on the same day, European Commission President José Manuel Barroso expressed concerns about the government over the amendment vote in Hungary's parliament the following week to change the constitution, arguing that it contravenes EU rules in areas such as the judiciary. On the 11th of March, "Hungary's parliament, dominated by Prime Minister Viktor Orbán's Fidesz party, adopted changes to the country's constitution on Monday despite warnings from the European Union and the U.S. government that the changes could weaken Hungary's democracy. The legislation was supported by 265 lawmakers in the 386-seat chamber, with 11 votes against and 33 abstentions."

Critiques have also been made in the official working documents of the European Parliament and by the Venice Commission on Hungary.

The June 2013 report of the European Commission on the Hungarian Constitution, the Tavares Report urged the Hungarian authorities "to implement as swiftly as possible all the measures the European Commission as the guardian of the treaties deems necessary in order to fully comply with EU law... [and with] the decisions of the Hungarian Constitutional Court and... the recommendations of the Venice Commission, the Council of Europe and other international bodies...".

In November 2013, Professor Scheppele outlined systemic infringement procedures the European Commission can use when member states violate basic principles of the European Union.

==== Government responses to critics ====
On 7 March, Deputy Prime Minister Tibor Navracsics sent a letter to the Secretary General of the Council of Europe Thorbjorn Jagland, to give some additional written explanations to the Proposal on the Fourth Amendment to Fundamental Law of Hungary.

On the 8th of March, Minister of Foreign Affairs, János Martonyi sent letter to the Ministers of Foreign Affairs of EU-member states, in which he gave details on the text of the amendment.

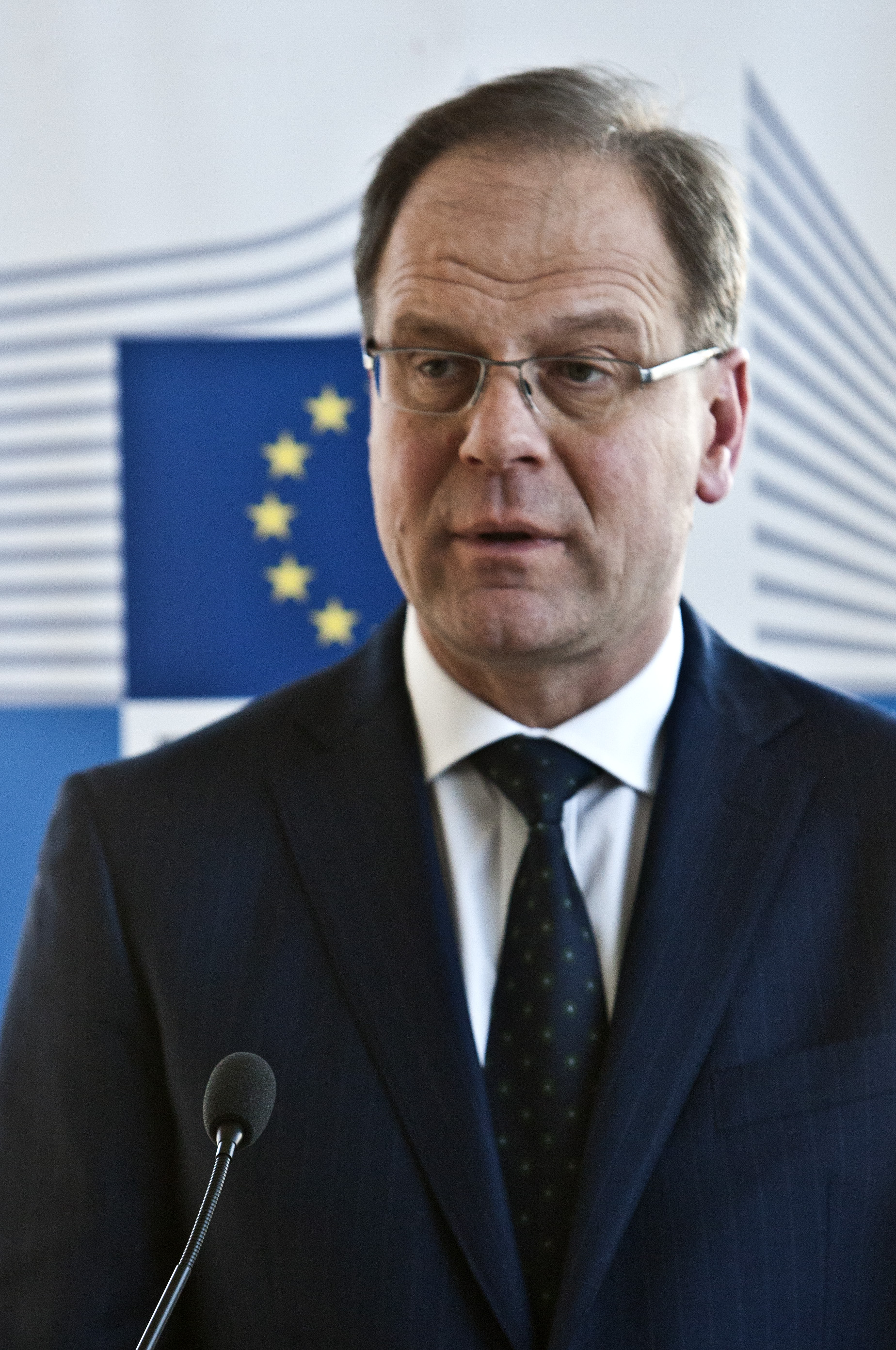
Tibor Navracsics

14 March, during a press conference in Brussels, Prime Minister Viktor Orbán said Budapest was ready to explain all the constitutional changes made by the Parliament. He also challenged critics to produce evidence of breaching the acquis communautaire or democratic principles. Rebuking the treatment of the EU, namely that Brussels asked the government to halt the process a day before the vote, he emphasized that Hungary's parliament had not enacted any law that restricts the Constitutional Court from assessing laws and their provisions. He also declared his government open to discussion.

In response to the Tavares-report, several members of the European Parliament declared, that it is the European left that criticizes the Hungarian Fundamental Law.

==== Further developments ====
The report of the EU-Commission appeared in June 2013.

The Parliamentary Assembly of the Council of Europe voted "not to put Hungary under surveillance over concerns about changes to its constitution."

In July 2013 US Congressman, Chris Smith, co-chairman of the US Helsinki Committee declared that "I am dealing with human rights issues in the Congress for 33 years now and these changes really had a great effect on me," criticisms are unfair, use double standards, misinterpretations, or incorrect information" and that "checks and balances are alive and well in Hungary.",

==== Fifth Amendment of the Fundamental Law ====
16 September 2013, following the consultations with the Venice Commission, the Hungarian National Assembly modified the constitution again. The amendment allows the commercial media broadcasters to air political ads free of charge, but they must operate similarly to public media channels. The transfer of cases between courts was nullified. The rule allowing the government to levy taxes to finance the debts, which occur due to court decisions was also suppressed. According to the new regulations all religious communities are entitled to operate freely, but those who seek further cooperation with the state (e.g., taking part in education, health care, social programs and so on) has to be voted on by the national assembly to receive an official status."

In October, 2013 Thorbjørn Jagland, Secretary General of the Council of Europe declared that the laws on the media and the judiciary that had been so heavily criticised were amended, and the European institutions were satisfied with that. He welcomed the cooperation of foreign secretary Martonyi with the Venice Commission, and he finally concluded that "A number of criticisms can still be made, of course, but the Hungarians have gone a long way in correcting much of the legislation that the international community has so heavily criticised."

US Assistant Secretary of State for European and Eurasian Affairs, Victoria Nuland declared "The US side assessed the fifth amendment to the basic law as a step in the right direction,"

== Party breakdown ==
=== Beginning of term ===
Party breakdown of cabinet ministers in the beginning of term:

- Fidesz
6
- KDNP
1
- Independents
3

=== End of term ===
Party breakdown of cabinet ministers in the end of term:

- Fidesz
8
- KDNP
1
- Independents
2

== Vote in parliament ==
Election of the Prime Minister; Viktor Orbán (Fidesz)
Ballot →	29 May 2010
Required majority →	194 out of 386
Yes: • Fidesz (225); • KDNP (36)	261 / 386
No: • MSZP (54); • Jobbik (40); • LMP (13)	107 / 386
Abstain	0 / 386
Not voting: • Jobbik (7); • MSZP (5); • LMP (3); • Fidesz (2); • Independent (1)	18 / 386

== Members of the Cabinet ==
Office	Name	Party	Term
Prime Minister's Office
Prime Minister	Viktor Orbán	Fidesz	2010–2014
Deputy Prime Ministers
Deputy Prime Minister	Zsolt Semjén	KDNP	2010–2014
Deputy Prime Minister	Tibor Navracsics	Fidesz	2010–2014
Ministers
Minister of Foreign Affairs	János Martonyi	Fidesz	2010–2014
Minister of Interior	Sándor Pintér	Independent	2010–2014
Minister of Administration and Justice	Tibor Navracsics	Fidesz	2010–2014
Minister of National Economy	György Matolcsy	Fidesz	2010–2013
Minister of National Economy	Mihály Varga	Fidesz	2013–2014
Minister of National Resources	Miklós Réthelyi	Independent	2010–2012
Minister of National Resources	Zoltán Balog	Fidesz	2012–2014
Minister of National Development	Tamás Fellegi	Independent	2010–2011
Minister of National Development	Tibor Navracsics (ad temporarily)	Fidesz	2011
Minister of National Development	Lászlóné Németh	Independent	2011–2014
Minister of Agriculture	Sándor Fazekas	Fidesz	2010–2014
Minister of Defence	Csaba Hende	Fidesz	2010–2014
Ministers without portfolio
Minister for National Politics	Zsolt Semjén	KDNP	2014–2018
Minister for Liaising with International Financial Organisations	Tamás Fellegi	Independent	2011–2012
Minister for Liaising with International Financial Organisations	Mihály Varga	Fidesz	2012–2013

== Composition ==
Coalition members: Fidesz, KDNP, and Independent ministers

Office	Image	Incumbent	Political party	In office
Prime Minister		Viktor Orbán	Fidesz	29 May 2010 – 10 May 2014
Deputy Prime Minister (First); Minister without portfolio for National Politics		Zsolt Semjén	KDNP	29 May 2010 – 6 June 2014
Deputy Prime Minister; Minister of Administration and Justice		Tibor Navracsics	Fidesz	29 May 2010 – 6 June 2014
Minister of Interior		Sándor Pintér	Independent	29 May 2010 – 6 June 2014
Minister of Foreign Affairs		János Martonyi	Fidesz	29 May 2010 – 6 June 2014
Minister of National Economy		György Matolcsy	Fidesz	29 May 2010 – 3 March 2013
Minister of National Economy		Mihály Varga	Fidesz	7 March 2013 – 6 June 2014
Minister of National Resources (Human Resources since 14 May 2012)		Miklós Réthelyi	Independent	29 May 2010 – 13 May 2012
Minister of National Resources (Human Resources since 14 May 2012)		Zoltán Balog	Fidesz	14 May 2012 – 6 June 2014
Minister of National Development		Tamás Fellegi	Independent	29 May 2010 – 14 December 2011
Minister of National Development		Tibor Navracsics (temporarily)	Fidesz	14 December 2011 – 23 December 2011
Minister of National Development		Lászlóné Németh	Independent	23 December 2011 – 6 June 2014
Minister of Agriculture		Sándor Fazekas	Fidesz	29 May 2010 – 6 June 2014
Minister of Defence		Csaba Hende	Fidesz	29 May 2010 – 6 June 2014
Minister without portfolio for liaising with international financial organisations		Tamás Fellegi	Independent	15 December 2011 – 2 June 2012
Minister without portfolio for liaising with international financial organisations		Mihály Varga	Fidesz	2 June 2012 – 6 March 2013
