= Magyar government =

Government of Hungary

- 74th Cabinet of Hungary
- Current
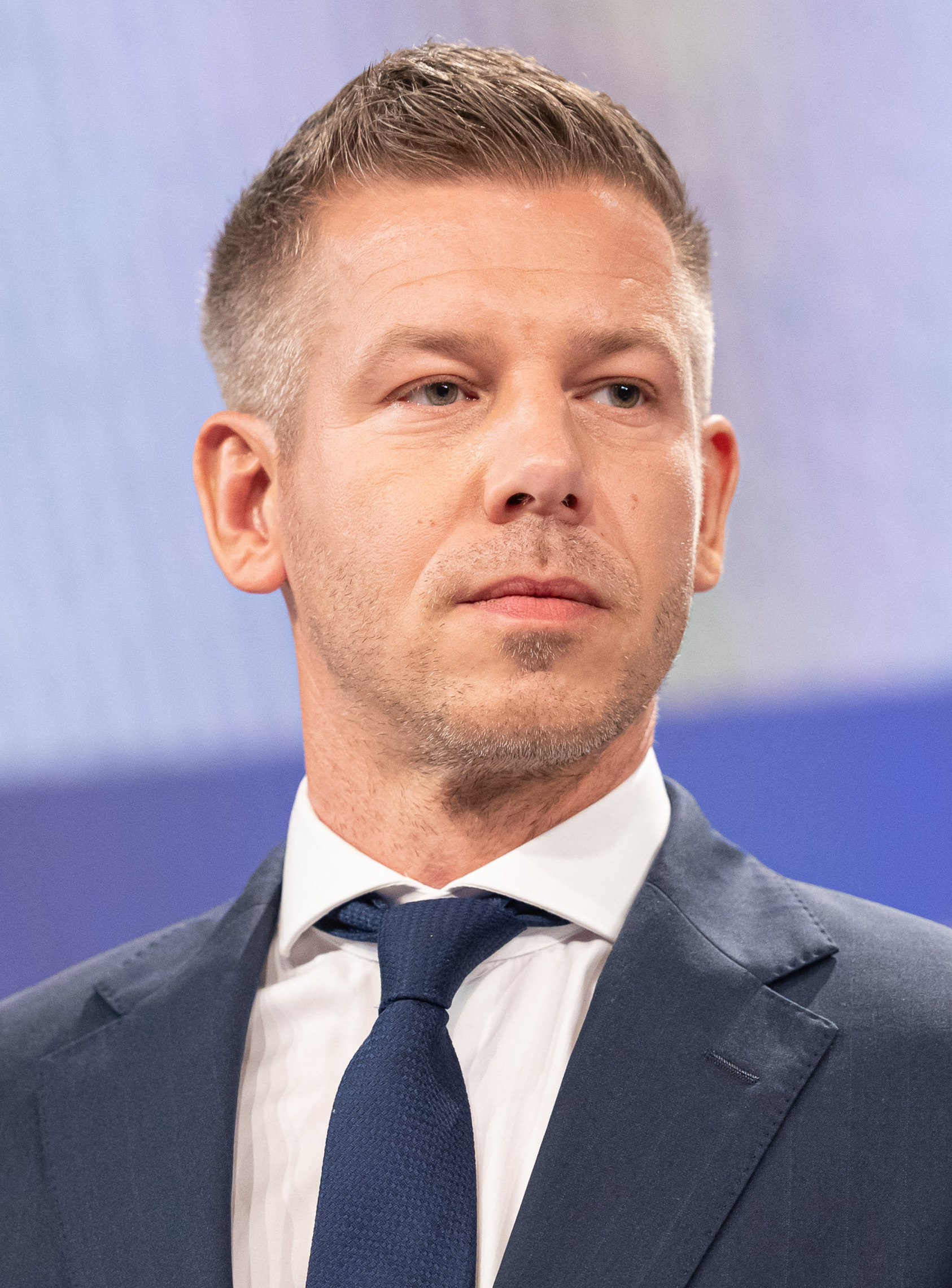
- Date formed: 13 May 2026

People and organisations
- Head of state: Tamás Sulyok; Ágnes Forsthoffer (acting); András Baka
- Head of government: Péter Magyar
- Deputy head of government: Anita Orbán; Bálint Ruff
- Total no. of members: 17
- Member party: TISZA
- Status in legislature: Supermajority
- Opposition parties: Fidesz; KDNP; MH
- Opposition leader: Viktor Orbán (Fidesz)

History
- Election: 2026
- Legislature terms: 2026–2030
- Predecessor: Orbán V

The Magyar government or Tisza government (Note: Because magyar is also the endonym for Hungarian and without a way of verbally distinguishing between Péter Magyar’s personal name and the adjective magyar (in written Hungarian, only the personal name would be capitalized, allowing for differentiation there), some sources use "Tisza government" as the more specific descriptor. However, in some contexts, "Tisza government" may also refer to the premiership of Kálmán Tisza or his son István Tisza, two prime ministers of Hungary during the Dual Monarchy.) is the current government of Hungary. It is a single-party government composed of the Tisza Party and led by Péter Magyar, who became prime minister following the 2026 general election. Tisza currently enjoys a two-thirds supermajority in the National Assembly, which is the legislative threshold for amending the Fundamental Law of Hungary. It is notable for being the first non-Fidesz-led government in sixteen years.

== History ==
On 9 May 2026 was the inaugural meeting of the National Assembly, officially ending the 16-year Orbán era. On the proposal of the winning Tisza Party, President Tamás Sulyok scheduled the event for a Saturday, thus allowing a large-scale national event in the capital to be held alongside the parliamentary events.

On the inaugural meeting, the President officially asked Péter Magyar to form the government. The National Assembly elected him the same day as Prime Minister, and Magyar immediately swore the oath of office. After his speech and the ceremony, the inauguration ended with a large celebration in front of the Hungarian Parliament Building.

On 12 May, Magyar's government was formed with sixteen ministers. He announced that the leaders of the health, justice, education and finance portfolios get a veto in the acts of the government. The next day, the government had its first seating in Ópusztaszer, which produced numerous decisions.

== Party breakdown ==
Party breakdown of cabinet ministers:

- TISZA
- Independents
13
4

== Vote in Parliament ==
Election of the Prime Minister; Péter Magyar (TISZA)
Ballot →	9 May 2026
Required majority →	100 out of 199
Yes: • TISZA (140)	140 / 199
No: • Fidesz (41); • KDNP (7); • MHM (6)	54 / 199
Abstain: • KDNP (1)	1 / 199
Not voting: • Fidesz (3); • TISZA (1)	4 / 199

== Members of the cabinet ==
Magyar's announcement of the members of his cabinet started from the week starting on 20 April 2026.

Magyar originally designated Márton Melléthei-Barna as Minister of Justice on 30 April; however, he withdrew from nomination on 7 May, citing conflict of interest, being Magyar's brother-in-law. Rita Rubovszky was originally intended by the Tisza Party to be Minister of Children and Education, but was ultimately not selected due to loud public disapproval of her nomination. Kriszta Bódis and Ervin Nagy had also previously been floated as potential Minister of Social and Family Affairs and Minister of Social Relations and Culture—given their works as experts for the Tisza Party in these fields—, but they ultimately received other government positions.

Office	Name	Party	Term
Prime Minister's Office
Prime Minister	Péter Magyar	TISZA	2026–
Deputy Prime Minister	Anita Orbán	TISZA	2026–
Deputy Prime Minister	Bálint Ruff	Independent	2026–
Minister of the Prime Minister's Office	Bálint Ruff	Independent	2026–
Cabinet Ministers
Minister of Foreign Affairs	Anita Orbán	TISZA	2026–
Minister of Interior	Gábor Pósfai	TISZA	2026–
Minister of Finance	András Kármán	TISZA	2026–
Minister of Economy and Energy	István Kapitány	TISZA	2026–
Minister of Justice	Márta Görög	Independent	2026–
Minister of Children and Education	Judit Lannert	Independent	2026–
Minister of Health	Zsolt Hegedűs	TISZA	2026–
Minister of Defense	Romulusz Ruszin-Szendi	TISZA	2026–
Minister of the Living Environment	László Gajdos	TISZA	2026–
Minister of Agriculture and Food Industry	Szabolcs Bóna	TISZA	2026–
Minister of Transport and Investment	Dávid Vitézy	Independent	2026–
Minister of Social and Family Affairs	Vilmos Kátai-Németh	TISZA	2026–
Minister of Social Relations and Culture	Zoltán Tarr	TISZA	2026–
Minister of Regional and Rural Development	Viktória Lőrincz	TISZA	2026–
Minister of Science and Technology	Zoltán Tanács	TISZA	2026–

== Composition ==
Office	Image	Incumbent	Political party	In office	Secretaries of State
Cabinet Ministers
Prime Minister		Péter Magyar	TISZA	9 May 2026–present	Zsuzsanna Ágnes Ducsay (State Secretary for Public Administration)
Deputy Prime Minister Minister of Foreign Affairs		Anita Orbán	TISZA	13 May 2026–present	Gabriella Katalin Kereszty (State Secretary for Public Administration); Klára Breuer; Krisztián Mészáros; György László Velkey
Deputy Prime Minister Minister of the Prime Minister's Office		Bálint Ruff	Independent	13 May 2026–present	Zsuzsanna Ágnes Ducsay (State Secretary for Public Administration); András Bíró-Nagy; Bence Csontos; Norbert Rudolf Kustánczi; Zsófia Anna Nagy
Minister of Interior		Gábor Pósfai	TISZA	13 May 2026–present	András Tibor Retteghy (State Secretary for Public Administration); Ferenc Tibor Halmai; Attila Kálnoki-Kiss; Gábor Tóth
Minister of Finance		András Kármán	TISZA	13 May 2026–present	Judit Pettkó-Szandtner (State Secretaty for Public Administration); Gyula Barabás; Nikoletta Boda; Attila Zoltán Kövesdy
Minister of Economy and Energy		István Kapitány	TISZA	13 May 2026–present	Mátyás Zimmer (State Secretary for Public Administration); Ágnes Margit Fábián; Áron Porcher; András Tóth; Judit Zolnay
Minister of Justice		Márta Görög	Independent	13 May 2026–present	Fruzsina Kinga Gárdos-Orosz (State Secretary for Public Administration); Péter Bódis
Minister of Children and Education		Judit Lannert	Independent	13 May 2026–present	Bulcsú Balázs Benedek (State Secretary for Public Administration); Marietta Lányi; Sándor Katz; Zsuzsanna Naderi; Judit Kereki; Balázs Kapronczai
Minister of Health		Zsolt Hegedűs	TISZA	13 May 2026–present	Lívia Ilku (State Secretary for Public Administration); László Buga; Krisztina Porpáczy; Tamás Svéd; Zoltán Vokó
Minister of Defense		Romulusz Ruszin-Szendi	TISZA	13 May 2026–present	Attila Tóth (State Secretary for Public Administration); László Antal Kürtös; Zsolt Sándor; Attila Varga
Minister of the Living Environment		László Gajdos	TISZA	13 May 2026–present	Zsolt Illés Rozinka (State Secretary for Public Administration); Zsuzsanna Kertész-Káldosi; Viktória Bögi; Levente Kőrösi; Ágnes Kelemen
Minister of Agriculture and Food Industry		Szabolcs Bóna	TISZA	13 May 2026–present	Gábor Nagy (State Secretary for Public Administration); Nikolett Árvay; László Búza; Krisztina Jobbágy; János István Molnár
Minister of Transport and Investment		Dávid Vitézy	Independent	13 May 2026–present	Katalin Sirály (State Secretary for Public Administration); Zsolt Barna; Zsolt Tárkányi; Samu Szemerey
Minister of Social and Family Affairs		Vilmos Kátai-Németh	TISZA	13 May 2026–present	Adrienn Judit Bokor (State Secretary for Public Administration); Tímea Barna-Szabó; Eszter Eliás; Szilvia Gyurkó; Kinga Dóra Tóth
Minister of Social Relations and Culture		Zoltán Tarr	TISZA	13 May 2026–present	Zsuzsanna Kiss (State Secretary for Public Administration); György Heidl; Ervin Nagy; Zsolt Sári; Enikő Tompa
Minister of Regional and Rural Development		Viktória Lőrincz	TISZA	13 May 2026–present	Éva Erika Gál (State Secretary for Public Administration); Péter Bence Stumpf; Mátyás Szabó
Minister of Science and Technology		Zoltán Tanács	TISZA	13 May 2026–present	György Sántha (State Secretary for Public Administration); László Bicskei; Péter Horváth; Andrea Polereczki

== Officials ==
=== Government commissioners ===
- Kriszta Bódis, Commissioner for Social Policy Strategy (13 May 2026–)
- Márk Radnai, Commissioner for a Humane and Functional Hungary (13 May 2026–)
- Andrea Rost, Commissioner for Hungarian Music Culture (13 May 2026–)

=== Government spokespeople ===
- Anita Köböl (13 May 2026–)
- Éva Magyar (13 May 2026–)
- Vanda Szondi (13 May 2026–)
