= Deputy Prime Minister of Hungary =

Senior member of the Government of Hungary

General Deputy to the Prime Minister of Hungary
- Magyarország miniszterelnökének általános helyettese

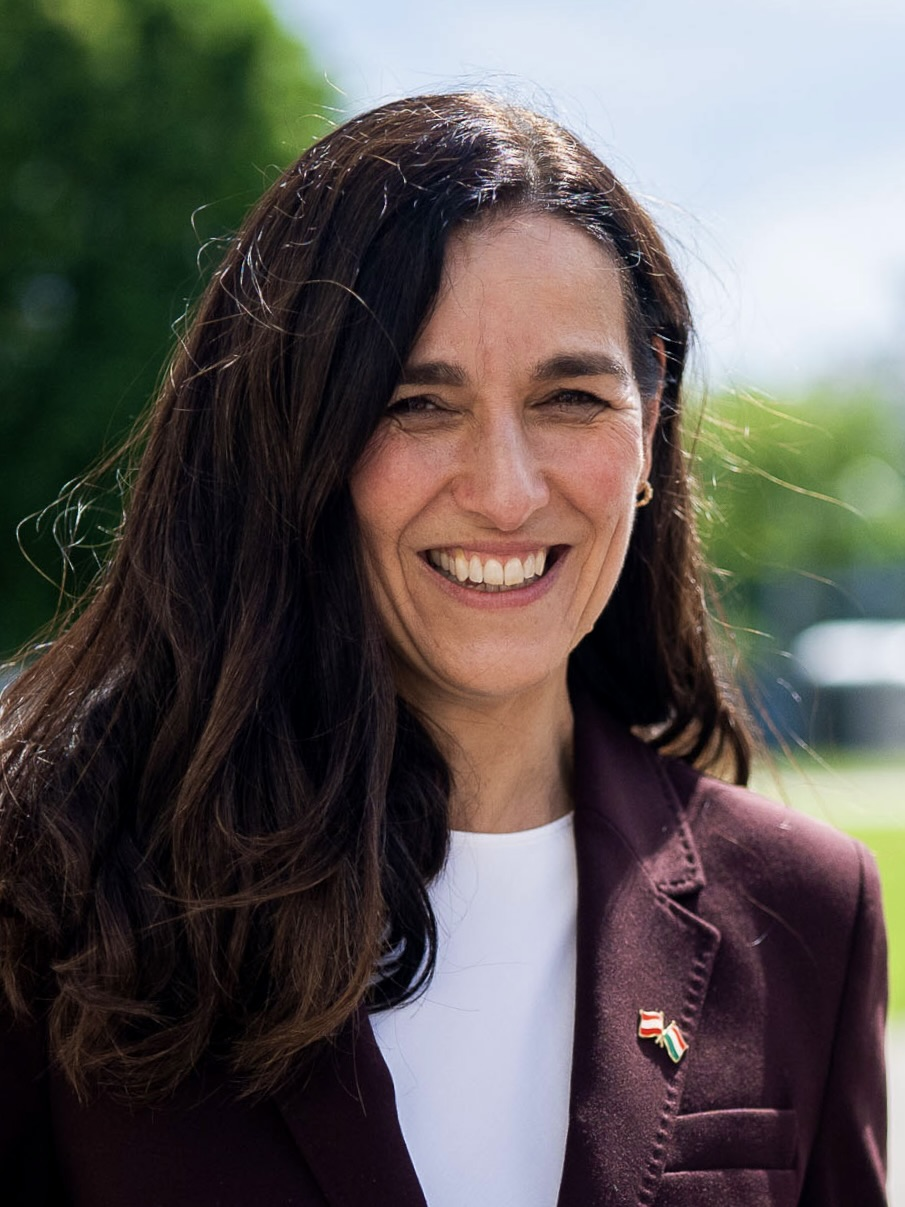
- Incumbent; Anita Orbán since 16 May 2026
- Government of Hungary; Prime Minister's Office
- Style: Ms. Deputy Prime Minister (informal)
- Type: Cabinet minister
- Member of: Cabinet; Parliament
- Reports to: Prime Minister of Hungary
- Seat: Ministry of Justice
- Nominator: Prime Minister of Hungary
- Appointer: President of Hungary
- Inaugural holder: Bertalan Szemere (de facto)
- Formation: 23 March 1848
- Deputy: Deputy Prime Minister
- Website: kormany.hu

Deputy Prime Minister of Hungary
- Magyarország miniszterelnök-helyettese

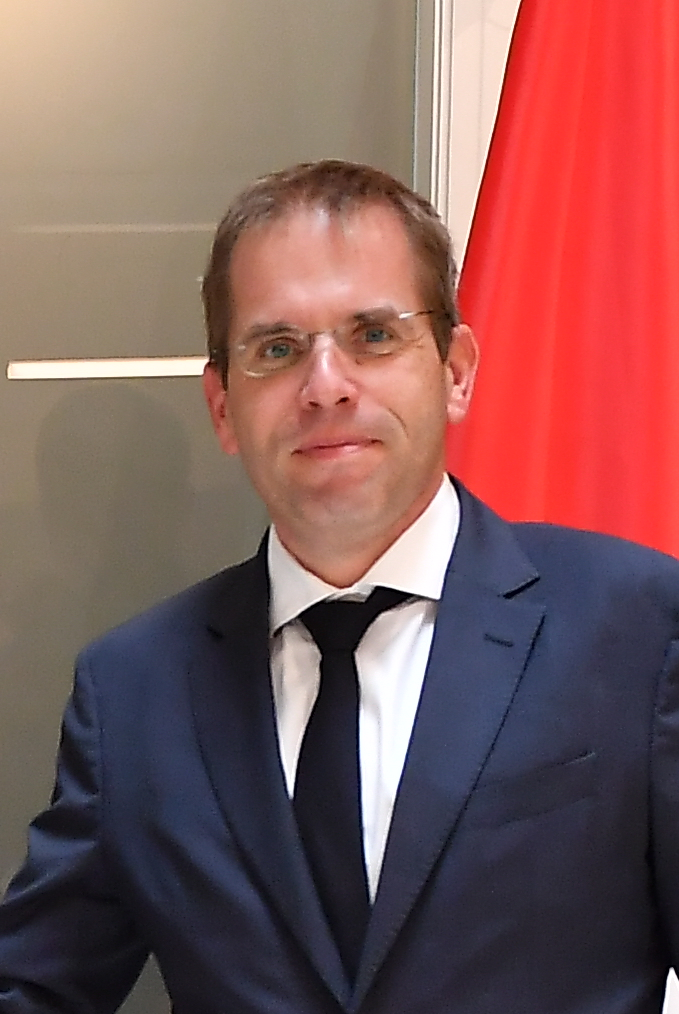
- Incumbent; Bálint Ruff since 16 May 2026
- Government of Hungary; Prime Minister's Office
- Style: Mr. Deputy Prime Minister (informal)
- Type: Cabinet minister
- Member of: Cabinet; Parliament
- Reports to: Prime Minister of Hungary; General Deputy
- Seat: Prime Minister's Office
- Nominator: Prime Minister of Hungary
- Appointer: Prime Minister of Hungary
- Inaugural holder: Bertalan Szemere (de facto)
- Formation: 23 March 1848
- Website: kormany.hu

The deputy prime minister of Hungary (Hungarian: Magyarország miniszterelnök-helyettese), officially the general deputy to the prime minister of Hungary (Hungarian: Magyarország miniszterelnökének általános helyettese), is a senior member of the Hungarian Cabinet. The office of the Deputy Prime Minister is not a permanent position, existing only at the discretion of the Prime Minister, who may appoint to other offices to give seniority to a particular Cabinet minister. The officeholder is responsible for specific coordination and policy areas defined by law. If the Prime Minister does not nominate a deputy prime minister, the Minister of the Interior acts as first in the order of substitution within the government hierarchy, according to established governmental practice and statutory regulation governing substitution of ministers. The office is currently held by Anita Orbán under Péter Magyar's premiership.

== Terminology ==
Hungarian usage distinguishes between:

- Deputy Prime Minister: The title is typically held by a serving cabinet minister who also retains another ministerial portfolio (commonly interior, justice, or finance). In such cases, the designation primarily indicates first place in the order of succession to the Prime Minister and does not confer formal superiority over other members of the Cabinet. At various times, Hungary has had more than one deputy prime minister serving simultaneously.

The incumbent deputy prime minister is Bálint Ruff, who has served since 16 May 2026.

- General Deputy of the Prime Minister: member of the Cabinet without an independent ministerial portfolio, but with a designated office, who substitutes for the Prime Minister in accordance with the order determined by the Prime Minister and who is assigned specific statutory coordination responsibilities.

The incumbent general deputy of the prime minister is Anita Orbán, who has served since 13 May 2026.

== Responsibilities ==
The legal framework for the office is primarily defined in the Government Decree No. 182/2022. (V. 24.) on the duties and powers of the members of the Government. The general deputy substitutes for the Prime Minister according to the order determined by the head of government.

The deputy prime minister's statutory portfolio includes:

- Coordination of relations with churches
- Church policy and church diplomacy
- Preparation of legislation relating to religious communities
- Coordination of governmental strategy concerning church affairs

The general deputy has responsibilities in national policy (nemzetpolitika), including coordination relating to Hungarian communities living outside Hungary and related government programmes such as the Bethlen Gábor Fund and cross-border cooperation initiatives. The portfolio also includes nationalities policy (nemzetiségpolitika), including the preparation of legislation concerning the rights of nationalities, the coordination with nationality self-governments and the oversight of Hungary's implementation of the European Charter for Regional or Minority Languages (1992) and the Framework Convention for the Protection of National Minorities (1995) The deputy prime minister also versees administrative functions relating to state decorations and recognitions awarded by the President of Hungary, the Government, and the Prime Minister.

== List of officeholders ==
=== Kingdom of Hungary (1848–1849) and the Hungarian State (1849) ===
Parties Opposition Party (EP)

No.	Portrait	Name (Birth–Death)	Term of office			Party	Cabinet
No.	Portrait	Name (Birth–Death)	Took office	Left office	Tenure	Party	Cabinet
Office not in use		23 March 1848 – 16 September 1848					Batthyány
Deputy President of the Committee of National Defence
1		Pál Nyáry (1805–1871)	16 September 1848	14 April 1849	194 days	EP	Committee of National Defence
Office not in use		14 April 1849 – 11 August 1849					Szemere

=== Kingdom of Hungary (1867–1918) ===
No.	Portrait	Name (Birth–Death)	Term of office			Party	Cabinet
No.	Portrait	Name (Birth–Death)	Took office	Left office	Tenure	Party	Cabinet
Office not in use		17 February 1867 – 16 November 1918					

=== Hungarian People's Republic (1918–1919) ===
No.	Portrait	Name (Birth–Death)	Term of office			Party	Cabinet
No.	Portrait	Name (Birth–Death)	Took office	Left office	Tenure	Party	Cabinet
Office not in use		16 November 1918 – 21 March 1919					Károlyi Berinkey

=== Hungarian Soviet Republic (1919) ===
Parties KMP

No.	Portrait	Name (Birth–Death)	Term of office			Party	Cabinet
No.	Portrait	Name (Birth–Death)	Took office	Left office	Tenure	Party	Cabinet
Deputy Chairman of the Revolutionary Governing Council of the Hungarian Soviet Republic
1		Antal Dovcsák (1879–1962)	24 June 1919	1 August 1919	38 days	KMP	Revolutionary Governing Council

=== Hungarian Republic (1919–1920) ===
No.	Portrait	Name (Birth–Death)	Term of office			Party	Cabinet
No.	Portrait	Name (Birth–Death)	Took office	Left office	Tenure	Party	Cabinet
Office not in use		6 August 1919 – 29 February 1920					Friedrich Huszár

=== Kingdom of Hungary (1920–1946) ===
MMP Arrow Cross Party Hungarian Communist Party

No.	Portrait	Name (Birth–Death)	Term of office			Party	Cabinet
No.	Portrait	Name (Birth–Death)	Took office	Left office	Tenure	Party	Cabinet
Deputy Prime Minister of the Kingdom of Hungary
Office not in use		29 February 1920 – 21 March 1944					See list: Károly Huszár S. Simonyi-Semadam Pál Teleki István Bethlen Gyula Károlyi Gyula Gömbös Kálmán Darányi Béla Imrédy Pál Teleki László Bárdossy Miklós Kállay
1		General; Jenő Rácz (1882–1952)	22 March 1944	29 August 1944	160 days	MMP	Sztójay
Office not in use		29 August 1944 – 16 October 1944					Lakatos
2		Jenő Szöllősi (1893–1946)	16 October 1944	28 March 1945	163 days	NYKP	Szálasi
3		Mátyás Rákosi (1892–1971)	15 November 1945	1 February 1946	78 days	MKP	Tildy

=== Republic of Hungary (1989–2012) and Hungary (2012–present) ===
Fidesz Christian Democratic People's Party (KDNP)

No.	Portrait	Name (Birth–Death)	Term of office			Party	Cabinet
No.	Portrait	Name (Birth–Death)	Took office	Left office	Tenure	Party	Cabinet
Deputy Prime Minister of Hungary
Office not in use		23 May 1990 – 1 June 2010					See list: Antall Boross Horn Orbán I Medgyessy Gyurcsány I Gyurcsány II Bajnai
2		Tibor Navracsics (1966–)	1 June 2010	6 June 2014	4 years, 5 days	Fidesz	Orbán II
3		Mihály Varga (1965–)	18 May 2018	4 June 2024	4 years, 17 days	Fidesz	Orbán IV
4		Sándor Pintér (1948–)	18 May 2018	4 June 2024	4 years, 17 days	Fidesz	Orbán IV
5		Zsolt Semjén (1962–)	1 June 2010	12 May 2026	15 years, 345 days	KDNP	Orbán II Orbán III Orbán IV Orbán V
6		Anita Orbán (1974–)	16 May 2026	Incumbent	124 days	Tisza	Magyar
7		Bálint Ruff (1981–)	19 May 2026	Incumbent	121 days	Independent	Magyar

== See also ==
- Prime Minister of Hungary
- Government of Hungary
- Cabinet of Hungary

== Sources ==
- "Magyarország Kormánya – Miniszterelnök-helyettes". Magyarország Kormánya (in Hungarian). Miniszterelnökség.
- "Magyarország Alaptörvénye (2011)". Nemzeti Jogszabálytár (in Hungarian).
- "Deputy Prime Minister". The Government of Hungary. Prime Minister's Office.
- "Government Decree 182/2022 (V. 24.) on the duties and powers of members of the Government". International Labour Organization (Natlex).
