= Zsuzsanna Németh =

Hungarian politician and economist

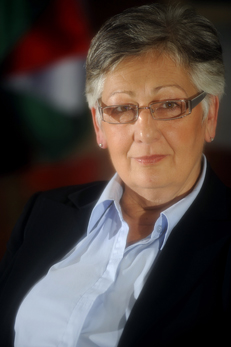

Minister of National Development
- In office 23 December 2011 – 6 June 2014
- Preceded by: Tibor Navracsics (Acting)
- Succeeded by: Miklós Seszták

Personal details
- Born: 16 July 1953 (age 72) Budapest, Hungary
- Spouse: László Németh
- Children: 2
- Profession: politician, economist

Lászlóné Németh or Zsuzsanna Németh (née Zsuzsanna Serényi; born 16 July 1953 in Budapest), Hungarian politician and economist, who served as Minister of National Development in Viktor Orbán's government between 23 December 2011 and 6 June 2014.

She was nominated for the position after resignation of Tamás Fellegi in December 2011. Formerly she was the deputy chief executive and member of the board of directors of the Hungarian Development Bank (MFB). After her appointment, Németh became the only female minister in the current government. The opposition (Hungarian Socialist Party, Jobbik and Politics Can Be Different) strongly criticized her because Németh does not hold a degree from a higher education institute. It was probably with her in mind that the MFB changed its rules to allow people onto its board who although lacking a diploma have “at least ten years of relevant experience”, a source told the Origo.hu.

The other point, focused on the fact that “Lászlóné Németh” is her married name, which in English is the equivalent of “Mrs. László Németh”, but that it doesn't make clear what her actual first name is (later became known that her maiden name is Zsuzsanna Serényi). According to Index.hu, Németh is the third woman minister in Hungarian history to be known solely by her married name, as in previous cases a female minister either served using her maiden name, or the method by which her maiden name followed her husband's name.

== Sources ==
- Development minister nominee unknown quantity in more ways than one
- Németh Lászlóné életrajza a ProfitLine oldalán (in Hungarian)

Political offices
Preceded by Tibor Navracsics	Minister of National Development; 2011–2014	Succeeded by Miklós Seszták
