= Zsolt Semjén =

Hungarian politician

Zsolt Semjén MP
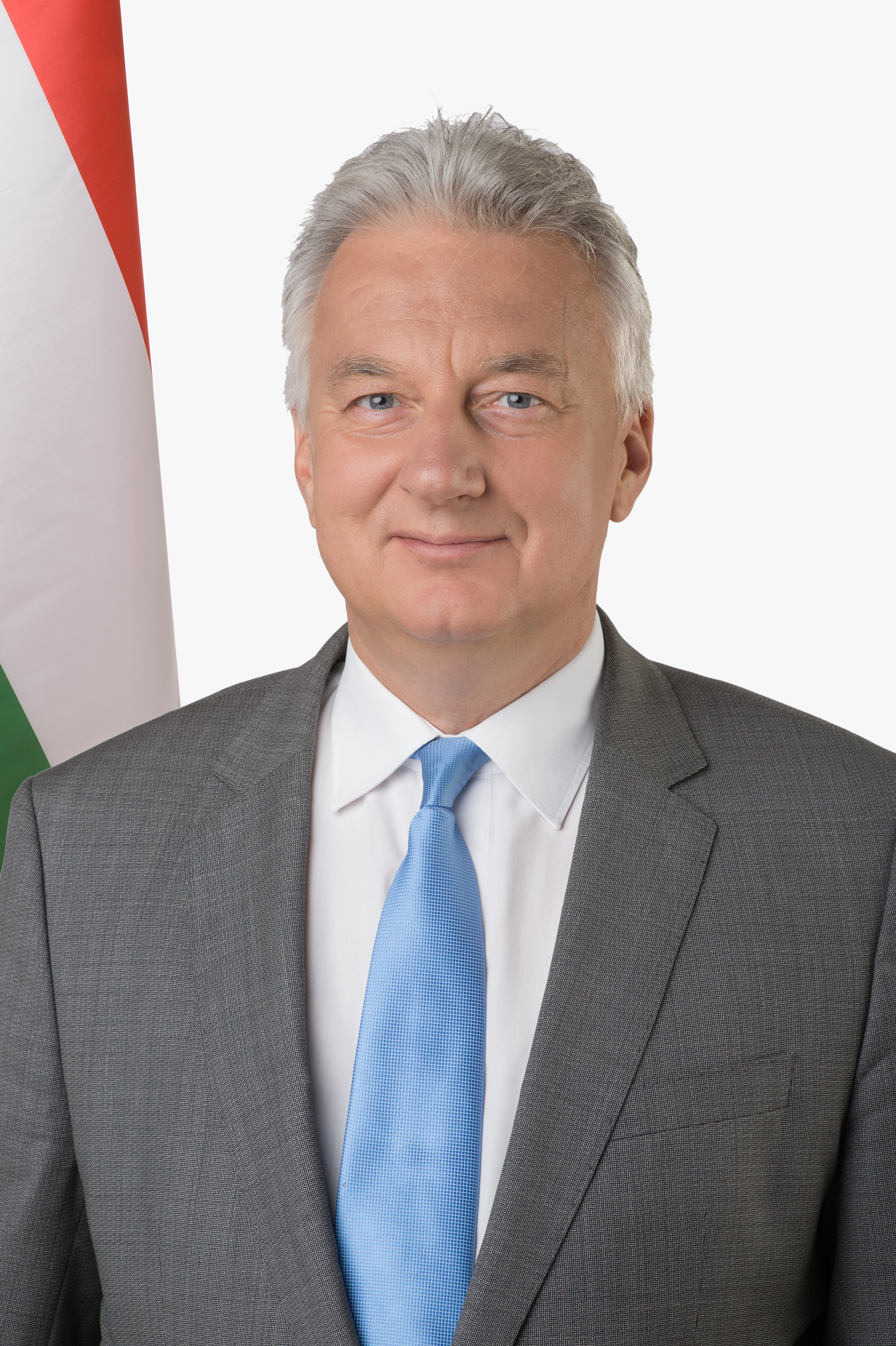
- Official portrait, 2018

Deputy Prime Minister of Hungary
- In office 1 June 2010 – 12 May 2026 Serving with Tibor Navracsics (2010–2014) Sándor Pintér (2018–2022) Mihály Varga (2018–2022)
- Prime Minister: Viktor Orbán
- Succeeded by: Anita Orbán; Bálint Ruff

Minister without portfolio for National Politics, Church Politics and Church Diplomacy
- In office 24 May 2022 – 12 May 2026
- Preceded by: Office established
- Succeeded by: Office abolished

Member of the National Assembly
- In office 15 May 2002 – 8 May 2026
- In office 28 June 1994 – 17 June 1998

Personal details
- Born: 8 August 1962 (age 64) Budapest, Hungary
- Party: KDNP
- Children: 3
- Profession: politician

Zsolt Semjén (Note: Hungarian pronunciation: [ˈʒolt ˈʃɛmjeːn]) (born 8 August 1962) is a Hungarian politician. He was a member of Parliament from 1994 to 1998 and from 2002 to 2026. Since 2003, he has been the chairman of the Christian Democratic People's Party. Between 2022 and 2026, he has been Minister without portfolio and Deputy Prime Minister in the second, third, fourth and fifth cabinets of Prime Minister Viktor Orbán. Semjén became the leader of the Christian Democratic People's Party (KDNP) in 2003 and formed a coalition with Fidesz in 2005.

== Studies ==
After high school Semjén worked in the first half of the 1980s in industrial companies. He studied theology at the Pázmány Péter Catholic University and received a degree in sociology. After that he attended Eötvös Loránd University in Budapest. In the second half of the 90s, he had his theology laureatus degree converted to a doctorate in religious studies, and was given an honorary assistant professorship at the university. In 2014, he obtained an MA degree in wildlife management from the Faculty of Forestry Engineering of the University of West Hungary.

=== Academic misconduct controversy ===
According to an article on 18 November 2012 published by Heti Világgazdaság, Semjén committed acts of academic misconduct, as he allegedly plagiarised around 40% of his 1991 theological doctoral thesis. Some parts of it were resubmitted in his sociology dissertation.

Eötvös Loránd University, which awarded Semjén his degree in sociology, confirmed that there is a significant overlap between the works of Semjén and Molnár. However, they stated that retroactive overriding of the awarding process is unlawful and his degree has not been revoked. Pázmány Péter Catholic University did not conduct an investigation in the case. They announced that they consider the question closed. Semjén has retained his PhD from the institution.

== Political career ==
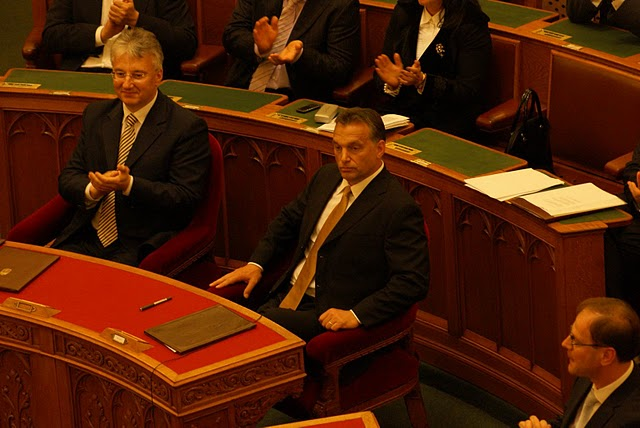
Zsolt Semjén (left), Viktor Orbán and Tibor Navracsics on 29 May 2010 after taking the oath

In 1989, during the political transition, he was one of the founders of the Christian Democratic People's Party. He was a member of the executive committee and employee of the National Assembly. From 1990 to 1994 he served as district councilor. In 1994, he obtained a parliamentary seat and would become the deputy leader of KDNP three years later. After the dissolution of the parliamentary faction of KDNP, he joined the Hungarian Democratic Forum. In 1998, Viktor Orbán gave him the position of secretary of state for the church. During this period, an international church summit was organized in Hungary, the disputes with the Apostolic Holy See were settled, state funding of religious education was restored, an agreement was made with the historical churches, and the funding of church institutions performing public tasks was arranged equal to that of the state. In 2002, Zsolt Semjén returned to parliament from a list of Fidesz and the Democrats.

Soon, he rejoined the extra-parliamentary KDNP and in 2003 became chairman. According to his program, the KDNP has remained an independent party in the Fidesz-led alliance that fully accepts the social doctrines of the Christian churches. Under his leadership, the KDNP formed a cooperation agreement with Fidesz in 2005. Following this, he was re-elected in 2006 and 2010. In the second government of Viktor Orbán he became minister without portfolio and Deputy Prime Minister.

He and his wife represented the Hungarian government at the interment of the heart of former Hungarian Crown Prince Otto in Pannonhalma Archabbey. They were the only persons present who were not Habsburg family members or clerics.

From May 29th of 2010 to May 8th of 2026, he was the deputy prime minister of the second Orbán government, the first and general deputy of the prime minister, and the member of the cabinet responsible for national policy.

On April 6, 2014, he received another mandate from second place in the joint national list of the governing parties. When the government was formed in June, he retained both of his posts - general deputy prime minister and minister without portfolio responsible for national policy.

On April 8, 2018, the Fidesz-Christian Democratic People's Party - for the third time - won the parliamentary elections with a two-thirds majority, gaining another mandate from second place on the national list. In Viktor Orbán's fourth government, he is once again general deputy prime minister, minister of national politics, nationality policy, church politics, and church diplomacy.

During his government activities, he was one of the initiators of declaring Good Friday a public holiday. Zsolt Semjén was the submitter of Act LV of 1993 on Hungarian Citizenship. On November 10, 2017, he announced at the Hungarian Permanent Conference that the one millionth new Hungarian citizen had taken the oath. As a result of the preferential naturalization law, 940,000 people in the Carpathian Basin took the citizenship oath, while 160,000 people in the diaspora received Hungarian citizenship, i.e. 1.1 million became Hungarian citizens in ten years.

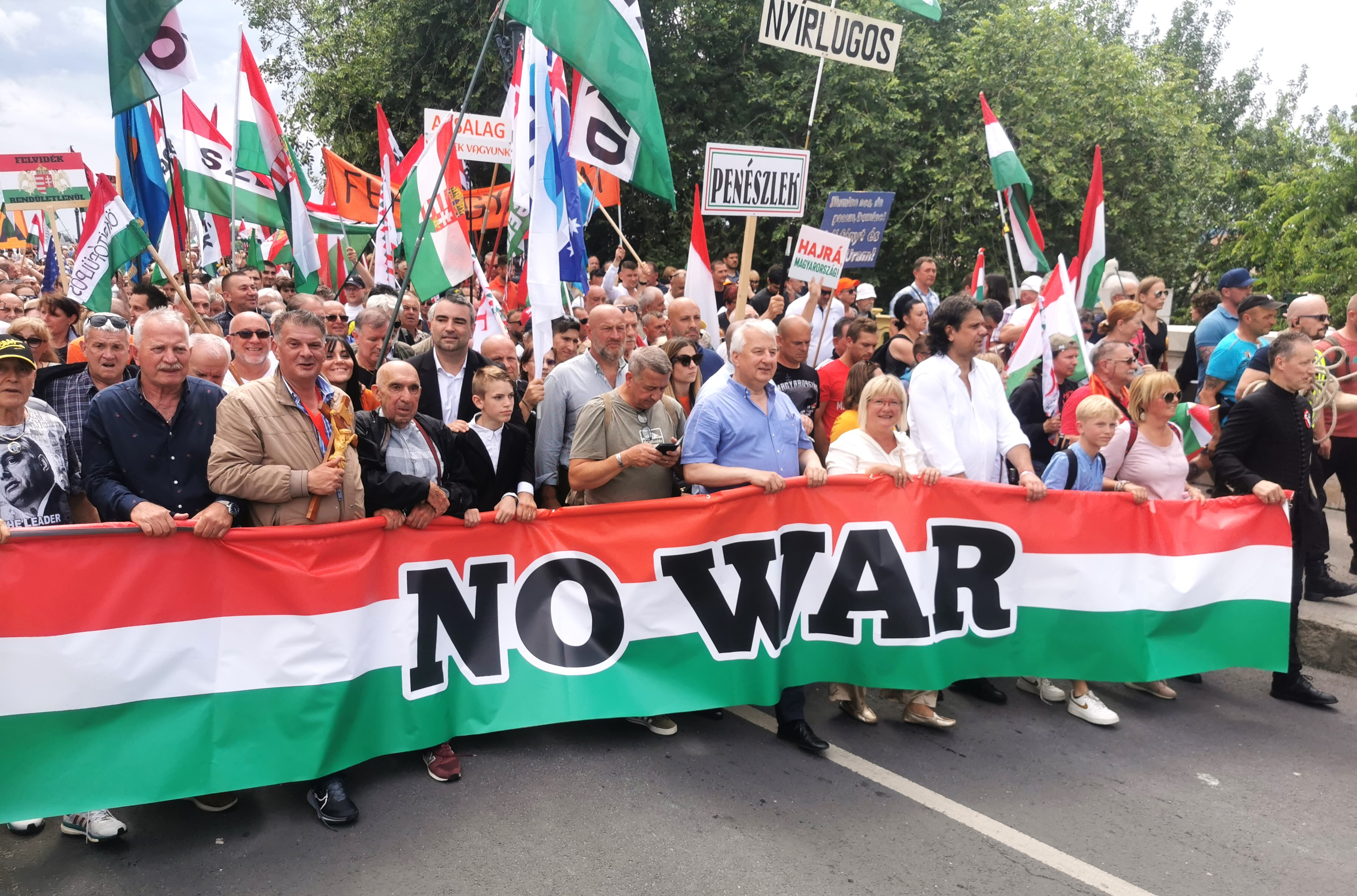
Semjén (behind the "W") at an anti-war demonstration in Budapest

Following the 2026 Hungarian parliamentary election, when Fidesz–KDNP suffered a crushing defeat, Semjén decided not take up his parliamentary seat. He offered to resign as president of KDNP, but the Christian Democrats' presidium outright rejected his resignation.

== Eucharistic congress ==
The International Eucharistic Congress opened in 2021 with the participation of János Áder and Zsolt Semjén. The Deputy Prime Minister also met Pope Francis, who visited Hungary for the event. Deputy Prime Minister Zsolt Semjén, Cardinal Péter Erdő, together with the Archbishop of Esztergom-Budapest, honored Archbishop Gallagher and Cardinal Parolin at the Hungarian Academy in Rome for their work for the Eucharistic Congress.

== World Hunting Exhibition ==
Zsolt Semjén gave the opening speech at the 2021 "ONE WITH NATURE" - World Hunting Exhibition, which was organized in honor of the 50th anniversary of the 1971 World Hunting Exhibition. The politician recommended the organization of the event to the Hungarian hunting community back in September 2011, he announced it at the 2015 FeHoV, and at the 2016 he already announced as a fact that the Government of Hungary also supports the project. The number of visitors to the World Hunting Exhibition set a record. The event lasted twenty days, the central location was visited by a total of 616 thousand people. The rural locations, where the programs were held until the end of 2021, were visited by around 1 million 420 thousand people until October 15. More than 60,000 students participated in the programs at the central location. 514 groups from the country's 386 settlements, 15-16 thousand people from Budapest visited the attractions; moreover, within the framework of the goodwill program, more than 2,300 tickets were requested by organizations helping people with disabilities.

== Pope Francis's apostolic journey to Hungary ==
In February 2023 Matteo Bruni, Director of the Press Office of the Holy See, announced that Pope Francis, accepting an invitation from civic and church dignitaries, would travel to Hungary for an apostolic journey from 28 to 30 April 2023. Representing the Hungarian state, Deputy Prime Minister Zsolt Semjén was responsible for the Pope's visit, which the Hungarian government declared to be a high-priority event.

== Szőlő Street case accusations and political scandal ==
On 8 September 2025, Válasz Online published an interview with Gábor Kuslits, a former official of the Budapest Regional Child Protection Service (Tegyesz), who alleged that Péter Pál Juhász, the former director of the Szőlő Street Juvenile Correction Center (currently under arrest), had facilitated cases of sexual abuse involving politicians and minors from the institution.

In September 2025, an anonymous participant on a podcast hosted by activist Péter Juhász (no relation to Péter Pál Juhász) had claimed that children in another residential home referred to their abuser as "Zsolt bácsi" ("Uncle Zsolt") and later recognised the voice of a senior politician on television. The title of the podcast, Who is Uncle Zsolt?, gained traction on social media.

On 22 September 2025, during a session of the National Assembly, opposition MP Gergely Arató (Democratic Coalition) referenced these allegations by asking Semjén: "Answer, Zsolt Semjén, who is Uncle Zsolti?" Semjén rejected any connection to the allegations, calling them "a character assassination attempt".

According to a statement by the Ministry of Justice, the rumours were being spread as part of a disinformation campaign allegedly linked to journalist Csaba Káncz – who explicitly stated that boys were taken to Zsolt Semjén – based on payments he had received from a foreign company founded by former British intelligence officers between 2012 and 2016. Káncz stated he was unaware that the business intelligence firm was connected to MI6.

The Prosecution Service of Hungary later stated that Kuslits was unable to substantiate his claims during questioning and had not provided verifiable evidence. The Ministry of Justice reported that its investigation found no evidence implicating any member of the government in child abuse or trafficking cases.

The author of the Válasz Online article, András Stumpf, subsequently wrote that even though Semjén had often made moralistic statements himself, he must still be protected from unfounded, rumor-based accusations, as fundamental rights and due process apply universally. Stumpf argued that the "Uncle Zsolt" controversy had grown organically out of systemic failures around the Szőlő Street facility, unanswered questions about oversight, opportunistic interpretations, and disinformation, warning that allowing gossip to replace evidence undermines public trust. Independent outlet 444 likewise noted that the government's communication about the affair had created further confusion, citing inconsistencies in official statements, premature declarations about the case's outcome, unclear investigative scope, and concerns about potential political interference and lack of transparency.

Mandiner, a pro-government media outlet, however, pointed out that the source of the controversy was that the reporter of the original Válasz Online article did not go into details or ask evidence when the politician's name was mentioned, opening gates for speculations.

On 20 January 2026, a man – presumed by 444.hu to be Csaba Káncz – was indicted by the Prosecution Service for the libel of two high-ranking politicians.

In July 2026, a former resident of the Szőlő Street Reformatory, Sándor Bangó, named Semjén as Uncle Zsolti. Bangó had said in previous months that he had been raped as a child by Péter Pál Juhász and Uncle Zsolti. Fidesz-KDNP immediately issued a statement claiming the accusation to be defamation, an absurd lie, and obvious political manipulation.

A further development occurred on 22 September 2026, when prosecutors discontinued proceedings concerning allegations of sexual abuse and exploitation made by Sándor Bangó, a key witness in the Szőlő Street scandal, against the institution's former director, Péter Pál Juhász. According to the prosecutorial decision, Bangó's account contained demonstrably false statements and significant contradictions, and investigators concluded that his allegations concerning Juhász had been fabricated. The decision did not terminate the broader criminal investigation into the former director. Meanwhile, Semjén initiated defamation proceedings against nine individuals over statements linking him to the scandal. At a court hearing on 6 July 2026, one of the defendants apologised, while proceedings against the others continued.

== Notes ==
Political offices
Preceded by Péter Kiss	Deputy Prime Minister of Hungary alongside Tibor Navracsics until 2014; 2010–2026	Succeeded by Anita Orbán
National Assembly of Hungary
Preceded by Tamás Isépy	Leader of the KDNP parliamentary group 2006–2010	Succeeded by Péter Harrach
Party political offices
Preceded by László Varga	President of the KDNP; 2003–	Succeeded by Incumbent
