= Anita Orbán =

Hungarian politician (born 1974)

Anita Orbán MP
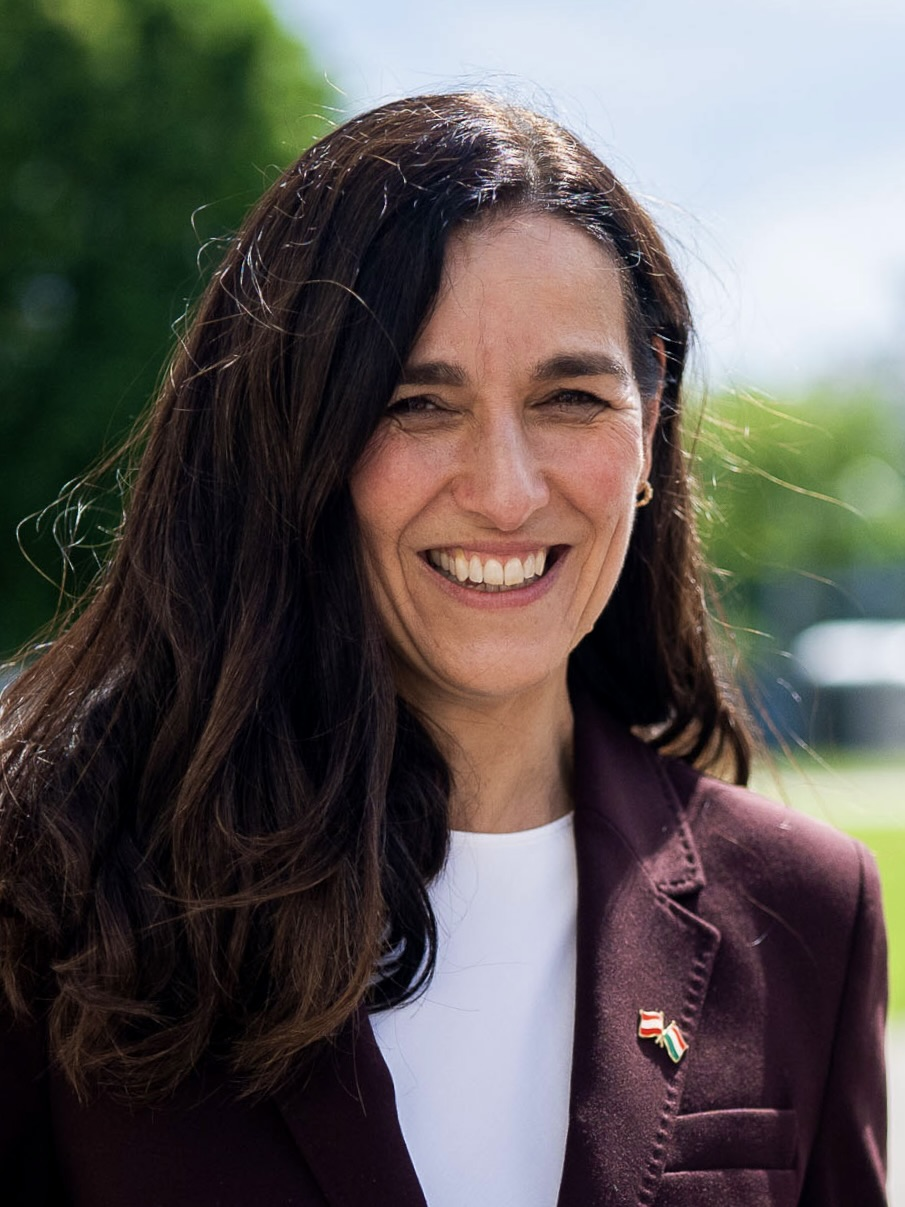
- Orbán in 2026

Deputy Prime Minister of Hungary
- Incumbent
- Assumed office 16 May 2026 Serving with Bálint Ruff (Second Deputy)
- Prime Minister: Péter Magyar
- Preceded by: Zsolt Semjén

Minister of Foreign Affairs
- Incumbent
- Assumed office 13 May 2026
- Prime Minister: Péter Magyar
- Deputy: György László Velkey
- Preceded by: Péter Szijjártó (as Minister of Foreign Affairs and Trade); János Bóka (as Minister for European Union Affairs)

Member of the National Assembly
- Incumbent
- Assumed office 9 May 2026
- Constituency: National list

Personal details
- Born: 3 July 1974 (age 52) Berettyóújfalu, Hungary
- Party: TISZA (since 2026)
- Other political affiliations: Fidesz (until 2015); Independent (2015–2026)
- Spouse: Krisztián Orbán (divorced)
- Children: 3
- Education: Corvinus University of Budapest (BS, MBA); Tufts University (MA, PhD)
- Occupation: Economist; diplomat; politician; business executive

Anita Orbán (born 3 July 1974) is a Hungarian politician and diplomat who has served as deputy prime minister of Hungary and minister of foreign affairs since 2026. In 2026, she was elected a member of the National Assembly and became a leading foreign policy figure of the Tisza Party.

== Early life and education ==
Orbán was born in Berettyóújfalu, where she lived until the age of 18. She then moved to Budapest to pursue her studies. In 1997, she graduated from Corvinus University of Budapest (then University of Economic Sciences) with a bachelor's degree in economics and an MBA, and began her career as a financial controller at Matáv, the predecessor of Magyar Telekom.

She later moved to the United States on scholarship with her then-husband, Krisztián Orbán, where she pursued advanced studies. She earned a master's degree in history from Tufts University in 2001 and both a master's and PhD in international law and diplomacy from the Fletcher School of Law and Diplomacy, becoming in 2007 the first Hungarian to receive a doctorate from the institution.

Her academic work focused on the expansion of Russian and post-Soviet companies into European markets after 1990. She is the author of Power, Energy and the New Russian Imperialism (2008), which examines Russia’s geopolitical ambitions in the energy sector. During her time in the U.S., she also worked as a teaching assistant in international relations.

In the early 2000s, Orbán worked as an editor and later columnist for the Hungarian weekly Heti Válasz, covering foreign policy and public affairs. During this period, she was associated with the foreign policy circle of János Martonyi within Fidesz and frequently appeared at political and academic forums. She was critical of the foreign policy of Prime Minister Ferenc Gyurcsány (2004–2009), especially its perceived unpredictability, and strongly supported diversification of energy sources. She advocated for projects such as the Nabucco gas pipeline and warned early on about Russia's potential use of energy as a geopolitical tool.

== Political career ==
Ahead of the 2010 parliamentary elections, Orbán was nominated as a Fidesz candidate for the Budapest's 16th constituency, but withdrew before the vote, citing health reasons.

Following the election, she joined Hungary's Ministry of Foreign Affairs, serving as Ambassador-at-Large for Energy Security from 2010 to 2015. In this role, she represented Hungary and the Visegrád Group in international forums, including appearances before the European Parliament and the U.S. Congress. She worked under foreign ministers such as János Martonyi, Tibor Navracsics, and Péter Szijjártó.

She also chaired energy cooperation initiatives in the Danube region and served as director of the Constellation Energy Institute, a think tank promoting Central and Eastern European energy cooperation.

Orbán left government service in 2015, amid a broader shift in Hungarian energy policy toward closer cooperation with Russia.

== Business career ==
After leaving diplomacy, Orbán moved to London and entered the energy sector. She worked as a senior advisor at Cheniere Energy's London office and later as Vice President for International Affairs at Tellurian Inc. (2017–2020).

In 2021, she returned to Hungary as Deputy CEO for Corporate Affairs at Vodafone Hungary. Following the company's acquisition, she joined Vodafone Group in London as Director for Public Affairs and ESG. She was also a board member and later chair at the Czech chemical company Draslovka.

== Return to politics ==
On 24 January 2026, Orbán became the foreign affairs leader of the Tisza Party under Péter Magyar. She was elected to the National Assembly on the party's national list in the 2026 parliamentary election and was appointed as Hungary's foreign minister on 12 May 2026.

Her foreign policy platform emphasizes strengthening relations with neighboring countries, restoring ties within the Visegrád Group (particularly Poland), maintaining a constructive relationship with the European Union, and reducing Hungary's dependence on Russian energy.

== Personal life ==
Orbán's former husband is Krisztián Orbán, an economist and founder of the Oriens investment fund. She has three children.

Orbán is a common Hungarian surname; as such, Orbán is unrelated to former Hungarian prime minister Viktor Orbán or Balázs Orbán, another prominent Fidesz politician.

Political offices
Preceded by Zsolt Semjén	Deputy Prime Minister of Hungary; 2026–present	Incumbent
Preceded by Péter Szijjártó	Minister of Foreign Affairs; 2026–present	Incumbent
