= Márta Görög =

Hungarian politician (born 1975)

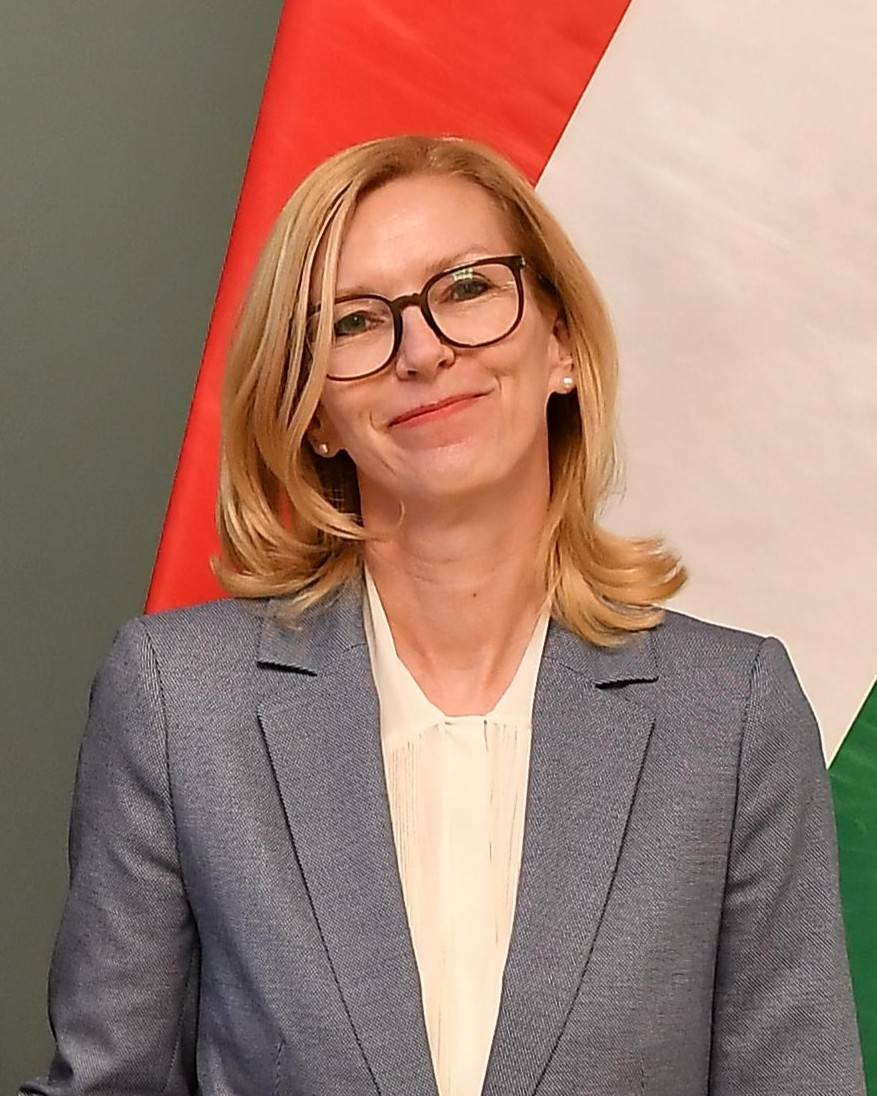
- Görög in 2026

Minister of Justice
- Incumbent
- Assumed office 13 May 2026
- Prime Minister: Péter Magyar
- Preceded by: Bence Tuzson

Personal details
- Born: 31 March 1975 (age 51)
- Party: Independent (affiliated with TISZA)

Márta Görög (born 31 March 1975) is a Hungarian politician who has been nominated to serve as minister of justice in the Magyar Government. She has served as dean of the faculty of law and political sciences of the University of Szeged since 2019.

== Early life and career ==
Márta Görög completed her secondary education in the advanced German–Russian language program at the Móra Ferenc Secondary School. She graduated from the Faculty of Law at the University of Szeged in 1998. She earned her Ph.D. in 2007 and completed her habilitation in 2014.

Görög became a trainee lawyer in 1995. In 2001, she joined the Department of Civil Law and Civil Procedure at the University of Szeged as an assistant lecturer, later serving as assistant professor and associate professor. Since 2016, she has headed the university's Institute of Civil Sciences. She holds the rank of full professor.

In 2019, Görög was appointed dean of the Faculty of Law at the University of Szeged, becoming both the first woman and the youngest person to lead the faculty.

On 13 May 2026, she became Minister of Justice in the Government of Hungary.

Görög is a member of the Presidium of the Hungarian Lawyers' Association and of the Committee on Legal and Political Sciences of the Hungarian Academy of Sciences.

== Personal life ==
Görög established a higher education scholarship at her former school, Móra Ferenc Secondary School, in memory of her parents.

Her husband is attorney Tamás Törőcsik. They have two daughters.
