= Judit Lannert =

Hungarian politician (born 1962)

- Lannert in 2026

Minister of Children and Education
- Incumbent
- Assumed office 13 May 2026
- Prime Minister: Péter Magyar
- Preceded by: Sándor Pintér (as Minister of Interior)

Personal details
- Born: Judit Orsolya Lannert; 1962 (age 63–64)
- Party: Independent (affiliated with TISZA)

Judit Orsolya Lannert (born 1962) is a Hungarian academic who has been serving as minister of children and education in the Magyar Government since 13 May 2026. She previously served as deputy director of research of the Institute for Educational Research and Development.

== Education ==
She obtained her first degree in economics at the Karl Marx University of Economic Sciences in 1985. She earned a Master of Arts degree in social politics at the Faculty of Humanities of Eötvös Loránd University in 1990. She obtained a PhD degree in sociology at the Corvinus University of Budapest in 2005.

== Personal life ==
She has a husband and children.
