= Bálint Ruff =

Hungarian politician (born 1981)

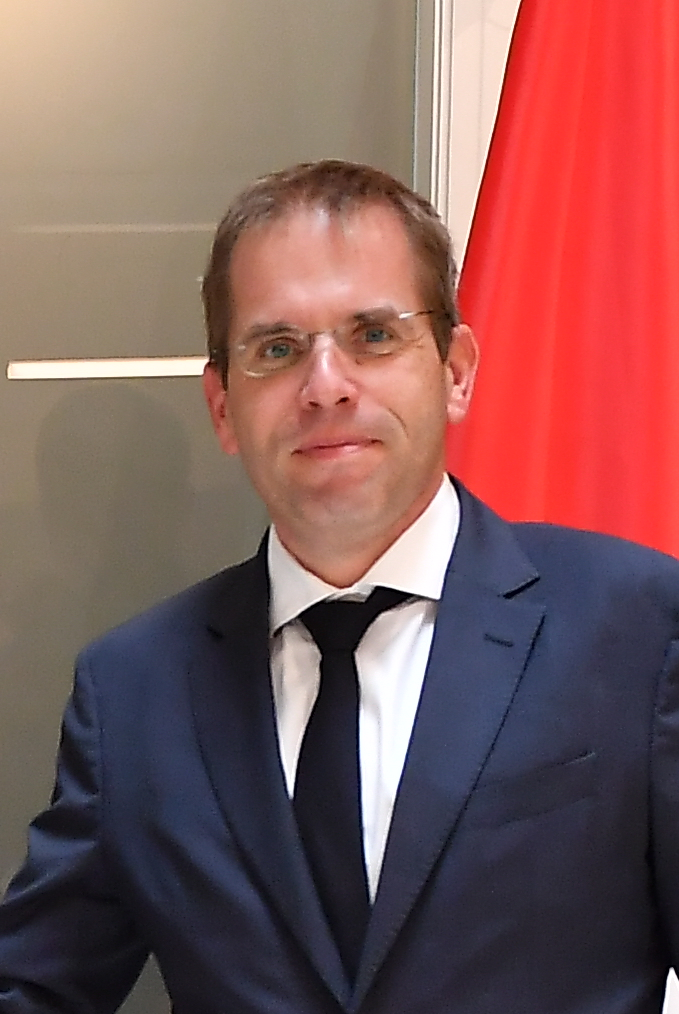
- Ruff in 2026

Deputy Prime Minister of Hungary
- Incumbent
- Assumed office 19 May 2026 Serving with Anita Orbán (First Deputy)
- Prime Minister: Péter Magyar
- Preceded by: Zsolt Semjén

Minister of the Prime Minister's Office
- Incumbent
- Assumed office 13 May 2026
- Prime Minister: Péter Magyar
- Deputy: Bence Csontos
- Preceded by: Gergely Gulyás

Personal details
- Born: Bálint György Ruff; 1981 (age 44–45)
- Party: Independent (affiliated with TISZA)
- Children: 3
- Education: Eötvös Loránd University (JD); Pázmány Péter Catholic University (BA)
- Occupation: Lawyer; presenter; politician

Bálint György Ruff (born 1981) is a Hungarian lawyer, television presenter, political analyst, and politician. He has served as deputy prime minister of Hungary and Minister of the Prime Minister's Office in the Magyar Government since its formation in May 2026. He formerly hosted the political analysis show Vétó on Partizán.

== Education ==
Bálint György Ruff obtained a law degree at the Faculty of Law of Pázmány Péter Catholic University, while simultaneously studying philosophy at Eötvös Loránd University. During his studies, he was affiliated with the Bibó István College for Advanced Studies.

== Career ==
He began his career as a lawyer, working in law firms between 2003 and 2005. From 2006, he worked at the Prime Minister's Office, assisting State Secretary Gábor Horn, and between 2007 and 2008 he served as chief of staff at the Ministry of Environment and Water. At the same time, he participated in Hungary's climate strategy project, where he was responsible for coordinating communication between governmental and professional stakeholders.

Between 2008 and 2009, he worked as a policy and communication advisor for a political party, and from July 2009 he continued as a freelance consultant. In 2013, he founded Invisible Hand Coaching & Consulting, a company providing strategic and communication advisory services.

As a founder and volunteer, he took part in the Tűzraktár cultural project (2003–2006), and also worked pro bono as a lawyer for the Kék Vonal Child Crisis Foundation (2014–2015).

As a political advisor, he worked with multiple parties and municipalities on strategy and political communication. Between 2014 and 2024, he advised several mayors, including Ottó Dóra, András Pikó, and László Botka. In 2017, he led Botka's prime ministerial campaign. After the campaign, from November 2017 he worked as a senior municipal advisor in Szeged.

He participated in organizing opposition cooperation and advised Péter Márki-Zay in his political activities.

He became widely known through his media appearances. Between 2021 and 2024, he hosted podcasts on platforms operated by Radio Free Europe/Radio Liberty and Magyar Jeti Zrt. From May 2023 to April 2026, he was the editor and host of the political program Vétó on Partizán.

Since 2022, he has been a lecturer at the Bibó István College for Advanced Studies.

From May 2026, he has been serving as the Minister of the Prime Minister's Office and one of the deputy prime ministers in the government of Péter Magyar.

== Personal life ==
He is married and has three children.
