= Viktória Lőrincz =

Hungarian politician

Minister of Regional and Rural Development
- Incumbent
- Assumed office 13 May 2026
- Prime Minister: Péter Magyar
- Preceded by: Tibor Navracsics (as Minister for Regional Development and Public Administration)

Member of the National Assembly
- Incumbent
- Assumed office 9 May 2026
- Preceded by: Attila Gelencsér
- Constituency: Somogy 1st

Personal details
- Party: TISZA

Viktória Lőrincz is a Hungarian politician who was elected member of the National Assembly in 2026. She has been nominated to serve as minister of rural development in the Magyar Government.
