= Zsolt Hegedűs =

Hungarian politician (born 1969)

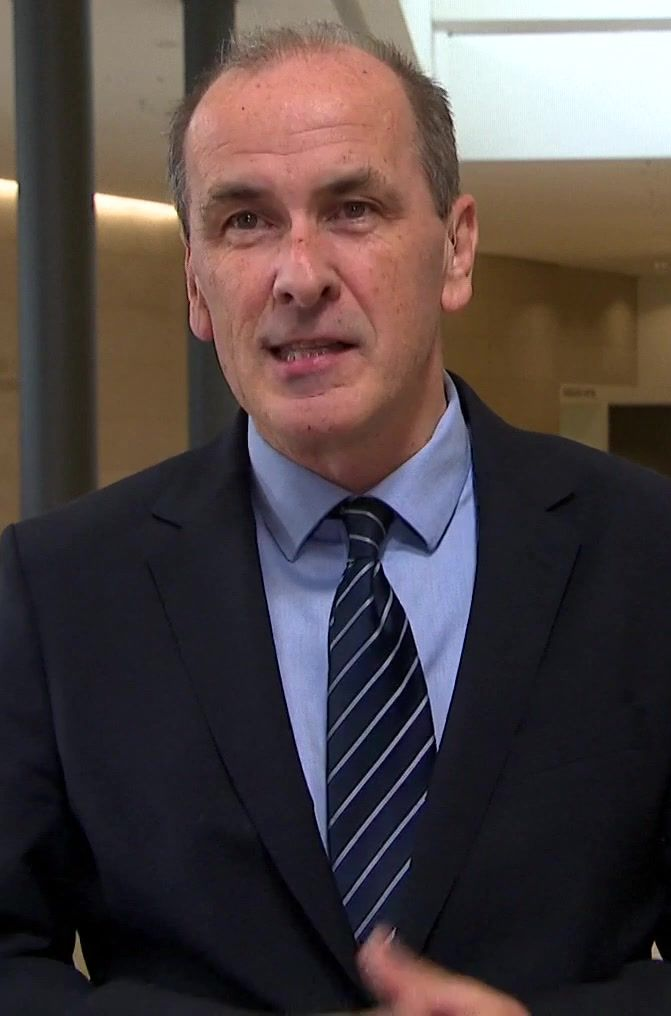
- Hegedűs in 2026

Minister of Health
- Incumbent
- Assumed office 13 May 2026
- Prime Minister: Péter Magyar
- Preceded by: Péter Takács (as State Secretary of Healthcare)

Member of the National Assembly
- Incumbent
- Assumed office 9 May 2026
- Constituency: National list

Personal details
- Born: Zsolt Csaba Hegedűs; 11 October 1969 (age 56)
- Citizenship: Hungary; United Kingdom
- Party: TISZA
- Relations: Loránt Hegedűs Sr. (father)
- Education: Semmelweis University
- Occupation: Surgeon, politician
- Profession: Orthopaedic surgeon

Zsolt Csaba Hegedűs (Note: Hungarian pronunciation: [ˈʒolt ˈhɛɡɛdyːʃ]) (born 11 October 1969) is a Hungarian politician and orthopaedic surgeon who has served as Minister of Health since 2026. He was elected a member of the National Assembly in the 2026 Hungarian parliamentary election on the national list of the Tisza Party.

== Medical career ==
Hegedűs graduated from Semmelweis University Faculty of Medicine in 1994 and qualified as an orthopaedic specialist in 1999.

Between 2005 and 2015, Hegedűs worked in the United Kingdom's National Health Service (NHS). He served as the Clinical Lead and Head of the Orthopaedic Department at North Manchester General Hospital, and later as the Lead Surgeon for Day Surgery at the Cirencester Treatment Centre, specializing in high-volume hip and knee replacements and arthroscopic procedures.

Upon returning to Hungary in 2015, he continued his clinical practice at the Wáberer Medical Center and the Duna Medical Center, while maintaining his professional ties to the UK. He also served as a chief physician in the Sports Surgery and Orthopaedics Department of the National Institute for Sports Medicine (Sportkórház).

== Healthcare Advocacy and Ethics ==
Hegedűs became a prominent public figure as one of the leaders of the 1001 orvos hálapénz nélkül ("1001 doctors without gratuity payments") campaign, which fought to eliminate the systemic use of informal cash payments in Hungarian healthcare. He was also a vice-president of the Rezidensek és Szakorvosok Szakszervezete (ReSzaSz), a union for medical residents and specialists.

From 2019 to 2023, he served as the President of the Ethics Collegium of the Magyar Orvosi Kamara (Hungarian Medical Chamber). During the COVID-19 pandemic in Hungary, he coordinated the chamber's ethical guidelines regarding the allocation of scarce medical resources and advocated for increased patient safety and hospital hygiene standards to prevent hospital-acquired infections.

== Political career ==
In July 2025, Hegedűs was introduced as the chief healthcare expert for the Tisza Party. On 30 October 2025, party leader Péter Magyar officially confirmed that Hegedűs would be the health minister in a future Tisza-led government.

In the 2026 parliamentary election, he was placed 11th on the party's national list and was elected to the National Assembly. Following the election victory, he gained media attention for his "victory dance" on stage, which went viral and earned him the nickname "Bulibáró" (Party Baron) in the Hungarian press. He repeated his dance after the election of Péter Magyar as Prime Minister of Hungary.

== Personal life ==
Hegedűs is married to an ophthalmologist and has four children. He has stated that his return to Hungary from the UK was motivated by a desire to contribute to the improvement of his home country's healthcare system for future generations.

Hegedűs comes from a notable conservative family. His father was calvinist bishop Loránt Hegedűs Sr.. His brother is Lóránt Hegedűs Jr. who served as Hungarian Justice and Life Party member of the National Assembly from 1998 and 2002, just like his sister-in-law Lórántné Hegedűs as Jobbik member from 2010 to 2019.
