= Szabolcs Bóna =

Hungarian politician (born 1975)

Minister of Agriculture and Food
- Incumbent
- Assumed office 13 May 2026
- Prime Minister: Péter Magyar
- Preceded by: István Nagy

Personal details
- Born: Szabolcs János Bóna; 1975 (age 50–51) Csorna, Hungary
- Party: TISZA
- Education: Széchenyi István University

Szabolcs János Bóna (born 1975) is a Hungarian farmer and politician who has been serving as minister of agriculture and food since 2026 in the Magyar Government. In 2022, he was awarded Livestock Farmer of the Year by Agrotrend Csoport. In 2024, he was awarded the Sustainable Agriculture Award of the Year by Portfolio Csoport.
