= János Martonyi =

Hungarian politician

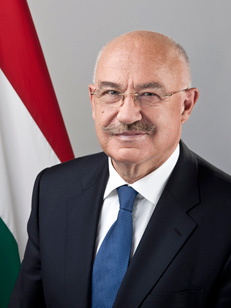
- Official portrait, 2011

Minister of Foreign Affairs
- In office 29 May 2010 – 6 June 2014
- Prime Minister: Viktor Orban
- Preceded by: Péter Balázs
- Succeeded by: Tibor Navracsics
- In office 8 July 1998 – 27 May 2002
- Prime Minister: Viktor Orban
- Preceded by: László Kovács
- Succeeded by: László Kovács

Personal details
- Born: 5 April 1944 (age 82) Kolozsvár, Kingdom of Hungary
- Party: MSZMP; Fidesz
- Spouse: Rozália Rábai
- Children: Zoltán; Zsuzsanna
- Profession: diplomat, lawyer, politician

János Martonyi (born 5 April 1944) is a Hungarian politician, who served as Minister of Foreign Affairs from 1998 to 2002 and from 2010 to 2014. He is a member of the Fidesz – Hungarian Civic Union party. He was part of the Amato Group that unofficially drafted a new treaty for the European Union after the European Constitution was rejected by the French and Dutch voters.

== Political career ==
He was a member of the Hungarian Socialist Workers' Party (MSZMP) which he entered in 1988, which later he declared as a personal mistake.

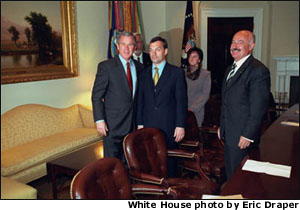
János Martonyi (right) with George W. Bush and Viktor Orbán in the White House.

On 29 May 2010 he was reappointed as Minister of Foreign Affairs. His most prominent tasks were the development of a strong and effective foreign policy, and planning for Hungarian Presidency of the European Union from January to July 2011. He visited Slovakia before his inauguration on the occasion of the passing of the Hungarian law allowing citizenship to be given to Hungarians living in neighboring countries. The Slovak government has considered the new law to be an aggressive move, with insufficient negotiation between the two countries. Martonyi said that hysteria in Slovakia is a result of the election campaign there.

Martonyi's foreign policy's motto was a quote from 17th-century poet Miklós Zrínyi: "Don't hurt the Hungarian!"

His first visit abroad was to Serbia. Martonyi mentioned the improved relations between the two countries. He said that Hungary has to help Serbia join the European Union. Martonyi met Vuk Jeremić who said the Hungarian EU Presidency will be very important for the integration of the Western Balkan countries. The Hungarian foreign minister also met Prime Minister Mirko Cvetković and President Boris Tadić.

At the end of the Hungarian Presidency of the European Union he said "the past six months of Hungary’s EU presidency demonstrated that Europe was able to function and react to challenges, even if sometimes slowly and unevenly". Martonyi noted that number of integration issues has resolved during EU presidency, including EU enlargement, the approval of the Roma Framework Strategy and the Danube Strategy, completion of accession negotiations with Croatia, as well as progress towards the admission of Romania and Bulgaria to the Schengen zone.

== Memberships ==
Martonyi is a member of the European Academy of Sciences and Arts, the Board of MOL and the Wilfred Marten Centre for European Studies.

== Awards ==
Martonyi was awarded the National Order of Merit of France in 2000 and the Central Cross of the Order of the Republic of Hungary with Star in 2003. In 2016, he won the Széchenyi Prize and the Rising Sun Order of Merit. He won the Hungarian Corvin Chain in 2018 and the Civic Hungary Award in 2024.

Political offices
Preceded by László Kovács	Minister of Foreign Affairs; 1998–2002	Succeeded by László Kovács
Preceded by Péter Balázs	Minister of Foreign Affairs; 2010–2014	Succeeded by Tibor Navracsics
Preceded by Steven Vanackere	President of the Council of the European Union; 2011	Succeeded by Radosław Sikorski
