= István Kapitány =

Hungarian executive and politician

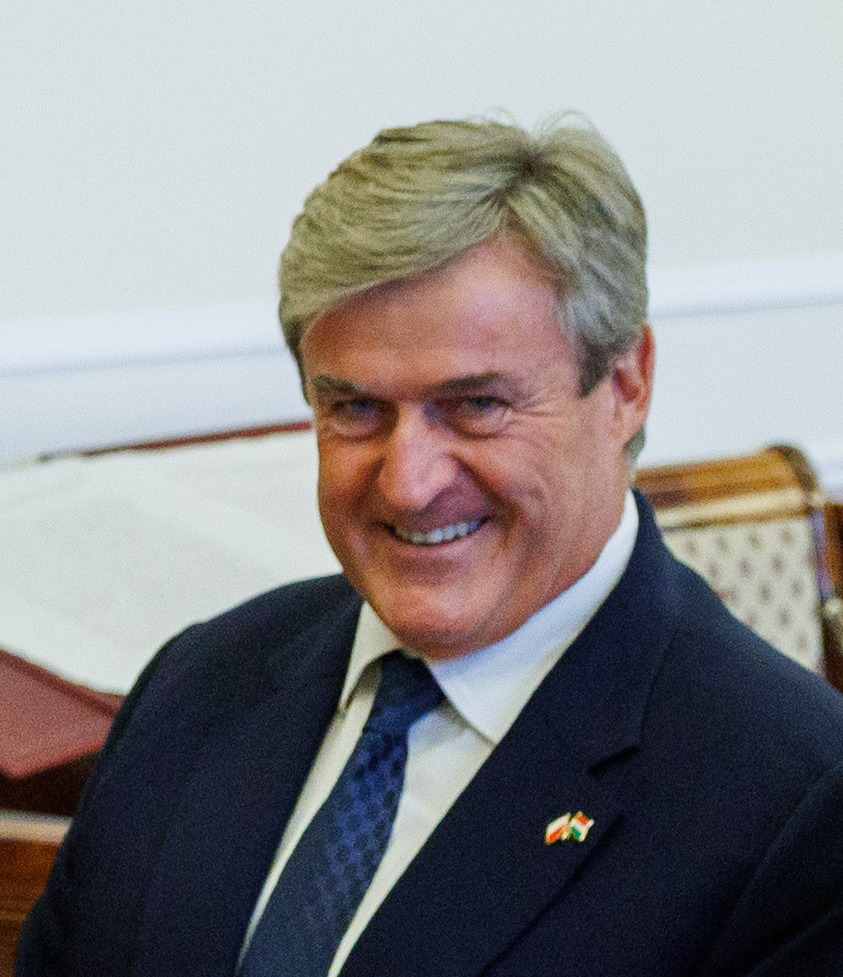
- Kapitány in 2026

Minister of Economy and Energy
- Incumbent
- Assumed office 13 May 2026
- Prime Minister: Péter Magyar
- Deputy: Áron Porcher
- Preceded by: Márton Nagy (as Minister for National Economy); Csaba Lantos (as Minister of Energy)

Member of the National Assembly
- Incumbent
- Assumed office 9 May 2026
- Constituency: National list

Personal details
- Born: Debrecen, Hungary
- Party: Tisza (since 2026)
- Education: Budapest Business School
- Occupation: Business executive

István Kapitány is a Hungarian politician and retired business executive who has served as the Minister of Economy and Energy of Hungary since 2026.

Prior to entering Hungarian politics with the Tisza Party in 2026, Kapitány worked for Shell in various executive positions, primarily in the United Kingdom. He was Shell’s Global Executive Vice President from 2014 to 2024. His roles prior to this included serving as president of Shell Hungary and president of Shell Commercial Fuels and Lubricants for the Americas in Houston, Texas.

== Early life and education ==
Kapitány was born in Debrecen, in the Hungarian People's Republic. His father, also named István, was a chief pilot for Malév Hungarian Airlines who died piloting Malév Flight 355 in 1962. His family later ran a spice store, where he had his first job.

Kapitány is a graduate of the Budapest Business School.

== Career ==
After completing his compulsory military service, he worked as a deputy store manager in a kitchenware store in the SUGÁR shopping center in Budapest in the late 1980s. In 1987, at the age of 25, he met the head of the network of Interag Rt., an IMPEX company and then a Hungarian subsidiary of Shell, who commissioned him with a supermarket construction project. Shell Interag's first store opened in 1988 in Székesfehérvár, along the M7 motorway. Until 1991, he was head of Shell Interag's merchandise department. In the early 1990s, he moved to London as a business consultant, where he was responsible for developing a network of petrol station shops. In 1993, he moved to South Africa, first as head of the commercial department at Shell South Africa, then a year later as regional director. In Johannesburg, he was also responsible for the franchise system. He then became retail director for Central and Eastern Europe, Greece, and Turkey.

From 2004 to 2006, he was retail manager for Germany, Austria, Switzerland, and Poland. From 1 December 2012, he worked in Houston as president of Shell's fuels and lubricants business for North and Latin America.

In 2014, he became Shell's Global Executive Vice President, based in London, where he was responsible for 45,000 gas stations and nearly 500,000 employees in 85 countries. Unlike his predecessors, he was constantly on the road, personally visiting foreign interests. He came up with the idea for the Shell V-Power fuel range and the introduction of the Clubsmart loyalty program. He spent 10 years in this position before retiring in 2024.

Since January 2026, he has been the economic development and energy expert of the Tisza Party. On 20 April, Péter Magyar announced that Kapitány will be serving as Minister of Economy and Energetics in his cabinet.

== Recognition ==
In 2023, he was awarded the Officer's Cross of the Order of Merit of Hungary.
