= Tibor Navracsics =

Hungarian politician

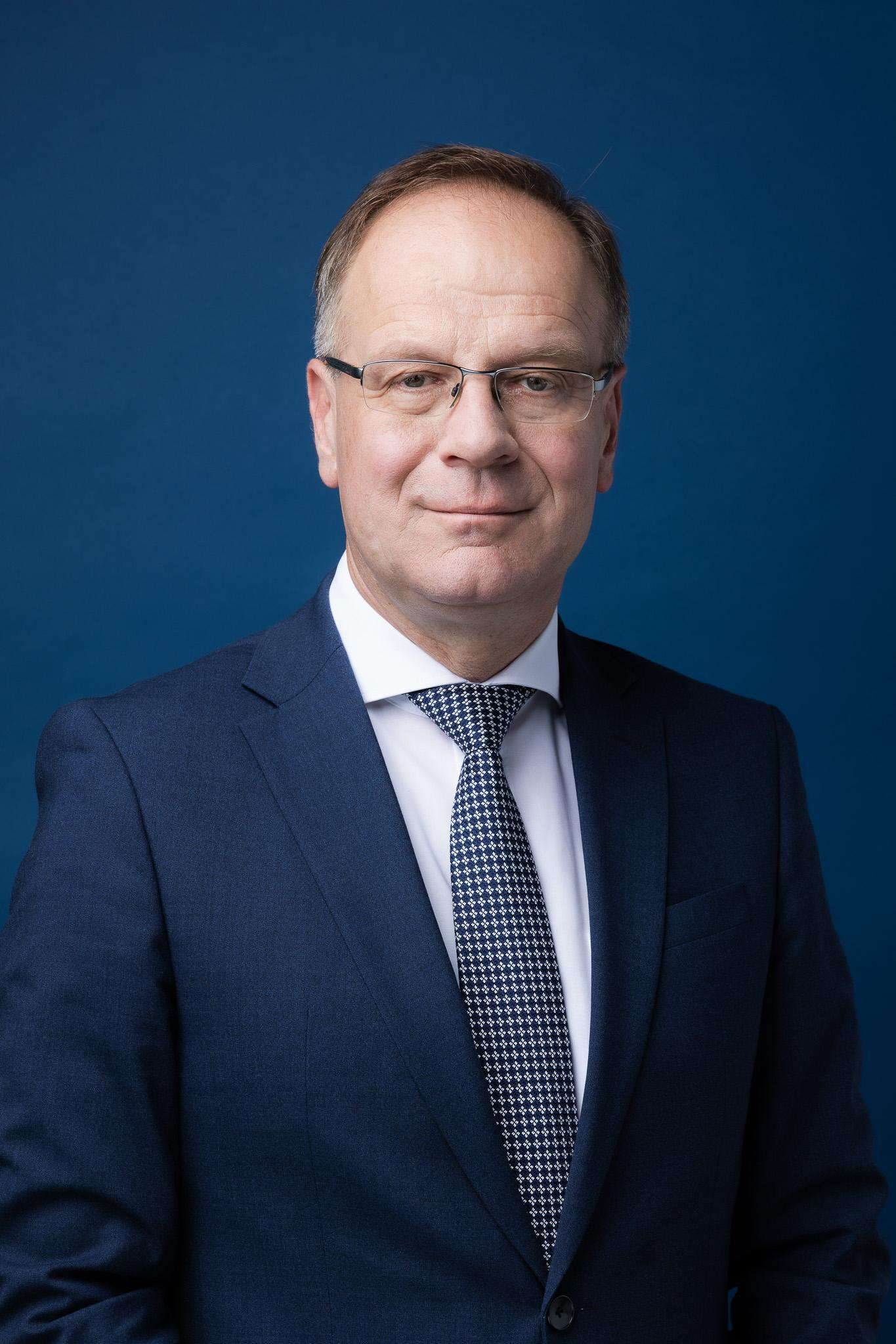
- Official portrait, 2023

Minister for Regional Development and Public Administration
- In office 24 May 2022 – 9 May 2026
- Prime Minister: Viktor Orbán
- Preceded by: Office established
- Succeeded by: Viktória Lőrincz (as Minister of Rural and Regional Development)

Deputy Prime Minister of Hungary
- In office 2 June 2010 – 6 June 2014; Served alongside Zsolt Semjén
- Prime Minister: Viktor Orbán
- Preceded by: Péter Kiss
- Succeeded by: Zsolt Semjén

European Commissioner for Education, Culture, Youth and Sport
- In office 1 November 2014 – 30 November 2019
- Commission: Juncker
- Preceded by: Androulla Vassiliou
- Succeeded by: Mariya Gabriel

Minister of Foreign Affairs and Trade
- In office 6 June – 23 September 2014
- Prime Minister: Viktor Orbán
- Preceded by: János Martonyi
- Succeeded by: Péter Szijjártó

Minister of Public Administration and Justice
- In office 29 May 2010 – 6 June 2014
- Prime Minister: Viktor Orbán
- Preceded by: Imre Forgács
- Succeeded by: László Trócsányi

Member of the National Assembly
- Incumbent
- Assumed office 2 May 2022
- In office 16 May 2006 – 31 October 2014

Personal details
- Born: 13 June 1966 (age 60) Veszprém, Hungary
- Party: Fidesz (1994–present)
- Other political affiliations: KDNP (2022–present)
- Spouse: Anikó Prevoz
- Children: 3
- Education: Eötvös Loránd University

Tibor Navracsics (born 13 June 1966) is a Hungarian politician who served as Minister of Foreign Affairs and Trade from June to September 2014. He previously served as Minister of Administration and Justice between 2010 and 2014. He is a member of the Christian Democratic People's Party and was the European Commissioner for Education, Culture, Youth and Sport in the Juncker Commission. Between 2022 and 2026, he has been the Minister of Regional Development of Hungary.

== Career ==
Navracsics was elected in Veszprém County 1st constituency in 2018 and 2022.

== Education ==
Navracsics holds a degree in law (Eötvös Loránd University 1990) and a higher degree as judge (1992). He also received a PhD in political science at the Faculty of Law of the Eötvös Loránd University in 1999.

== Career ==
- 1990–1992: Municipal Court, City of Veszprém – Tribunal Clerk;
- 1992–1993: Regional Assembly of Veszprém County – Research Fellow;
- 1993–1997: University of Economics, Budapest, Department of Political Sciences – Assistant Lecturer;
- 1997–1999: Department of Political Sciences – Senior Lecturer
- 1999–2001: Department of Political Sciences – Associate Professor
- 1998–1999: Prime Minister's Office, Communications Department – Head of Department, (Viktor Orbán's Cabinet);
- 1999–2002: Prime Minister's Office, Department for Press and Information – Head of Department;
- 2002–2003: Parliamentary Group of Fidesz – Hungarian Civic Union, Head of Department for Political Analyses;
- 2003–2006: Fidesz – Hungarian Civic Union, Chief of President's Cabinet;
- 2004– : Leader of the program-creating team, referred to as "Civic Governance";
- 2006– : Member of Parliament
- 2001– : Department of Political Sciences Eötvös Loránd University – Senior Associate Professor
- 2006–2010: Fidesz – Hungarian Civic Union – Leader of the Fraction
- The Congress of Fidesz in May, 2007, has accepted his (Navracsics's) polemical essay "Our Future";
- Member of the Political Sciences Association
- 2010–2014: Minister of Public Administration and Justice
- 2014: Minister of Foreign Affairs and Trade
- 2014–2019: European Commissioner for Education, Culture, Youth and Sport
- 2022–2024: Minister for Regional Development
- 2024: Minister for Public Administration and Regional Development

== Professional experiences ==
- 1990–1992: Department of Social Sciences at the University of Veszprém – Lecturer;
- 1992–1998: Dániel Berzsenyi Teacher's College, Szombathely – Department of Sociology and Political Sciences – Lecturer;
- 1992–1993: Periodical Comitatus – Editor;
- 1997–2000: Secretary General of the Hungarian Association of Political Scientists;
- 1996– : Vice-President, Association of the Hungarian Institute for Political Science;
- 1999– : Member of the Editorial Board, Politikatudományi Szemle (Political Science Review);
- 2001– : Member of the Presidency, Hungarian Association of Political Science

== Publications ==
- Európai belpolitika (Internal Politics in the European Union). Budapest: Korona, 1998
- Political Analysis of the European Union, Bp., Korona, 1998
- Political Communication, 2004 (co-author: István Hegedűs-Szilágyi-Mihály Gál-Balázs Sipos)

== Field of research ==
Navracsics's field of research are comparative politics and internal politics in the European Union. Because he speaks Serbo-Croatian, he wrote a number of analyses regarding the former Yugoslavia.

== Notable facts ==
- At the invitation of the presidency he wrote about the ground values of the party a manifesto, after he organized several public debates on the topics of living standards, competitiveness, public services and justice. The manifesto was accepted by the 2007 Congress of the Fidesz – Hungarian Civic Union.
- He was elected "Teacher of the Year 2007" by the students of ELTE.
- On 6 October 2014, the European Parliament proposed to reject him as EU commissioner-designate since he was found unsuitable for the post related to citizenship. Instead he was given the portfolio for Education, Culture, Youth and Sport.

National Assembly of Hungary
Preceded by János Áder	Leader of Fidesz in the National Assembly; 2006–2010	Succeeded by János Lázár
Political offices
Preceded by Péter Kiss	Deputy Prime Minister of Hungary; 2010–2014; Served alongside: Zsolt Semjén	Succeeded by Zsolt Semjén
Preceded by Imre Forgács	Minister of Public Administration and Justice; 2010–2014	Succeeded by László Trócsányi
Preceded by Tamás Fellegi	Minister of National Development; Acting; 2011	Succeeded by Zsuzsanna Németh
Preceded by János Martonyi	Minister of Foreign Affairs and Trade; 2014	Succeeded by Péter Szijjártó
Preceded by László Andor	Hungarian European Commissioner; 2014–2019	Succeeded by Olivér Várhelyi
Preceded by Androulla Vassiliou as European Commissioner for Education, Culture, Multilingualism and Youth	European Commissioner for Education, Culture, Youth and Sport; 2014–2019	Succeeded by Mariya Gabriel as European Commissioner for Innovation, Research, Culture, Education and Youth
Preceded by Office established	Minister for Regional Development and Public Administration; 2022–2026	Succeeded by Viktória Lőrincz
