= Görög =

Görög (Hungarian: [ˈgørøg]) is a surname of Hungarian origins which means Greek. Notable people with the surname include:

- Ibolya Görög (born 1947), Hungarian etiquette coach & expert, honorary associate professor (docent, reader), former chief of protocol of Hungary at the Prime Minister's Office
- László Görög (disambiguation), several people
- Márta Görög (born 1975), Hungarian politician
- Zita Görög (born 1979), Hungarian actress and model
