= Hold Street Marketplace =

Coordinates: 47.5048865°N 19.0531109°E

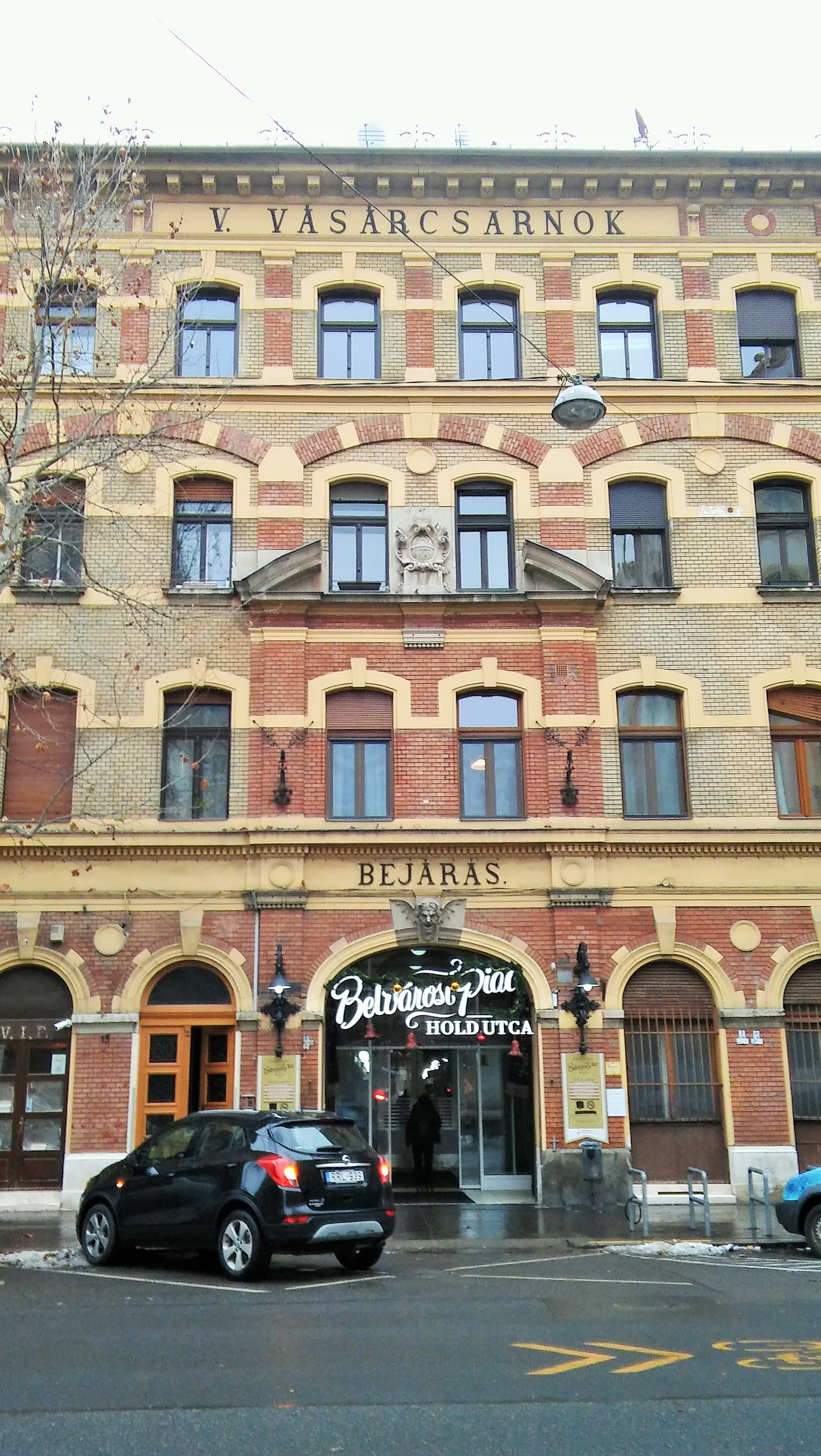

The Hold Street Marketplace or Market Hall V, now officially known as Downtown Market, is one of the six great Budapest market halls built under the monarchy in Hungary.

The building between Moon Street and Vadász Street in the 5th District was built between 1892 and 1896 as the No. 5 marketplace by Győző Czigler, who designed two of the six market halls built in Budapest in that period. The 2107 m^{2} eclectic-style hall had 190 permanent and 80 temporary stores, as well as police and rescue rooms, a coffee shop, a fairgrounds, and a restaurant and a meat test room.

The hall opened in February 1897, at the same time as the Great Market Hall and three other district market halls; together with the Great Market Hall, it was the most popular of the new halls.

In 2014, the Market Hall was renovated and renamed the Downtown Market. Today it operates primarily as a produce market, and in the years after the renovation it was also known for its street-food stalls.

== Gallery ==
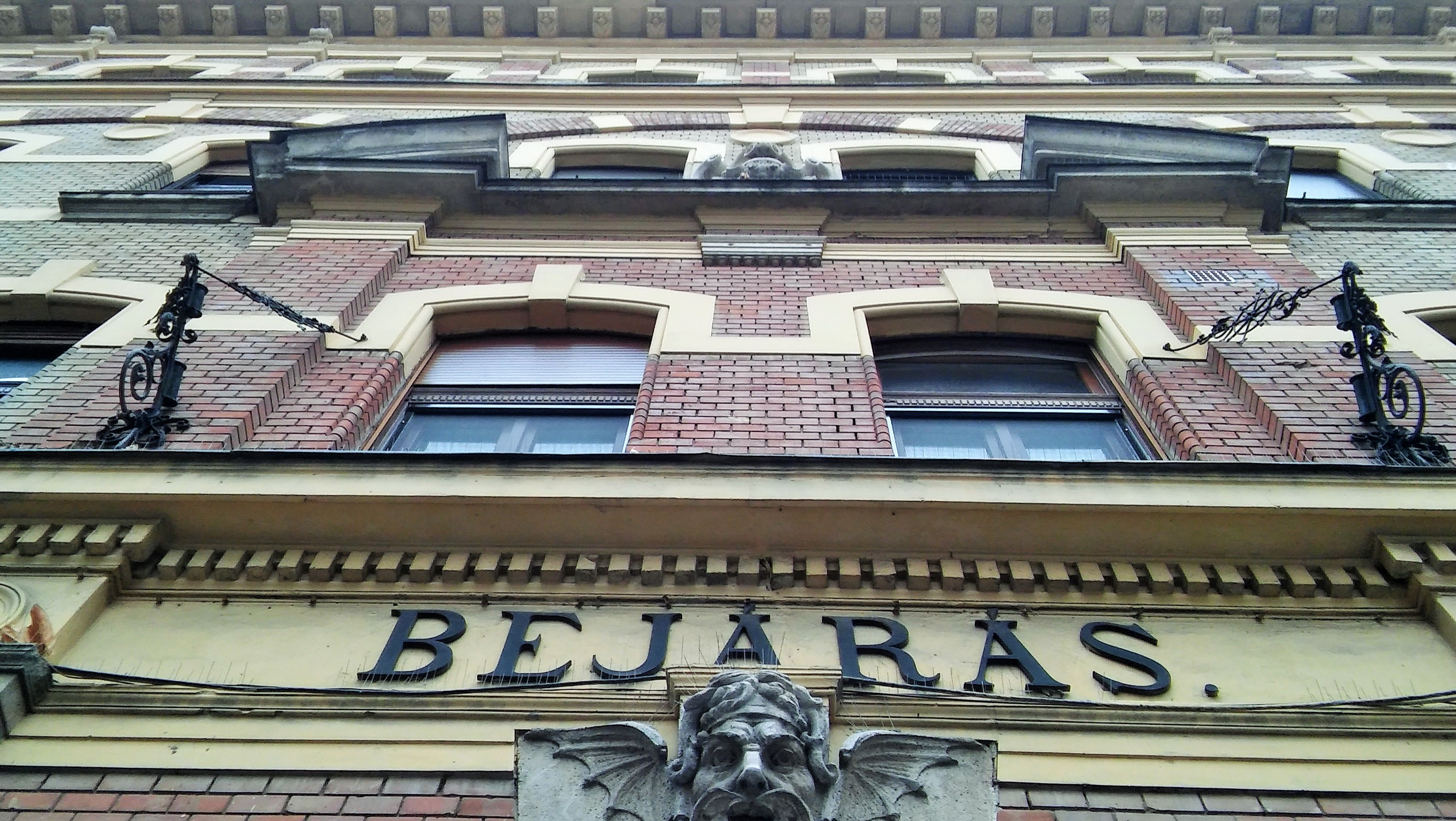

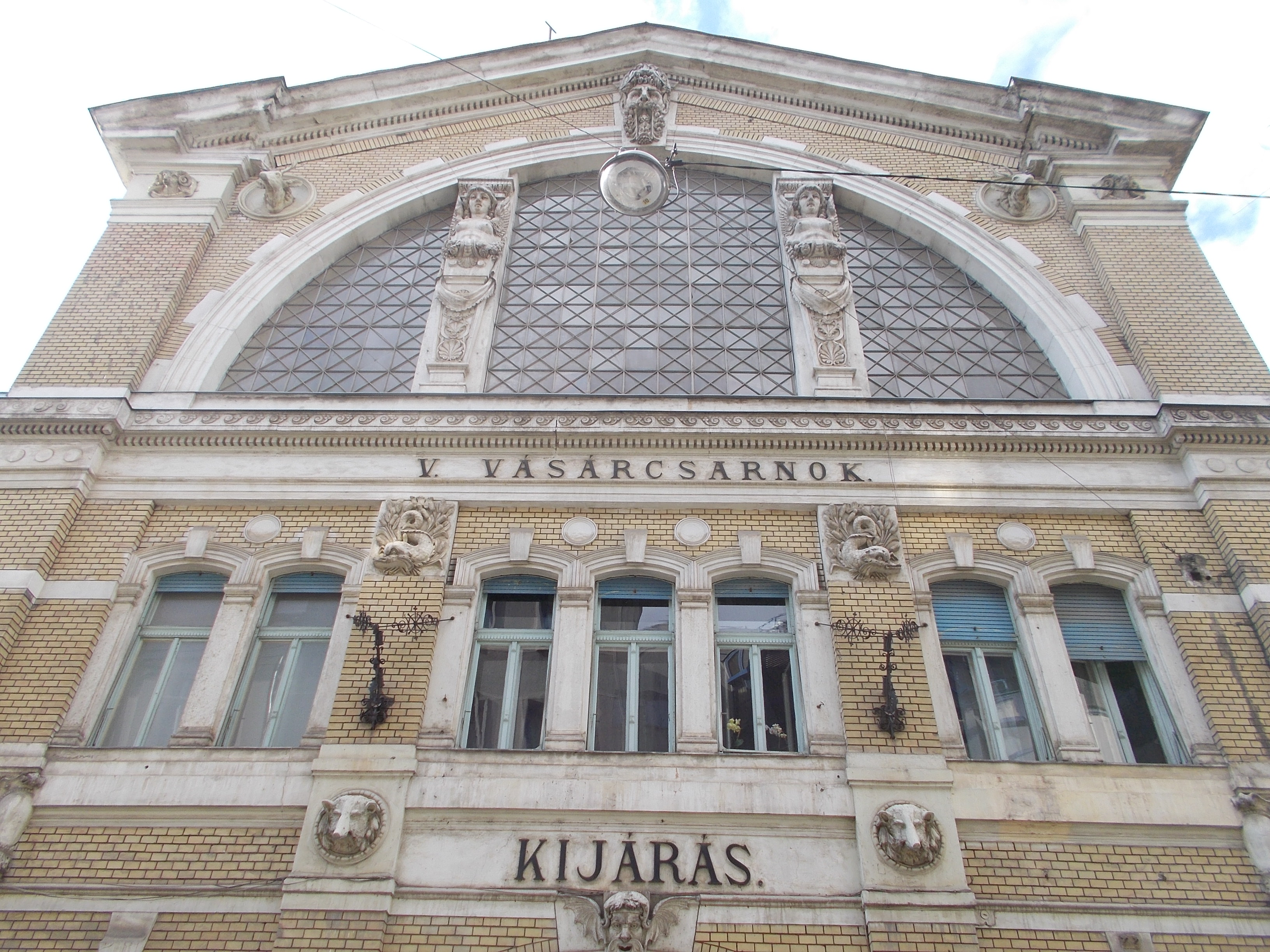

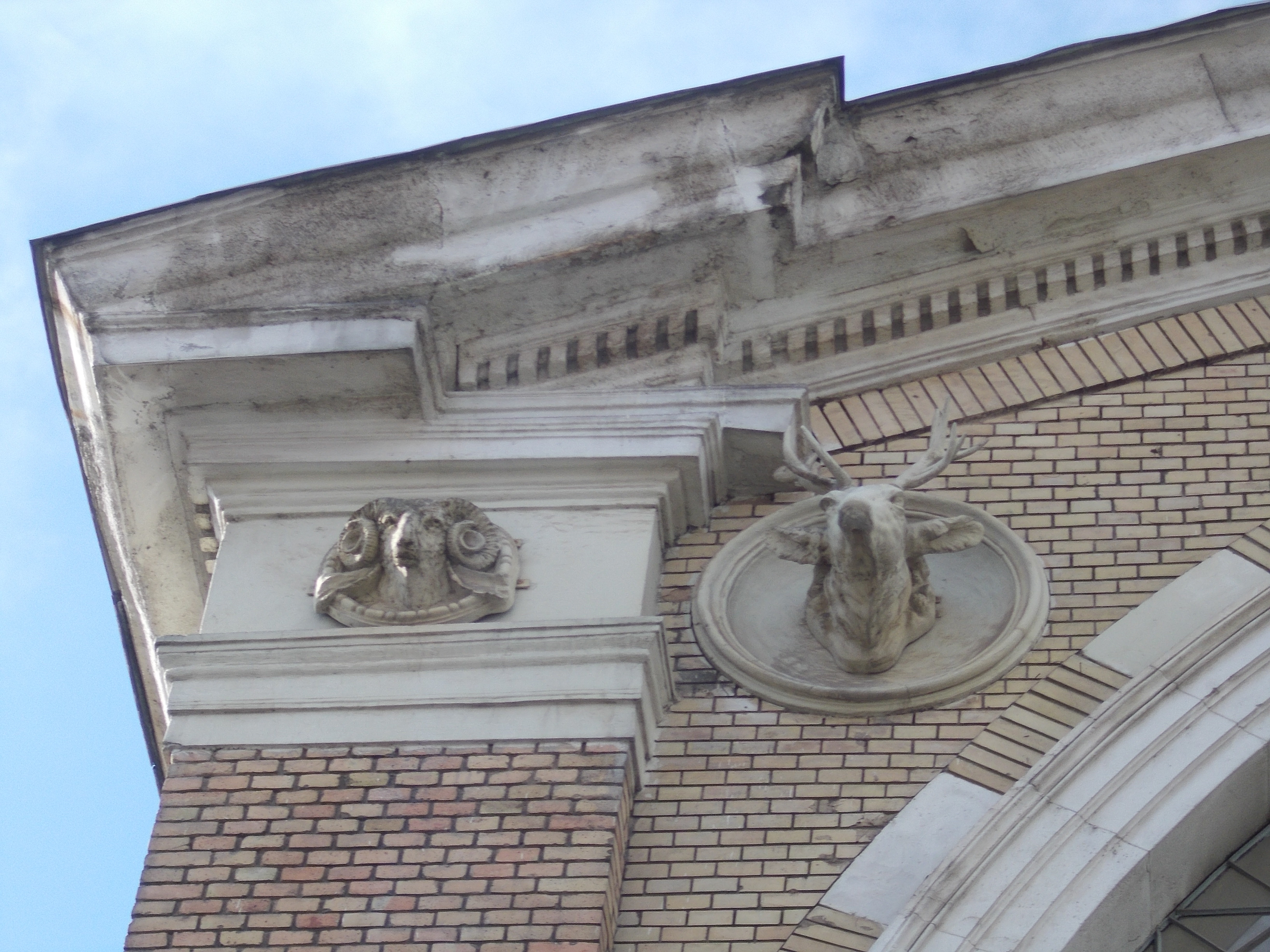

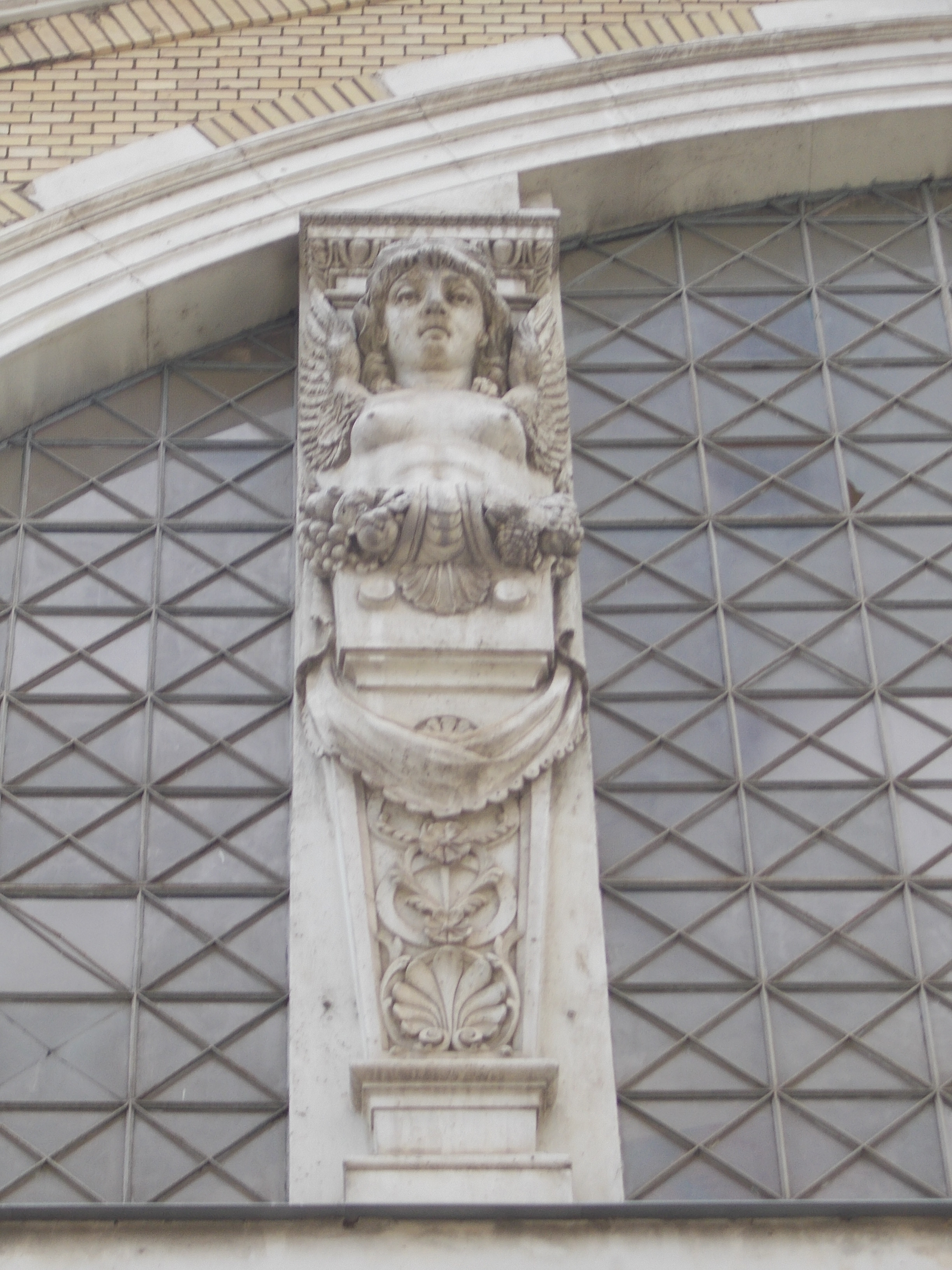

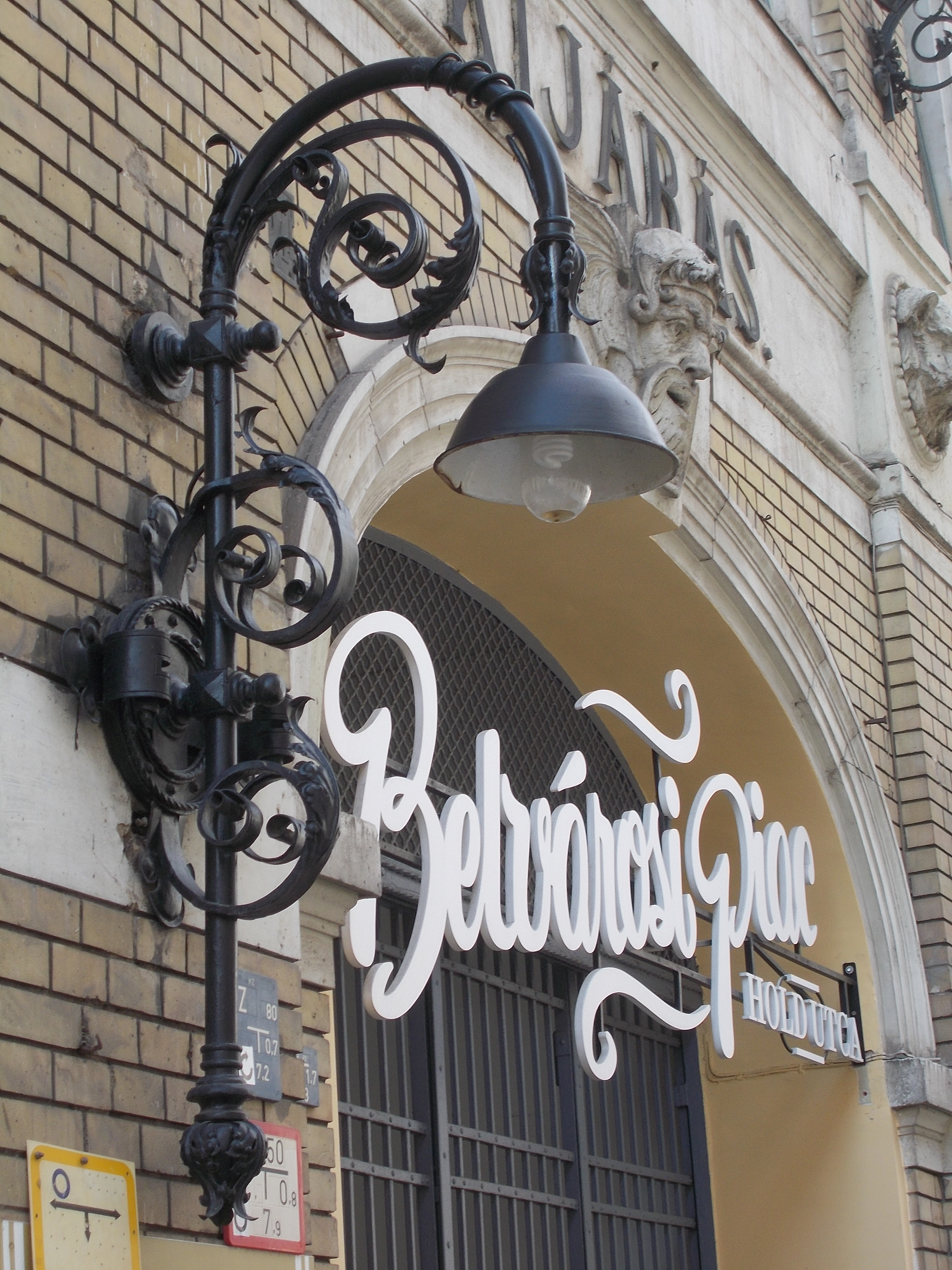

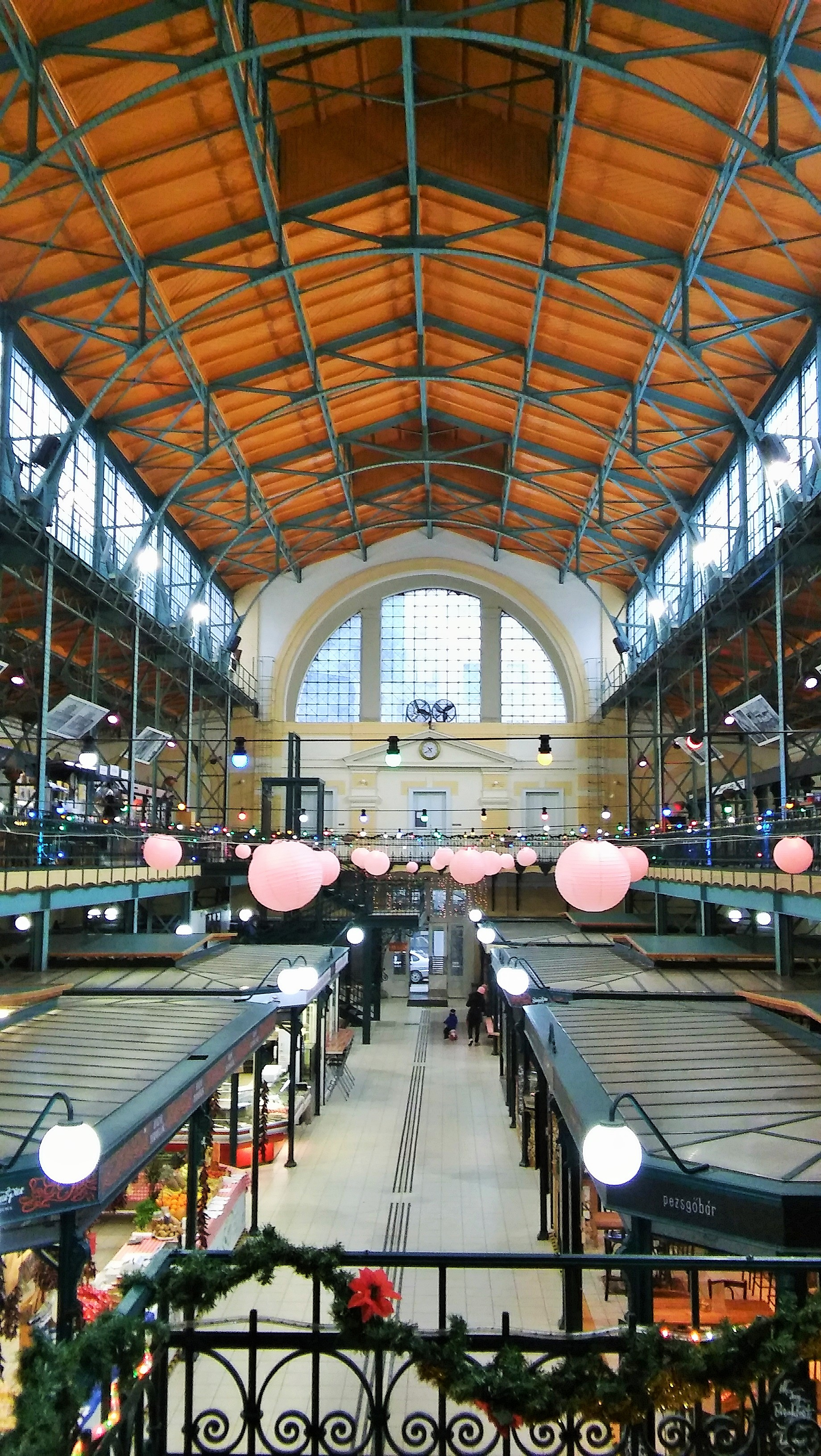

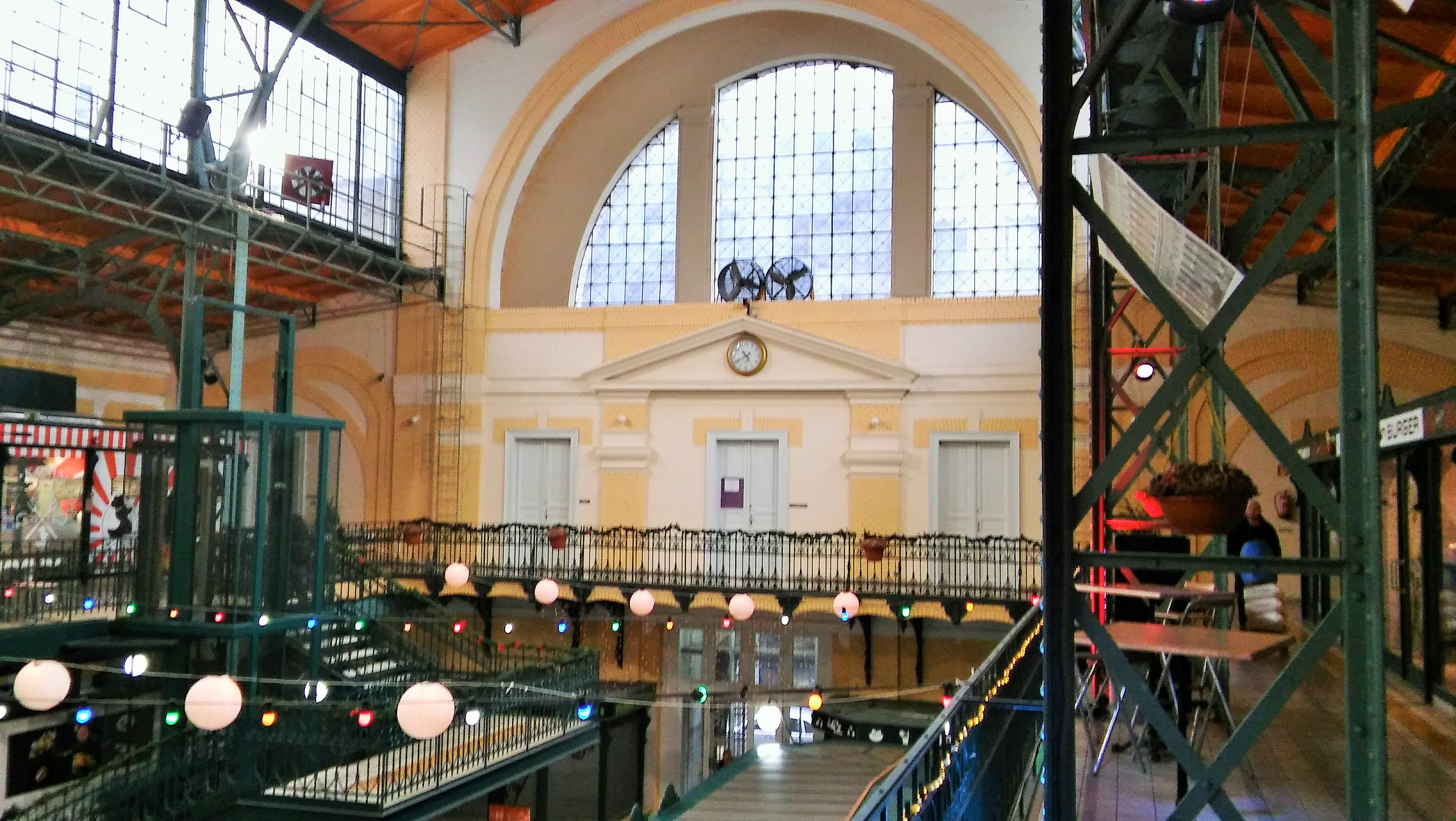

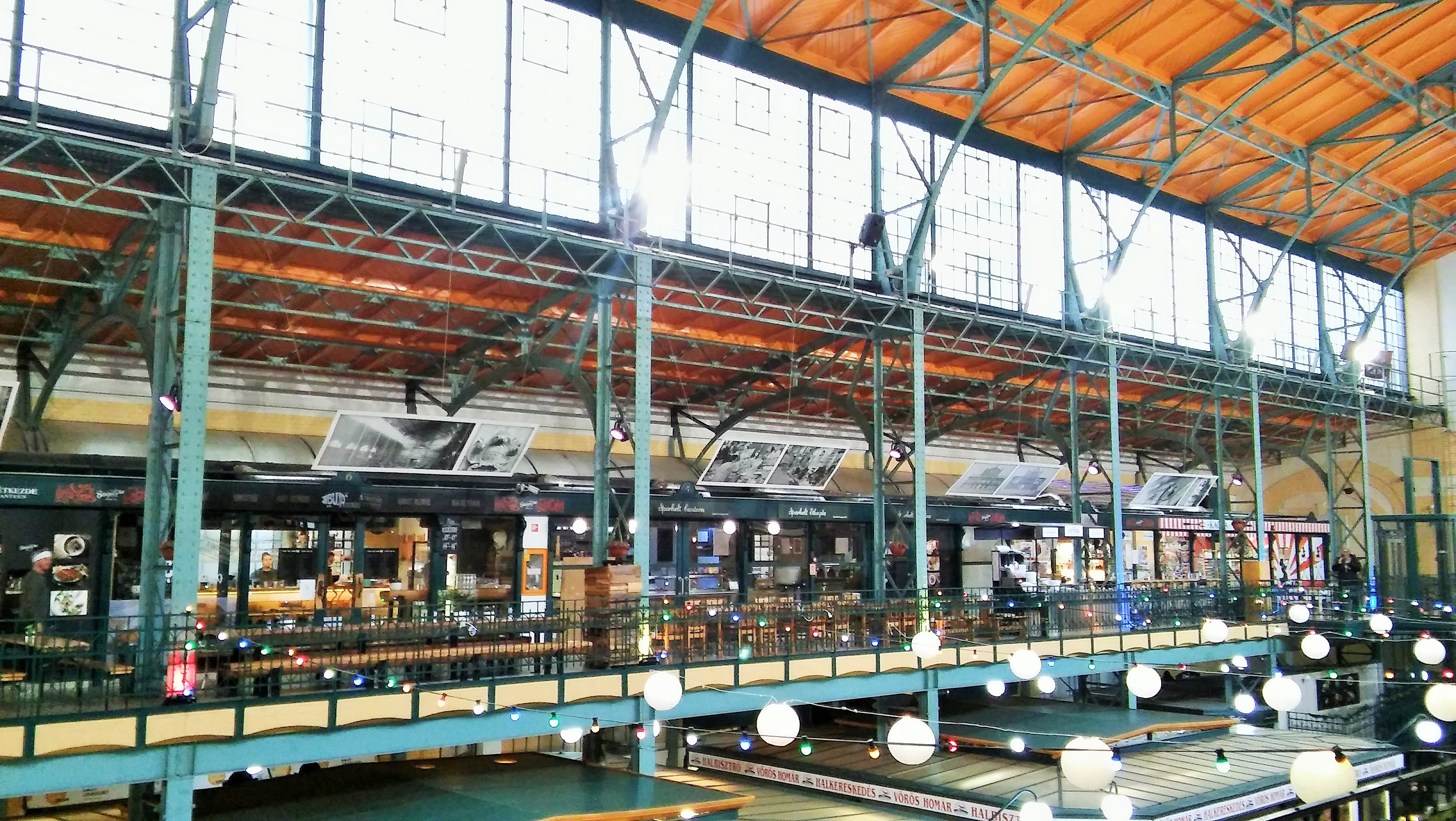

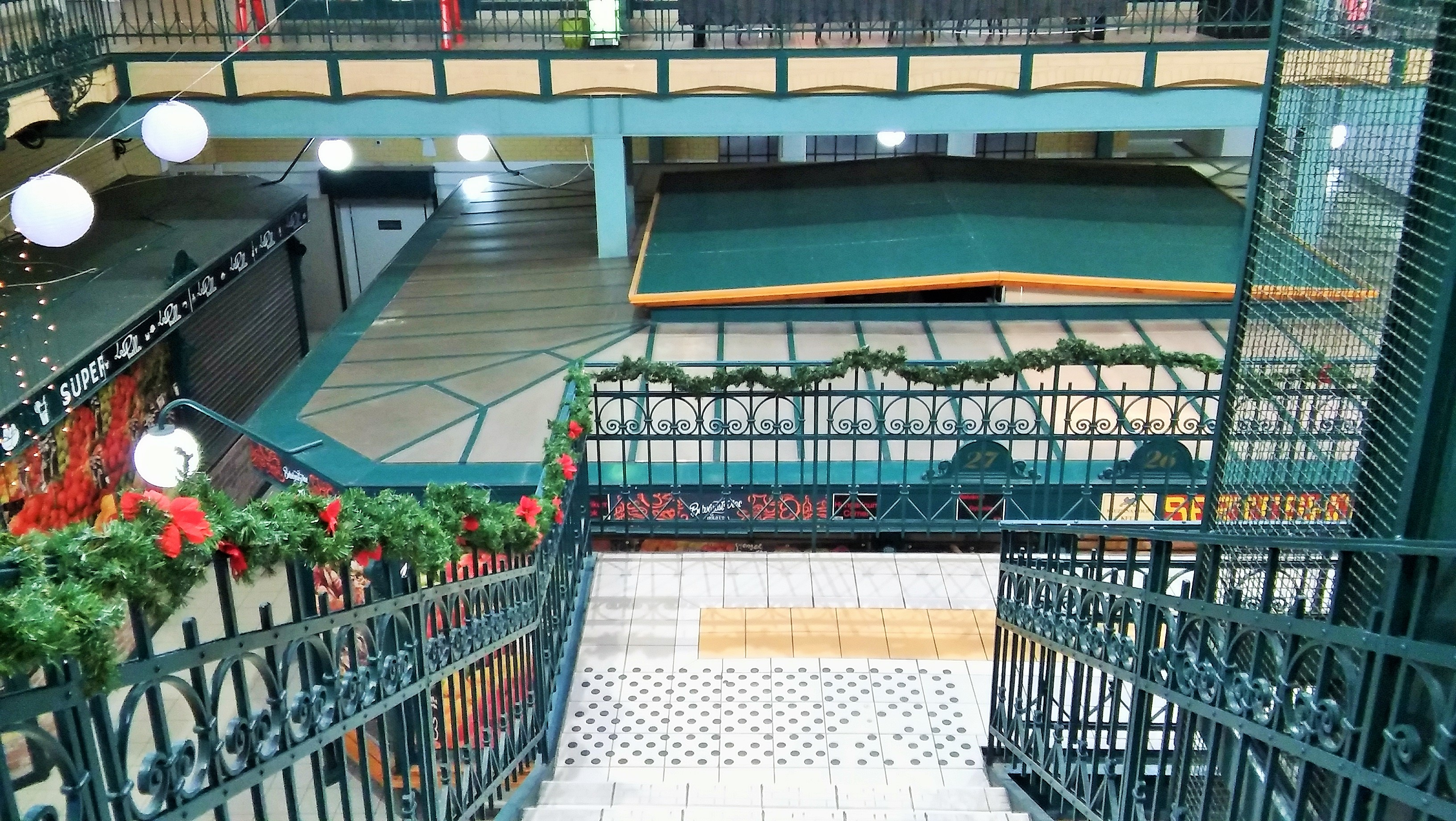

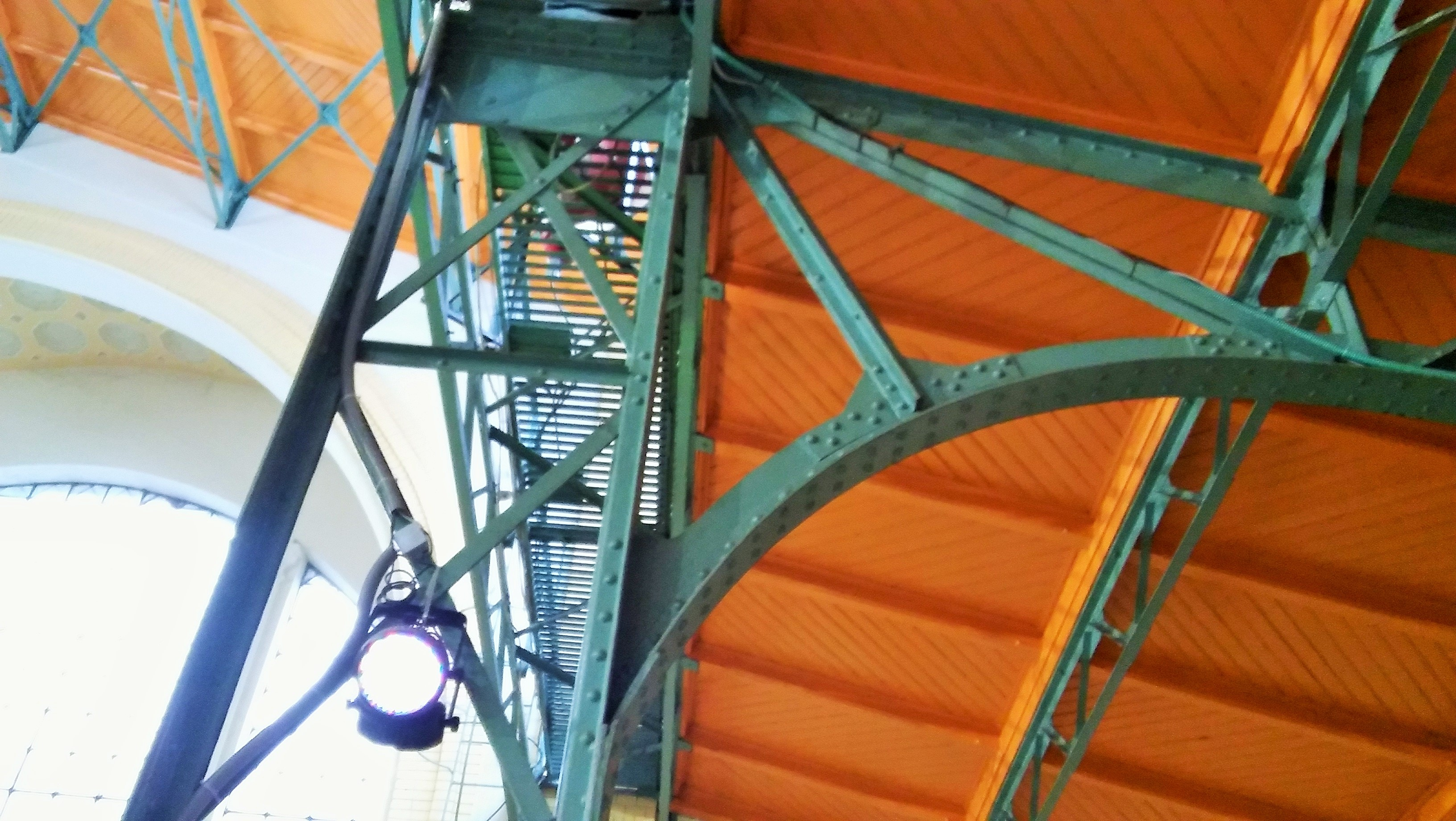
