= Budapest University of Economics and Business =

Business University in Budapest, Hungary

- Budapesti Gazdaságtudományi Egyetem
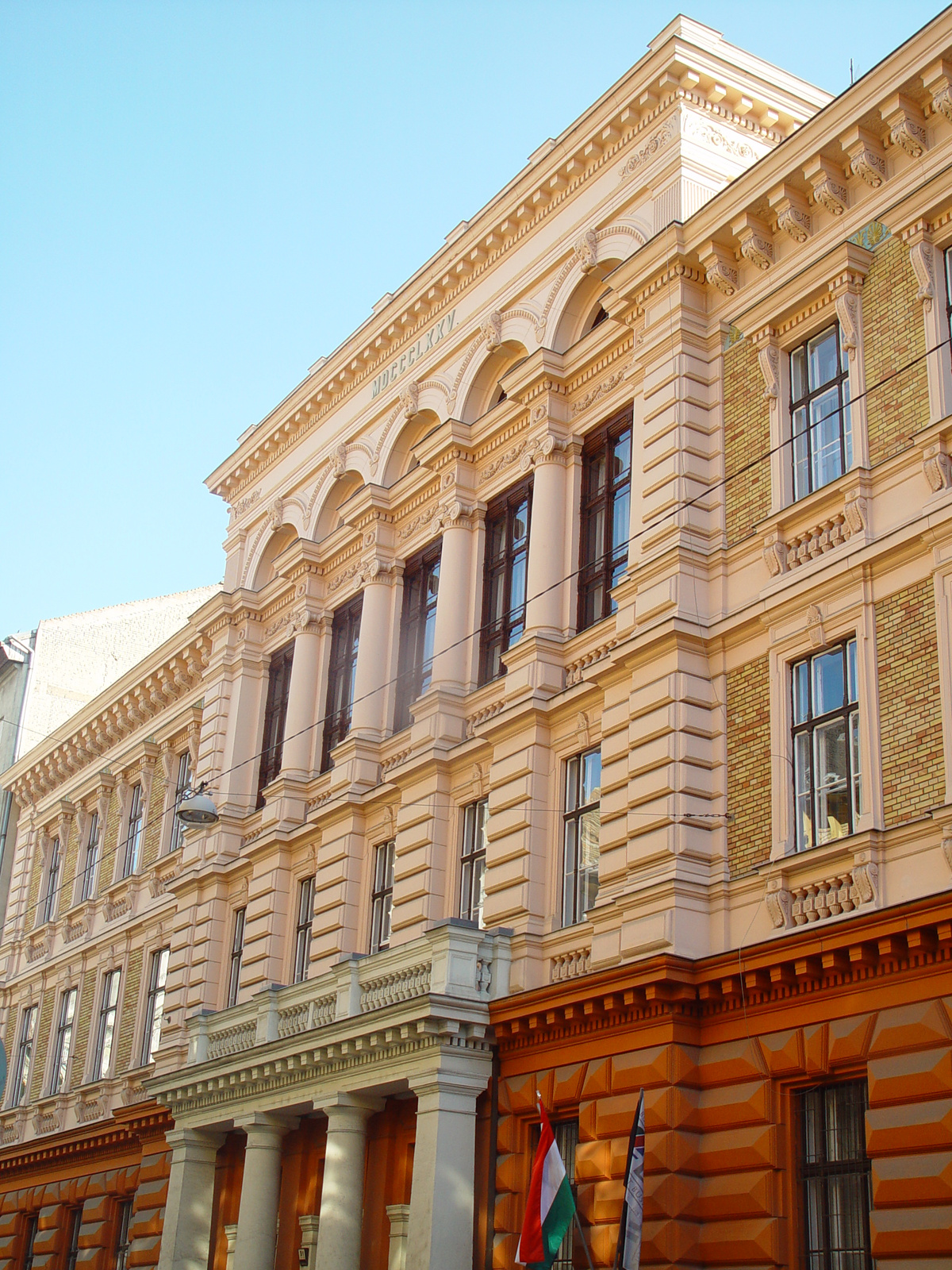
- BBS Rectorate in downtown Belváros-Lipótváros
- Former names: Budapest Business School
- Type: State owned public university
- Established: 1857; 169 years ago
- Affiliations: Network of International Business Schools, Association to Advance Collegiate Schools of Business, International Association of Universities, European University Association, Central and East European Management Development Association, European Association of Insitiutions of Higher Education, University Industry Innovation Network, Institute of Hospitality, Principles for Responsible Management Education
- Rector: Prof. Dr. Balázs Heidrich
- Academic staff: 400+
- Students: 19,000
- Location: Budapest, Hungary; 47°30′29″N 19°07′29″E
- Campus: small; Urban
- Colors: White and gold
- Website: uni-bge.hu

Budapest University of Economics and Business (BUEB) (Hungarian: Budapesti Gazdaságtudományi Egyetem) is a public business school specializing in business studies and social sciences, located in Budapest, Hungary. It was founded in 1857 by the merchants and bankers of Austria-Hungary. It is the oldest public business school in the world, and the second oldest among all business schools, after the ESCP Business School in Paris.

BUEB is the largest business school in Hungary. It conducts education and research in areas such as leadership, economics, operations management, marketing, entrepreneurship, and organizational behavior. The school offers 12 bachelor's degree programs, usually in English, French, German, or Hungarian, and 12 master's degree programs, including Master of Finance, Master of Management (equivalent to an MBA), Master of International Business, and Master of Tourism Management. It also offers a PhD in Management and other post-graduate professional qualifications.

== History and traditions ==
BBS was founded in 1857 as the Pest Academy of Commerce, which is the official predecessor of the BBS faculties of the College of Finance and Accountancy and the College of Catering, Commerce and Tourism. It was the first business school in Austria-Hungary and Central Europe, and is the second oldest existing business school in the world, after the ESCP Europe. After the cities of Buda and Pest merged, the institution was renamed the Budapest Academy of Commerce.

Győző Czigler designed the Alkomány Street campus of the Budapest Academy of Commerce in 1882 and its construction was finished in 1885, when the construction of the Hungarian Parliament Building began next door. It is still one of the school's main campuses.

BBS's campus at Markó Street is also located in downtown Budapest, housed in a neoclassical building designed by Ferenc Kolbenheyer in 1872. Inside, the Lotz Room is full of paintings by Károly Lotz and Mór Than. Many of the conferences of the Hungarian Presidency of the Council of the European Union were held in this room and other lecture rooms on campus.

The Budapest Academy of Commerce was a private business school until 1949, when the government nationalized it and made it a public business school.

After being renamed several times, the College of Accountancy was established in 1953 and the College of Catering and Commerce was established in 1969. In January 2000, the individual colleges created BBS and became faculties of the university.

On December 16, 2024 the Hungarian Parliament approved an amendment to the national higher education law, reclassifying the BUEB from a "university of applied sciences" to the highest "university" status. This change, effective from February 1, 2025, will also include renaming the institution to Budapesti Gazdaságtudományi Egyetem (BGE).

=== Predecessors of the Budapest University of Economics and Business ===
Period	Name	Location
1857–1873	Pest Academy of Commerce	Pest
1873–1953	Budapest Academy of Commerce	Budapest
1899–1920	Oriental Academy of Commerce	Budapest
1953–1970	College of Accountancy	Budapest
1970–2000	College of Finance and Accountancy	Budapest
1969–2000	College of International Management	Budapest
1969–2000	College of Commerce, Catering and Tourism	Budapest
2000–2025	Budapest Business School	Budapest
2025–present	Budapest University of Economics and Business	Budapest

== Campus and estate ==
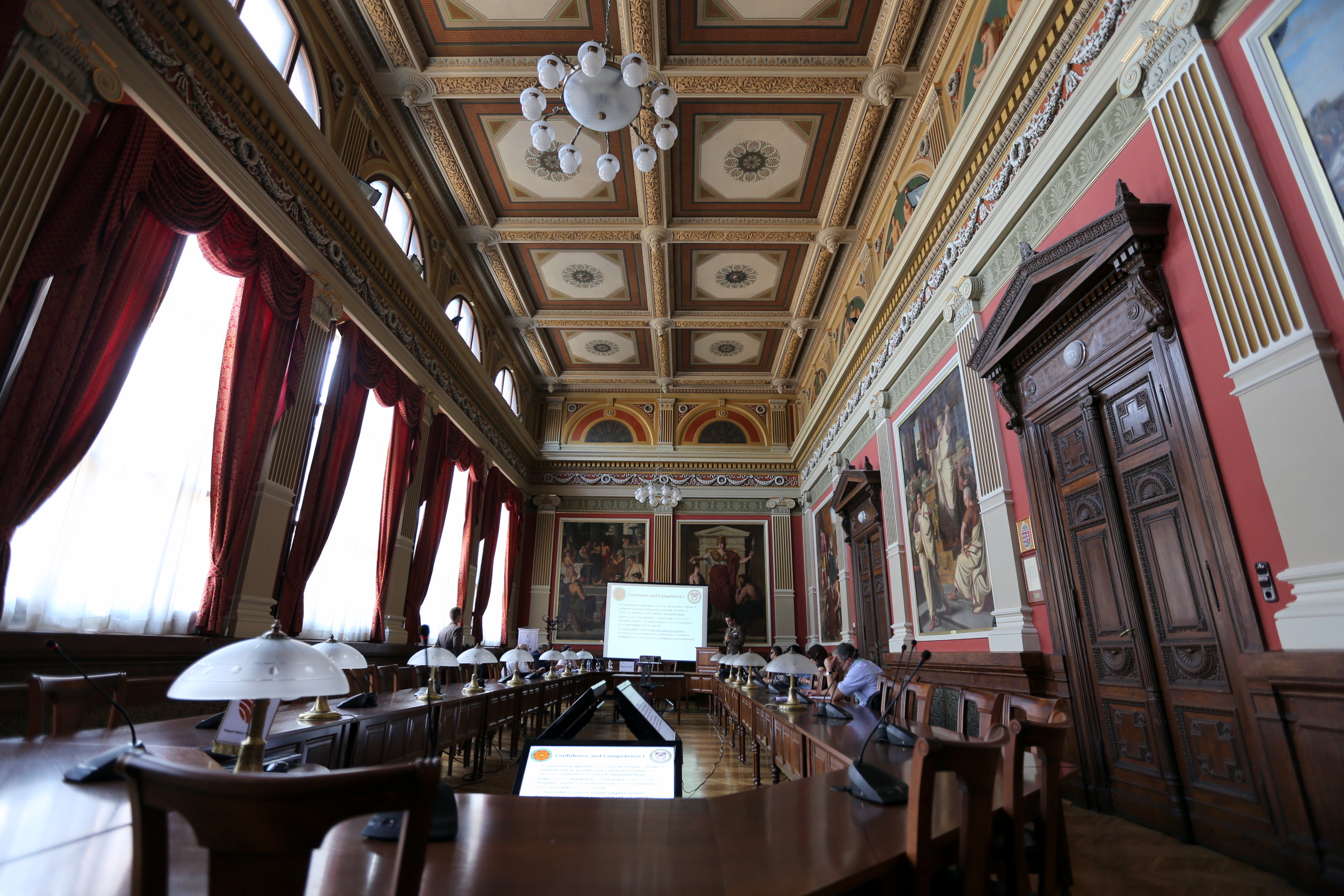
Rector's Council Hall, completed in 1876 with paintings by Károly Lotz

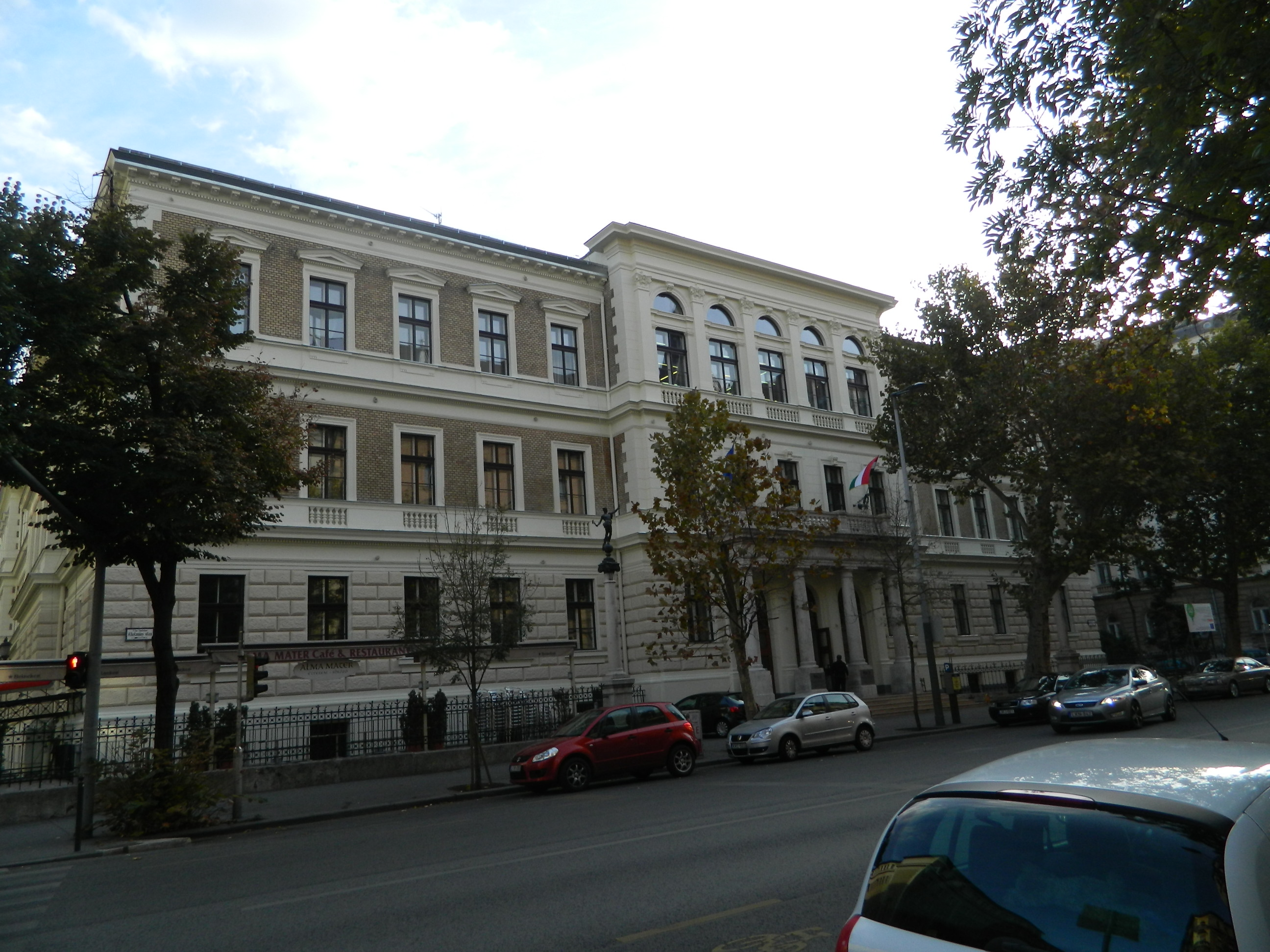
The building of Alkotmány Street was completed in 1857, which still functions as the main building of FCHT, based on plans of Győző Czigler

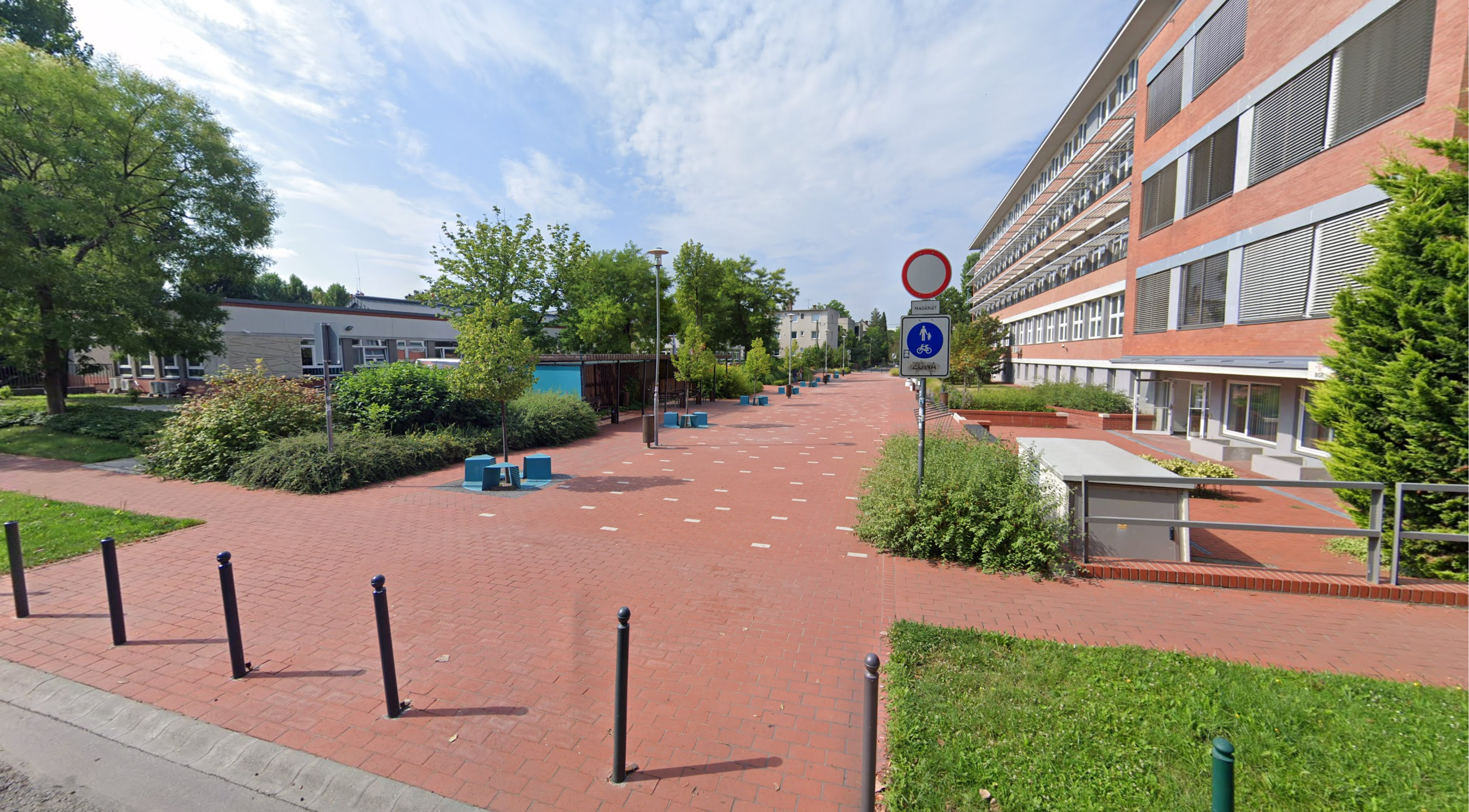
The FFA's Buzogány Street campus, where education has been going on since 1970 and which is the largest university faculty in Hungary with seven thousand students

BBS is split into the Faculty of Finance and Accounting (FFA), the Faculty of International Management and Business (FIMB), and the Faculty of Commerce, Hospitality, and Tourism (FCHT). Its campus is in district XIV in Budapest, on Buzogány Street.

The FIMB started as the Foreign Trade Vocational School and was established in 1957 to teach students to communicate in two foreign languages. In 1962, the school was transformed into an independent Higher Foreign Trade Vocational School. The foreign trade and commodity trade program was started in 1964. The institution was transformed into a college in 1971 and renamed the College of Foreign Trade. Specialist in-service training began in 1986, including Arabic and Japanese. Its campus is in district XVI in Budapest, on Diósy Lajos Street.

The origin of FCHT can be traced back to the establishment of the Pest Academy of Commerce in 1857, and thus its history was intertwined with the Faculty of Finance and Accounting until 1945. Its campus is in district V in Budapest on Alkotmány Street.

== Academic profile ==
Students can choose from a variety of undergraduate and postgraduate programs. Educational, academic, and research departments include:

- Institute of Foreign Languages and Communication
- Institute of Commerce and Marketing
- Institute of Economics
- Institute of Quantitative Methods
- Institute of Management and Business IT
- Institute of International Business Economics
- Institute of Finance and Accountancy
- Institute of Social Sciences and Pedagogy
- Institute of Tourism and Hospitality
- Doctoral School of Entrepreneurship and Business

=== Research ===
The faculties of BUEB published 3,401 publications from 2016 to 2019. In 2019, BBS faculty and researchers published 655 scientific publications, 34 of which were articles in internationally highly rated journals (rated D1, Q1–Q4). The vast majority of the university's publications during this period were scientific (93%), with about 5% of the publications being educational. Between 2015 and 2019, 55% of BUEB's publications were in Hungarian and 45% were in foreign languages.

There are more than 60 research groups at BUEB. In 2019, the Research Fund's application system funded seven research projects at the university. Reflecting on the strategic areas of BUEB, the university established four centers of excellence that focus on the four main areas of the school's applied research: the Budapest LAB Entrepreneurship Centre, the Centre of Excellence for Sustainable Hospitality, the Future of Higher Education Research Centre, and the Centre of Excellence for Cybereconomy. The staff of FHERC won the 2019 Professional Award of the Subcommittee on Management and Organizational Sciences of the Hungarian Academy of Sciences in the category of foreign journal articles.

In 2019, the proportion of PhD-qualified lecturers exceeded 55%. Many BUEB lecturers and professors are members of the various scientific committees of the Hungarian Academy of Sciences and the Hungarian Rectors' Conference, and are leading and opinion-forming representatives in international and domestic professional organizations.

== Student life ==
BBS has student organizations, publishes several student journals, and offers opportunities to participate in other leisure and creative activities.

BBS has various international partnerships with foreign higher education institutions, allowing students to complete foreign exchange studies.

== Rankings and reputation ==
About 78% of BBS graduates in 2019 found full-time employment at their time of graduation. In 2020, the Faculty of Finance and Accountancy finished first on the university faculty popularity list in Hungary, while the Faculty of Commerce, Hospitality and Tourism and the Faculty of International Management and Business, were also among the 10 most popular.

According to the HVG Diploma 2019, BBS-FCHT ranks second and BBS-FIMB ranks fourth among the Hungarian faculties of economics in terms of student excellence, which includes the number of first-place applicants, the average number of students admitted, the proportion of those admitted to the language test, and the number of those placed in the study competition. In the category of universities, BBS won the Higher Education Quality Award with the Corvinus University of Budapest in 2010.

In 2020, BBS was ranked on Webometrics Research as the #1 business school in Hungary, #33 in Europe, and #66 in the world. The Institute for Economic and Enterprise Research shows in HVG Diploma Magazine, BBS is #1 in the areas of finance, accounting, economic analyses, human resource management, and tourism management among all the universities in Hungary, and is also ranked in the top three in any other business and economic study area.

== Accreditations ==
Budapest Business University (BBU) received NIBS accreditation in 2017, affirming the institution’s commitment to high-quality international business education.

The BSc in Tourism and Catering and the MSc in Tourism Management at BBU have been accredited by the Institute of Hospitality, ensuring alignment with international standards. The Institute’s accredited programs are recognized across various regions, including Canada, the European Union, the UAE, Singapore, Malaysia, Hong Kong, New Zealand, and Australia.

The BA in Communications and Media Studies at BBU became the first academic program in Central and Eastern Europe to receive CIPR recognition, highlighting the program’s excellence in public relations and communication education.

== Notable alumni ==
- Zsuzsa Beke – Gedeon Richter Plc. Director of Public and Government Relations
- László Békesi – Minister of Finance of Hungary (twice)
- Sándor Csányi – President and CEO of OTP Bank; the wealthiest Hungarian
- Róbert Cselovszki – Chairman and CEO of Erste Investment
- Mózes Csoma – Korean ambassador, orientalist
- Dávid Ilona – President and CEO of Hungarian State Railways
- Demeter Ervin – Minister for Secret Service (2000–2002)
- Sándor Demján – former President of TriGránit Zrt.; the second wealthiest Hungarian
- Ádám Egerszegi – Takarékbank Vice President, Deputy CEO
- Beáta Előd – Head of Citibank Hungary Branch and Budapest Citi Service Center
- Tamás Erdei – former CEO of MKB Bank, member of the Board of Directors of OTP
- Ibolya Görög – Protocol Expert, Chief of Protocol of the Office of the Prime Minister
- Zsolt Gyulay – Olympic and world champion kayaker
- András Gyürk – Member of European Parliament member and Parliamentary Assembly of the Council of Europe member
- György Hölvényi – Member of European Parliament and State Secretary
- Ferenc Juhász – Minister of Defence (2002–2006)
- Pál Kovács – Vice President of the International Atomic Energy Agency, MVM Group President of Board
- András Tállai – Deputy Minister, Ministry of Finance
- István Tukacs – Member of Parliament, Member of the Committee on Budgets
- Márk Varga – Amundi Fund Management chief of sales
- Zoltán Varga – Minister of Local Government
- Csaba Lentner – economist, university professor, Member of Parliament
- Katalin Lévai – Minister for Equal Opportunities (2002–2004)
- András Loncsák – Aegon Hungary Fund Management manager, Member of the Board
- Balázs Margittai – K&H Bank senior capital market trader
- Károly Mátrai – CEO of Hungarian Central Clearing House and Depository
- Tamás Menczer – State Secretary for Foreign Affairs
- Mariann Peller – RTL Klub, Radio 1 presenter
- Zsolt Pillár – CEO of Equilor Investment, Chairman of the Board
- László Puch – Member of Parliament, Party Director
- Gábor Scheiring – Chief of Staff of the LMP – Hungary's Green Party
- Gábor Schőner – Hungarian Banking Association chief economist
- András Sebők – purchasing and supply chain director for Wizz Air
- István Simicskó – Minister of Defense
- Balázs Simon Róbert – Member of Parliament, State Secretary, Győr Deputy Mayor
- Nóra Szeles – CEO of Hermes Fund Management
- Erzsébet Székelyné Pásztor – PR and external relations director for MOL and then BKV Plc.
- Pál Szekeres – Deputy Secretary of State, sports director, three-time Paralympic champion fencer
- Klaudia Szemereyné Pataki – Mayor of Kecskemét, 10th most influential Hungarian woman
- Ferenc Szöllősi – Chairman and CEO of Dialóg Investment Fund Management
- Imre Sztanó – lifetime achievement award winner BBS Head of Dep, Member of the Scientific Council for Higher Education
