= Hunyadi Square Market Hall, Budapest =

Coordinates: 47.5053°N 19.0666°E

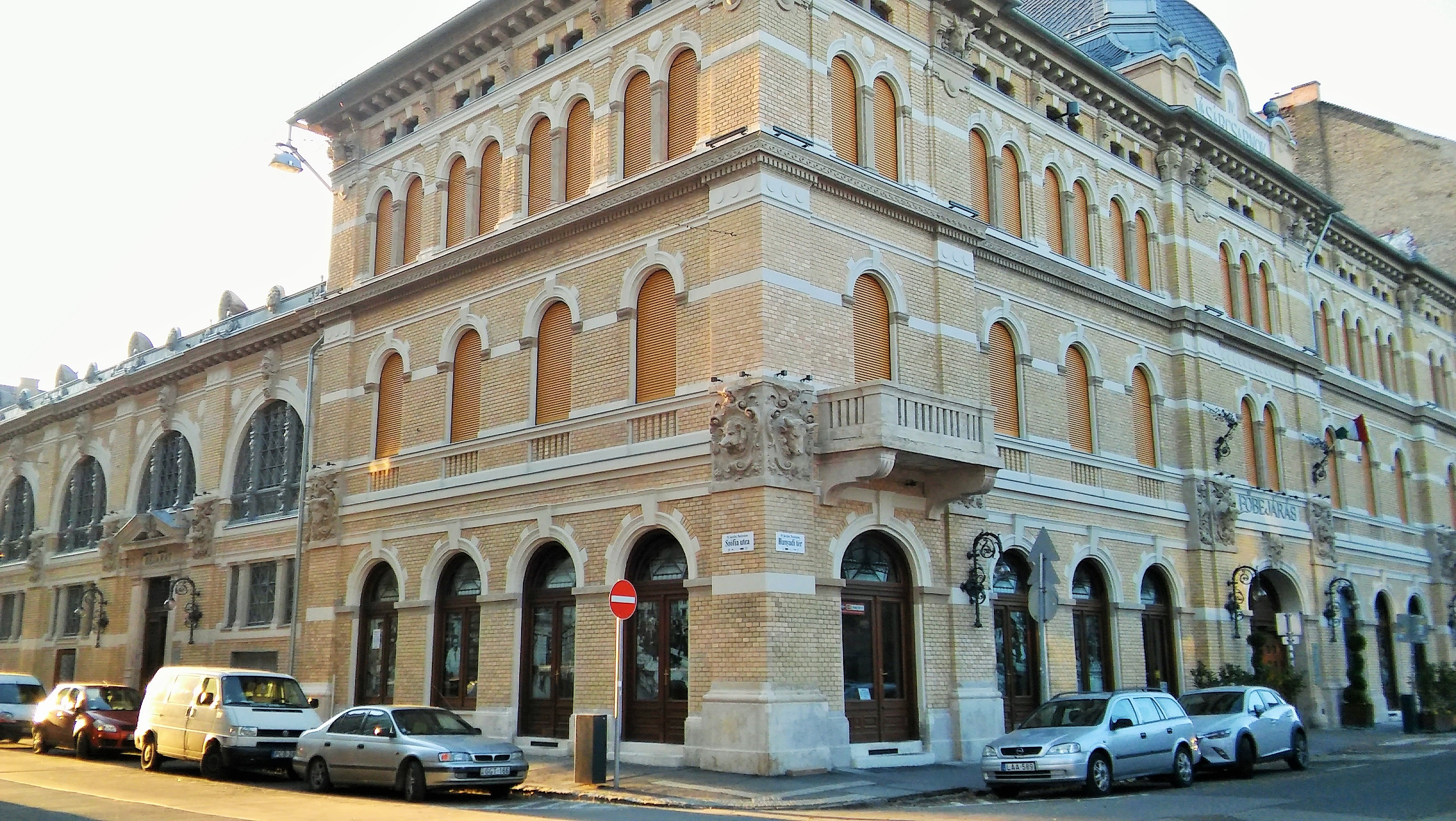

The Hunyadi Square Market Hall or Market Hall IV was built in 1897, according to the plans of Győző Czigler in the Terézváros district of Budapest. It is similar in style to the other five market halls built almost simultaneously. Powered by the Public Works Council, these were built by the capital.

The exterior façade is decorated with plaster stucco elements on the wall pillars. Satin heads, semi-circular windows, satin heads, palmetto ornaments and lion heads decorate the eaves.

The hall space is a three-nave, basilic arrangement. During the time of the Hungarian People's Republic, there were many trommel interiors in the interior, but the original cofastand with its cast iron ornaments and grilles still survives in the side ships. The interior of the hall is also relatively intact. The steel supports of the roof structure are elliptical and riveted.

The building, which was in a very dilapidated state, was renovated in 2019.

== Gallery ==
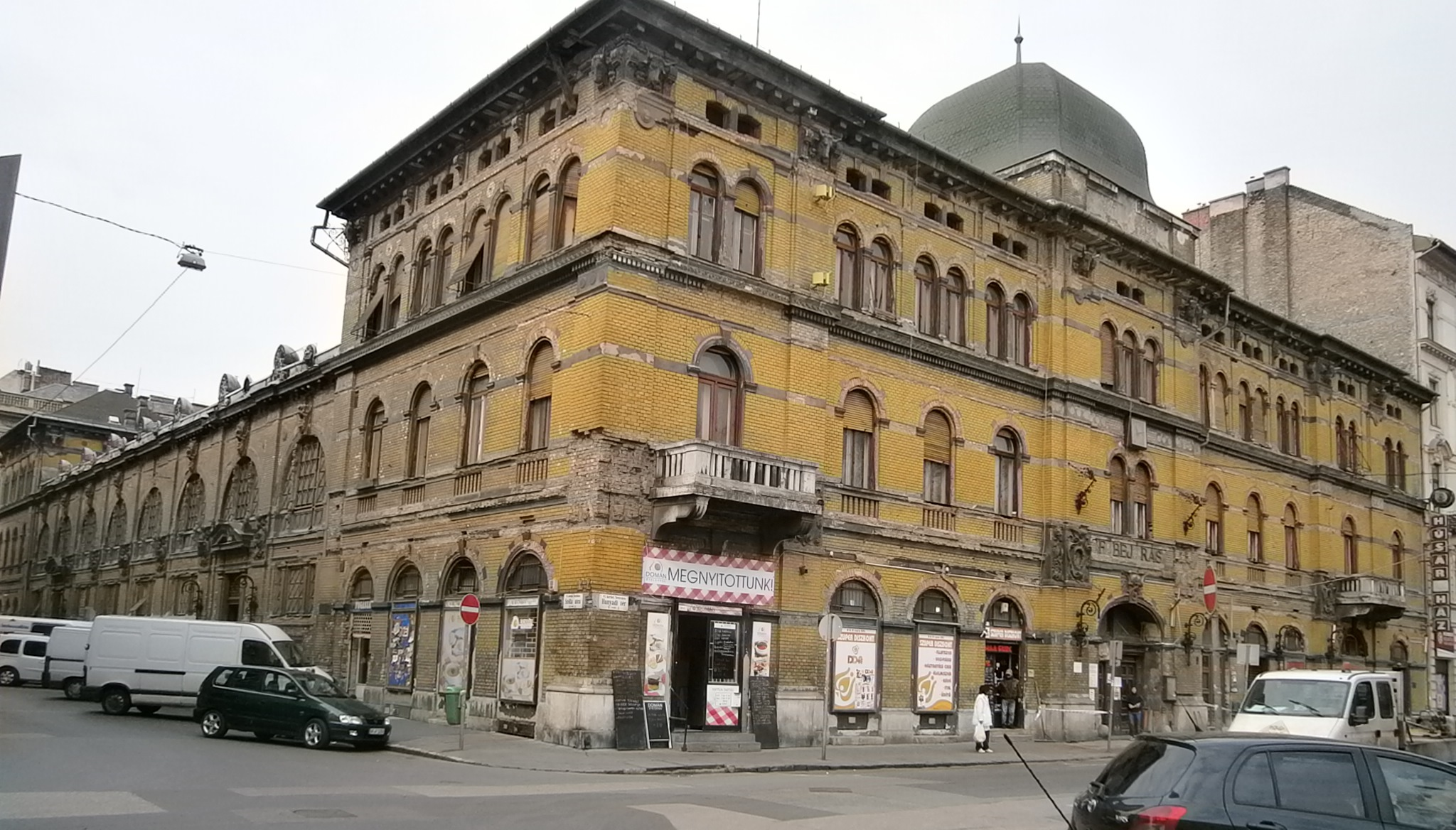
Before renovated

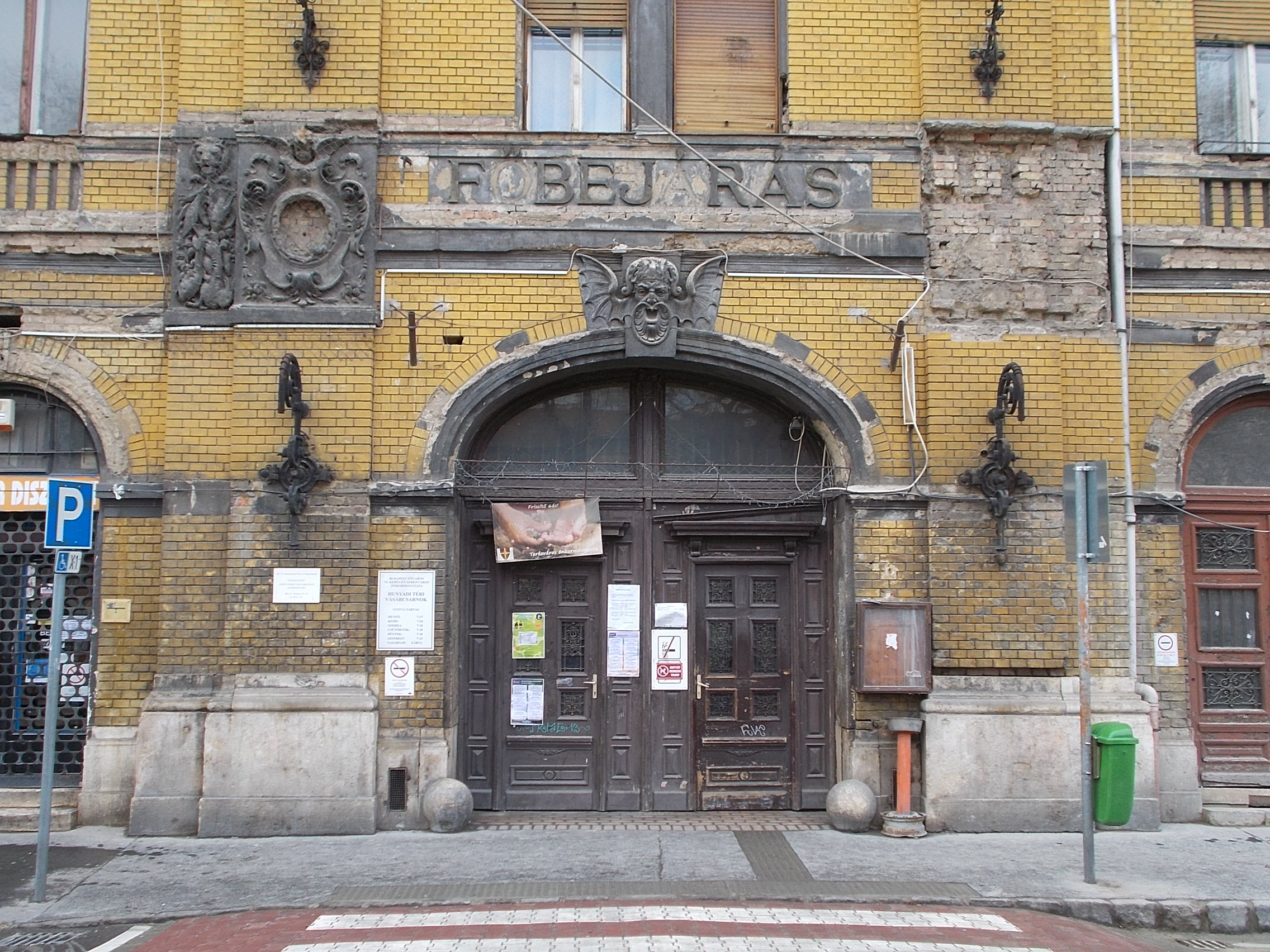

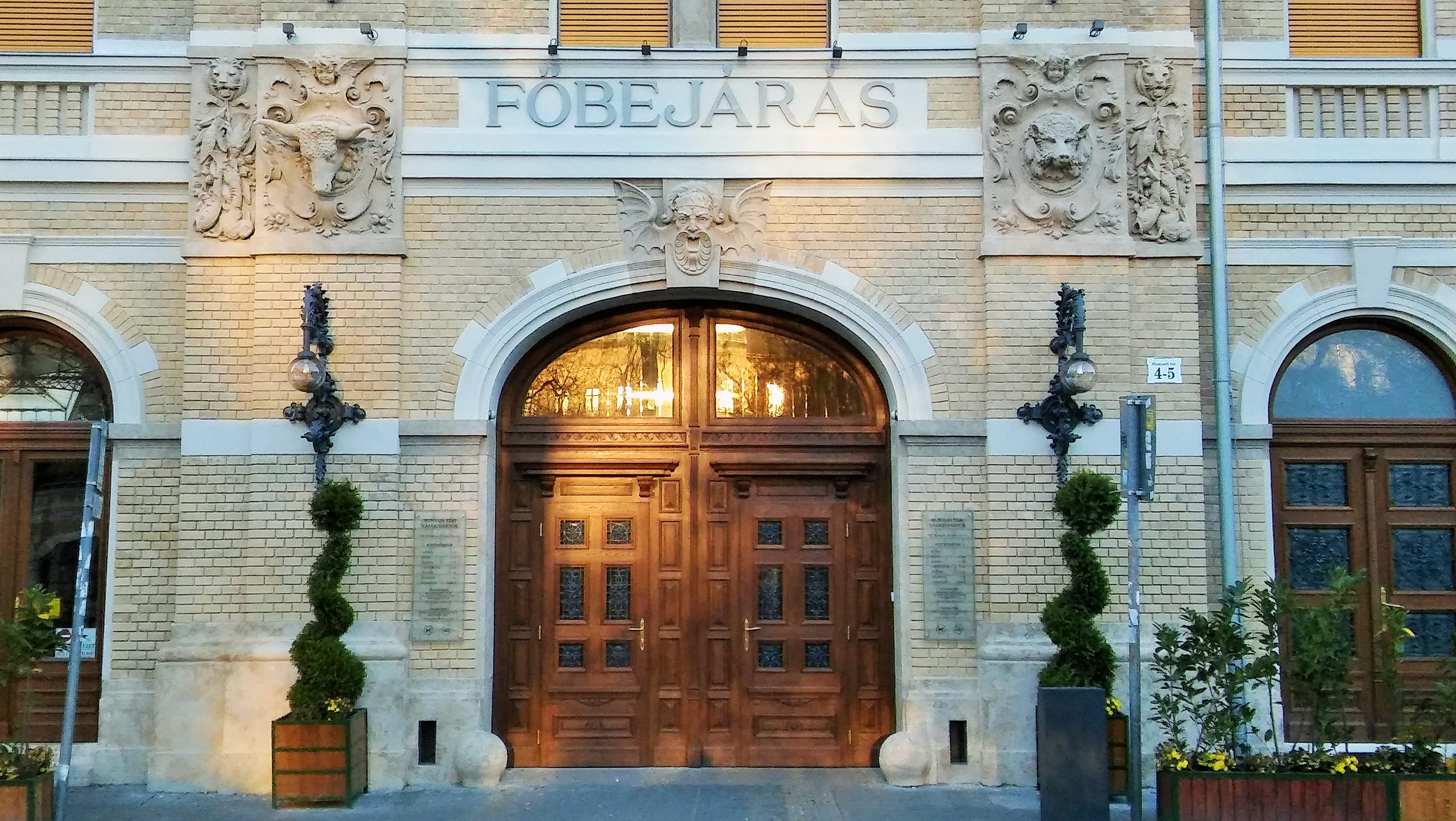

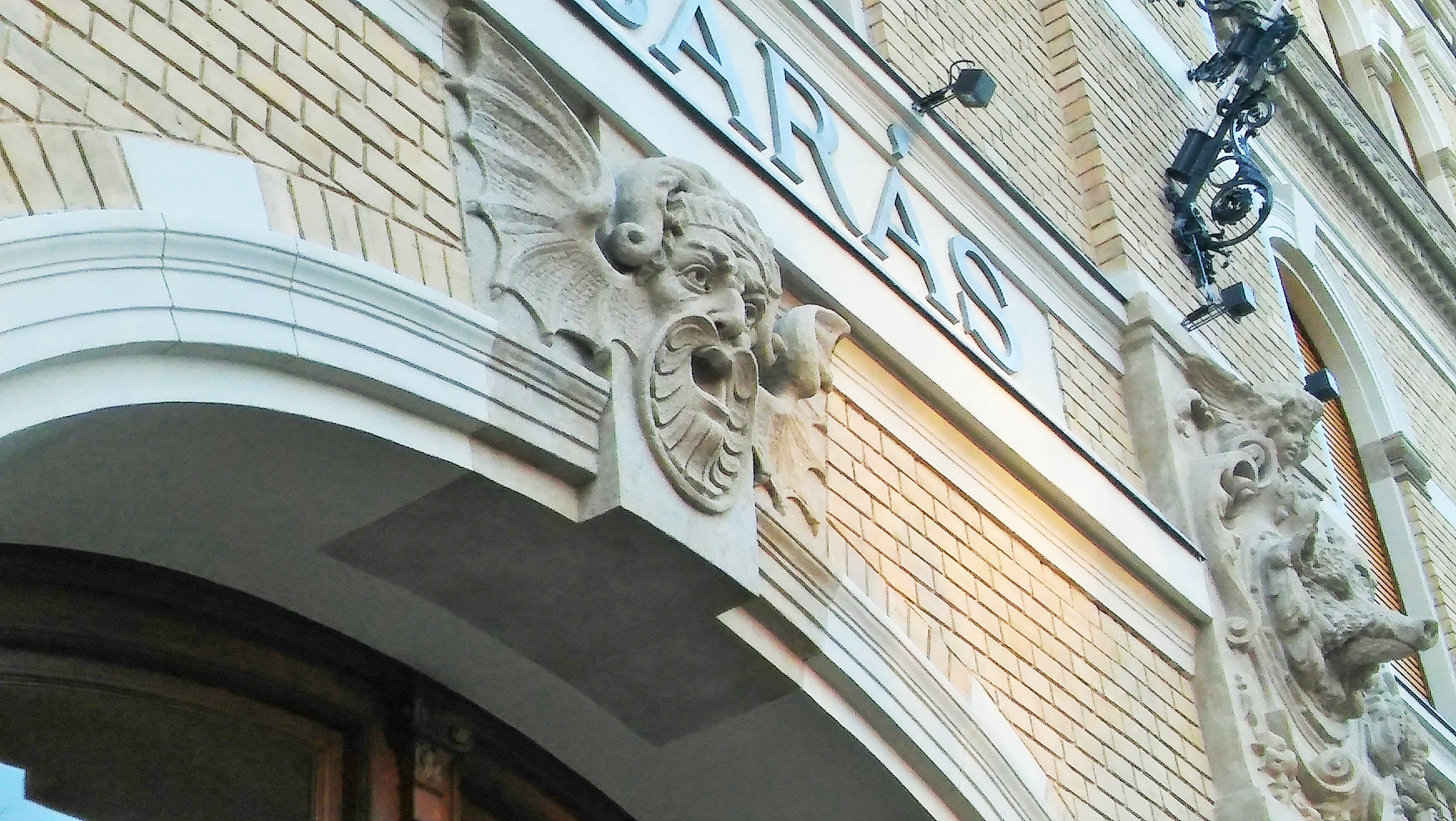

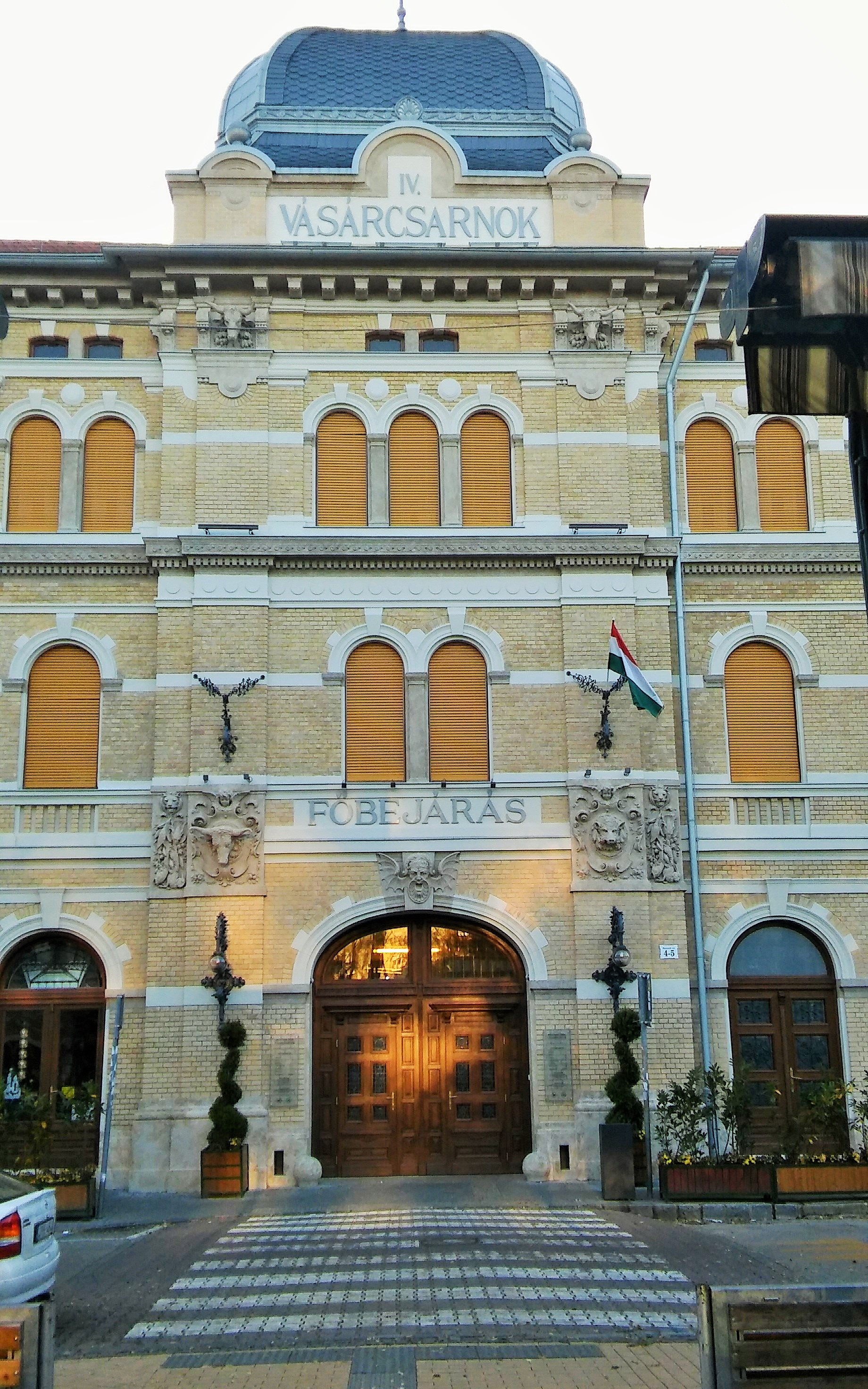

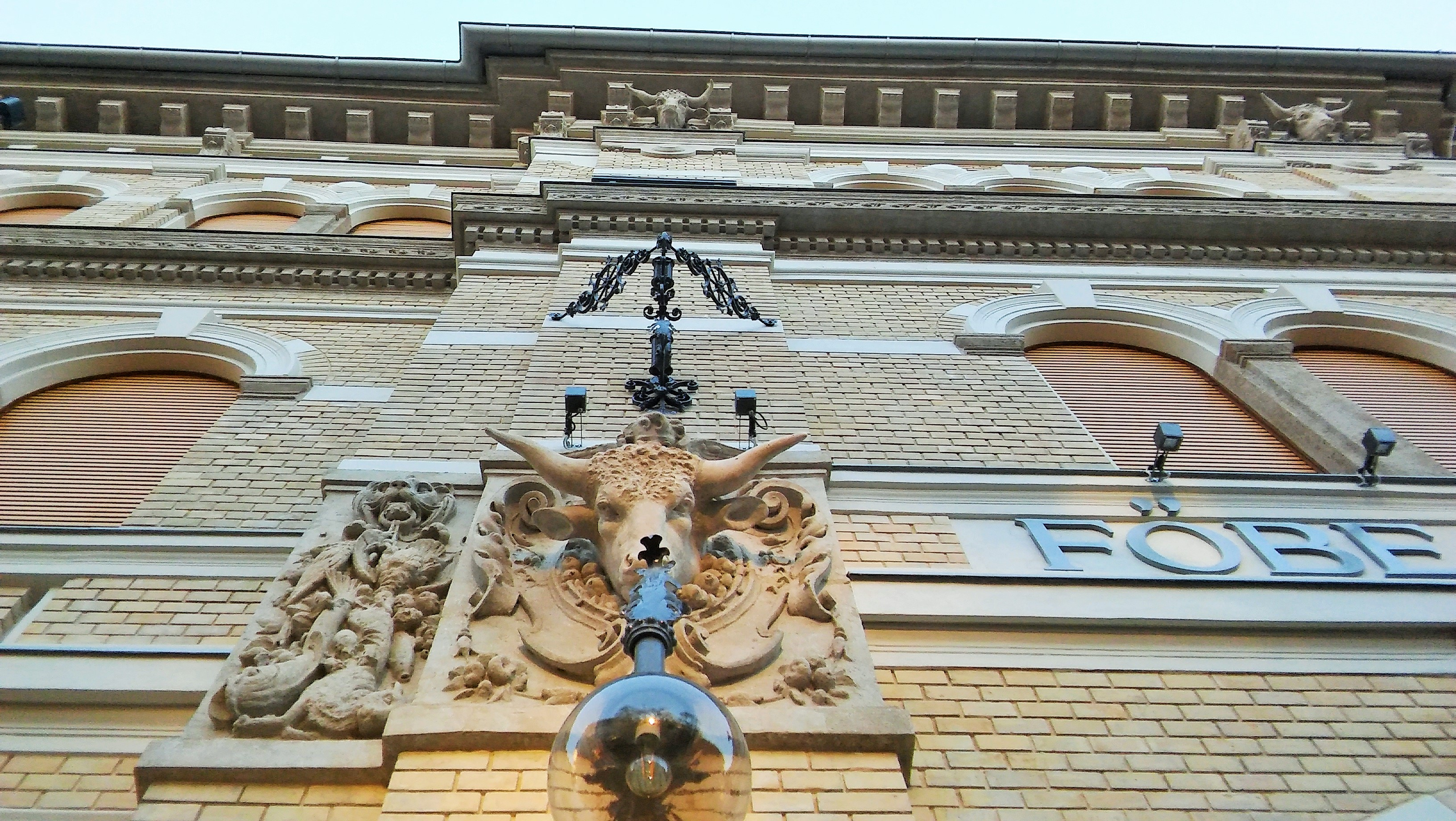

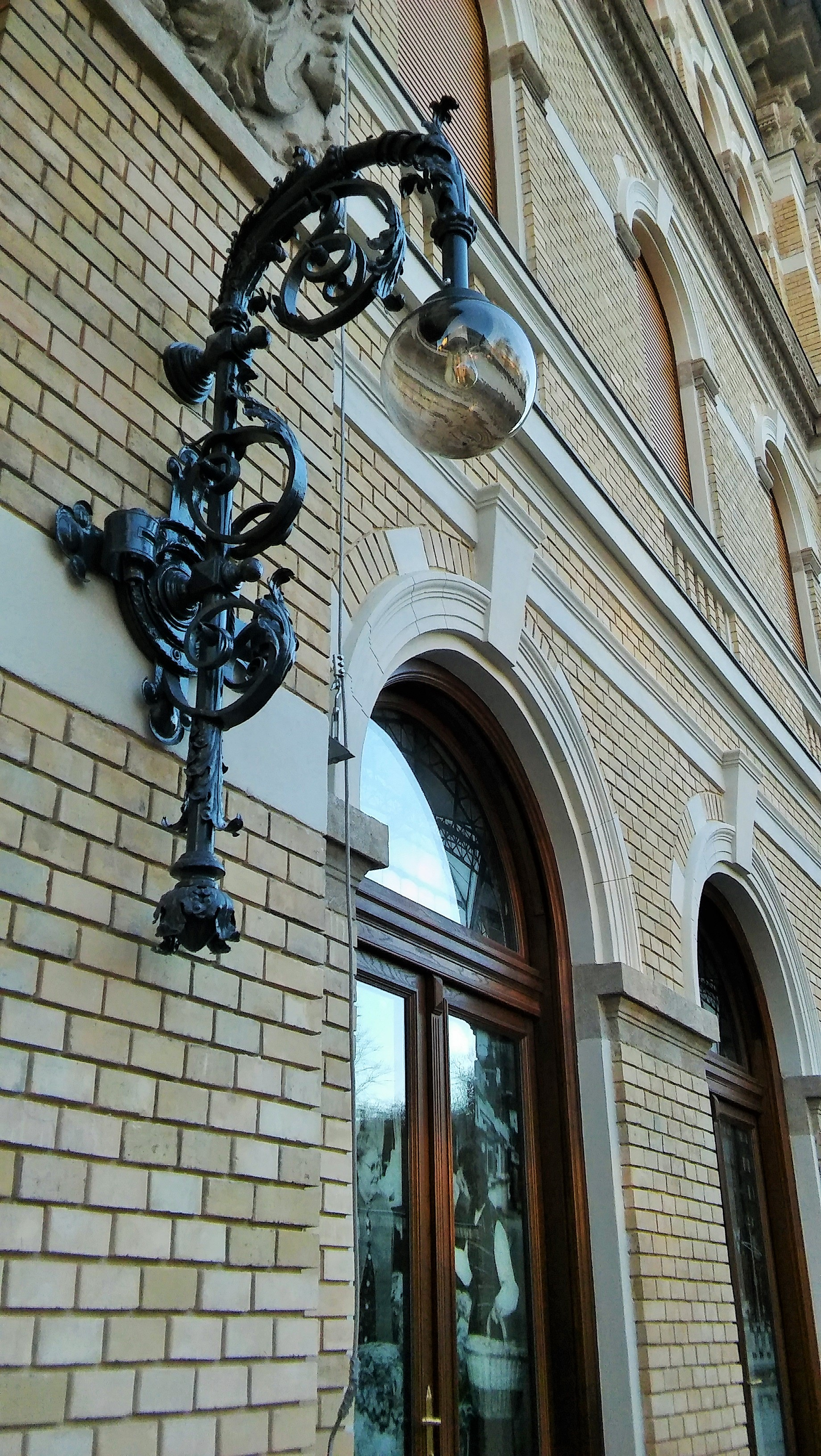

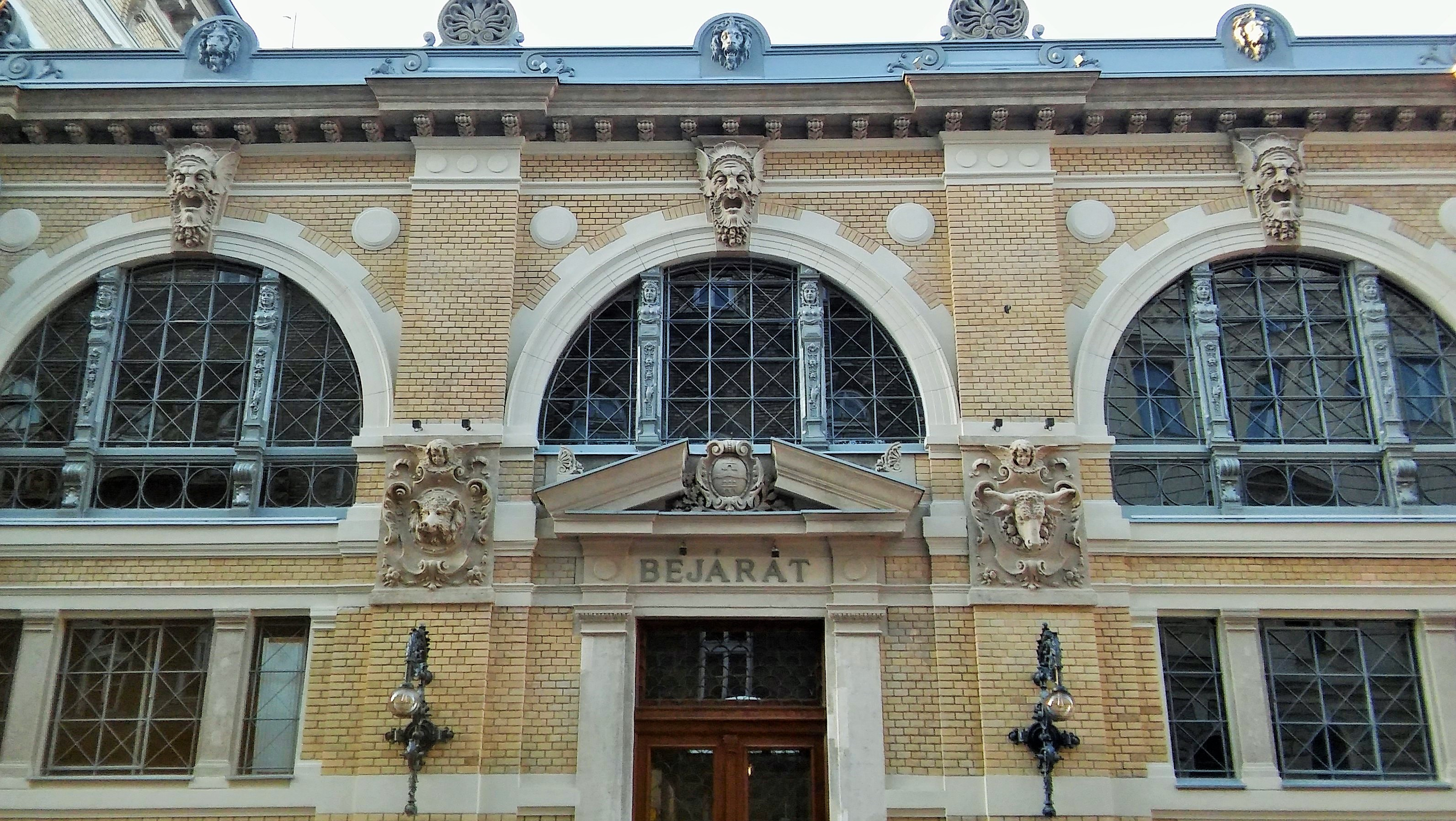

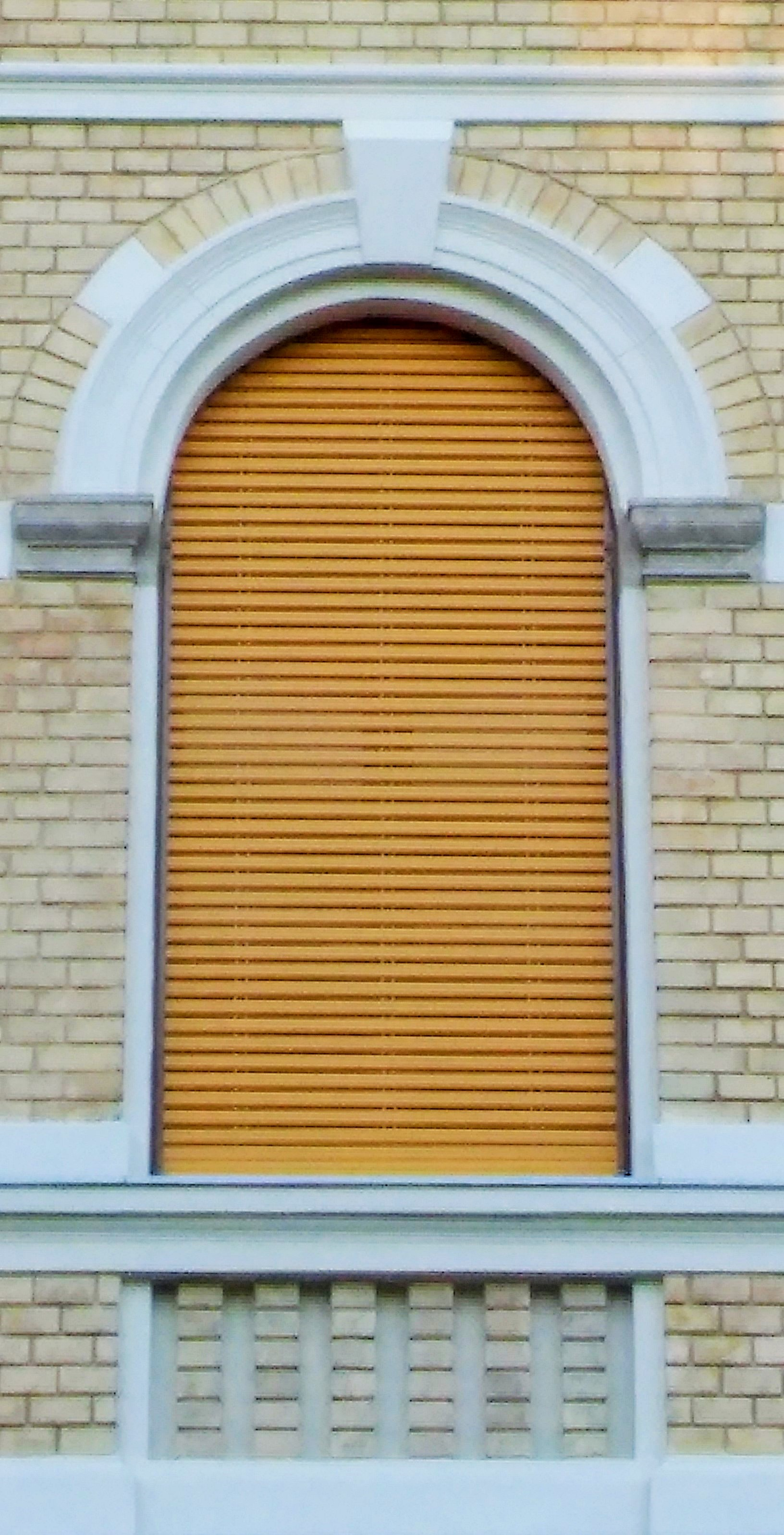

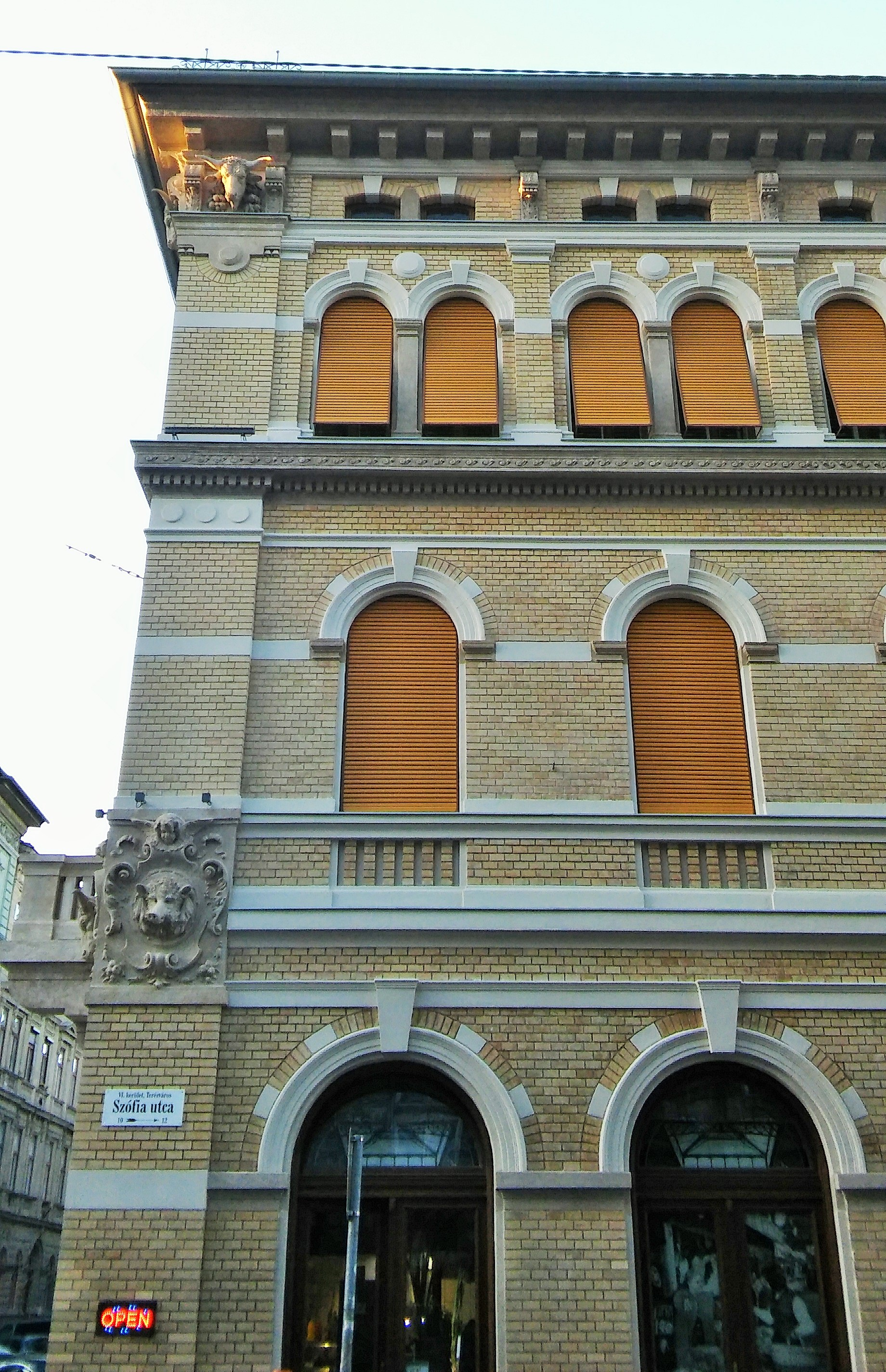

== Sources ==
- http://6.kerulet.ittlakunk.hu/holmi/uzletek/hunyadi-teri-vasarcsarnok
- https://web.archive.org/web/20120721085904/http://mno.hu/belfold/mi-lesz-veled-vasarcsarnok-1044959
- Cikk a Hunyadi térről
- http://www.bpht.hu/historiak/77.pdf
- https://magyarepitok.hu/mi-epul/2019/06/igy-kapja-vissza-regi-fenyet-a-hunyadi-teri-vasarcsarnok-galeria
- http://pestbuda.hu/cikk/20190928_pestbuda_hu_megujult_a_hunyadi_teri_vasarcsarnok_homlokzata
