= András Tállai =

Hungarian economist and politician

Member of the National Assembly
- In office 18 June 1998 – 8 May 2026

Personal details
- Born: 5 February 1959 (age 67) Debrecen, Hungary
- Party: Fidesz (since 1998)
- Children: 2
- Profession: economist, politician

András Tállai (born 5 February 1959) is a Hungarian economist and politician, who served as Secretary of State for Parliamentary Affairs and Taxation, and also Deputy Minister of National Economy (later Finance) from 15 June 2014 to 31 December 2024. He was Secretary of State for Parliamentary Affairs in the Ministry of Agrarian Affairs between 1 January 2025 and 12 May 2026. Prior that he served as the Secretary of State for Municipalities between 2 June 2010 and 5 June 2014. He was also Political Secretary of Finance between 2001 and 2002. He became a member of the National Assembly (MP) for Mezőkövesd (Borsod-Abaúj-Zemplén County Constituency XIII then VII) in the 1998 parliamentary election. He served as Mayor of Mezőkövesd from 2002 to 2010. He holds a degree in business administration from the College of Finance and Accountancy and a degree in tax consulting and auditing. He was President of the National Tax and Customs Administration (NAV) from 2015 to 2018.
