= Ibolya Görög =

Hungarian etiquette expert and coach

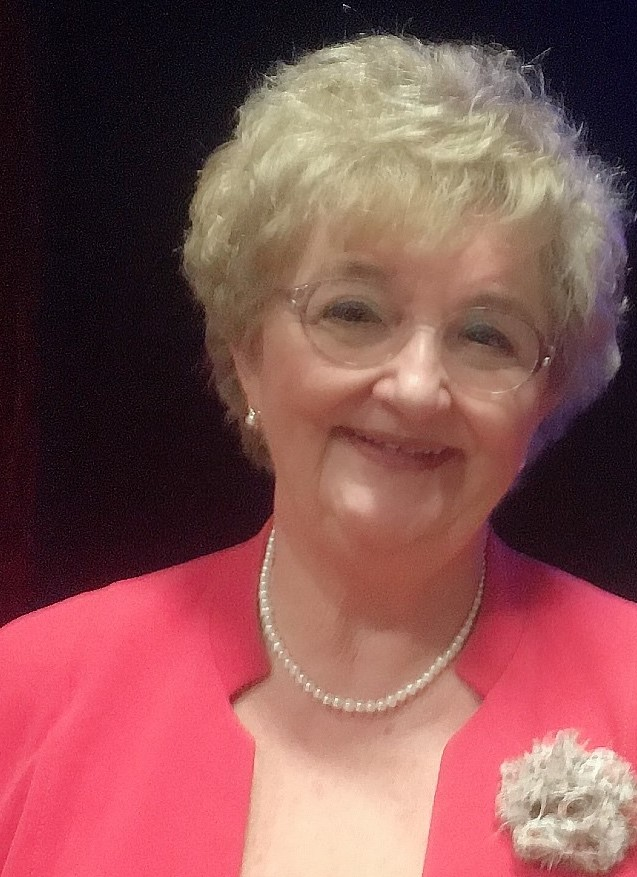
- Born: December 11, 1947 (age 78); Hungary
- Education: Budapest College for Foreign Trade (KKF)
- Known for: Protocol
- Awards: Order of Merit of the Republic of Hungary, Small Cross, 1998
- Scientific career
- Fields: Cultural behavior; etiquette of diplomacy
- Workplaces: University of Szeged; Corvinus University of Budapest; Eszterházy Károly University
- Website: website in English

Ibolya Görög (Hungarian: [ˈibojɒ ˈgørøg]; born 11 December 1947) is a Hungarian etiquette coach and expert, writer, honorary associate professor (docent, reader) at the University of Szeged and the Eszterházy Károly University, former chief of protocol of Hungary at the Prime Minister's Office. Her research and talks focus on cultural behavior and etiquette of diplomacy.

== Early life and education ==
She was born on 11 December 1947, Hungary. She took Bachelor's degree in international studies at the Foreign Language Department at Budapest College for Foreign Trade (until 1971, it has been the International Management and Business College, and from 2001, it is the Faculty of International Management and Business of Budapest Business School).

== Career ==
From 1978 until 1987 she worked at the Institute of Information Systems Management, State University of Management in Moscow.

From January 1987, she became the chief rapporteur, then the deputy head and in 1992 the Head of Department at the Protocol Department of the Secretariat of the Council of Ministers, from 1990 of the Prime Minister's Office.

Since the autumn of 1999, she has been mainly engaged in adult education by her company, G-Protokoll Bt. (limited partnership/LP) but she has been lecturing at the Institution of International Studies, Faculty of Social Sciences, Corvinus University of Budapest for 12 years.

In 2005, the honorific title of associate professor (docent, reader) was conferred upon her both at the University of Szeged and the Eszterházy Károly University.

She has also been lecturering as an etiquette coach & expert both in Hungary, and abroad e.g. in Romania, Slovakia, Russia. She has been invited as a protocol advisor by companies, local cultural institutions and also for media talks.

== Awards and honours ==
- Order of Merit of the Republic of Hungary, Small Cross, 1998
- National Association of Hungarian Journalists, honorary journalist, 2015
- Public Life Award, 2019
- Honorary Citizen of Kőbánya (2020)

== Selected works ==
Books

- Protokoll - az életem (Atheneum, Budapest, 1999)
- Mindennapi maceráink (Atheneum, Budapest, 2000)
- A nyilvánosság kelepcéi (Atheneum, Budapest, 2004)
- Viselkedéskultúra (...és egy kis protokoll) (Temse Kft, Budapest, 2009) – a Temse Kft. által akkreditált, pedagógus-továbbképzési program előadója
- Tanácsoskönyv – Új kalamajkák (Atheneum, Budapest, 2012)
- Wellness - illendően (Nordtúra, Budapest, 2012)
- Viselkedéskultúra (...és egy kis protokoll); 2. jav. kiad. (Azure Arts Informatika Kft., Eger, 2015)
- Protokoll – az életem; 2. átd., bőv. kiad. (Athenaeum, Budapest, 2016)
- Summa Summarum – Európaiság – hitelesség – protokoll (Athenaeum, Budapest, 2018)
