= László Görög =

László Görög may refer to:

- László Görög (writer), American screenwriter
- László Görög (actor), Hungarian actor
