= Győző Czigler =

Hungarian architect and academic (1850–1905)

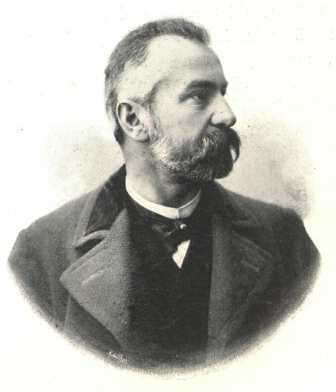
Czigler Győző (1905)

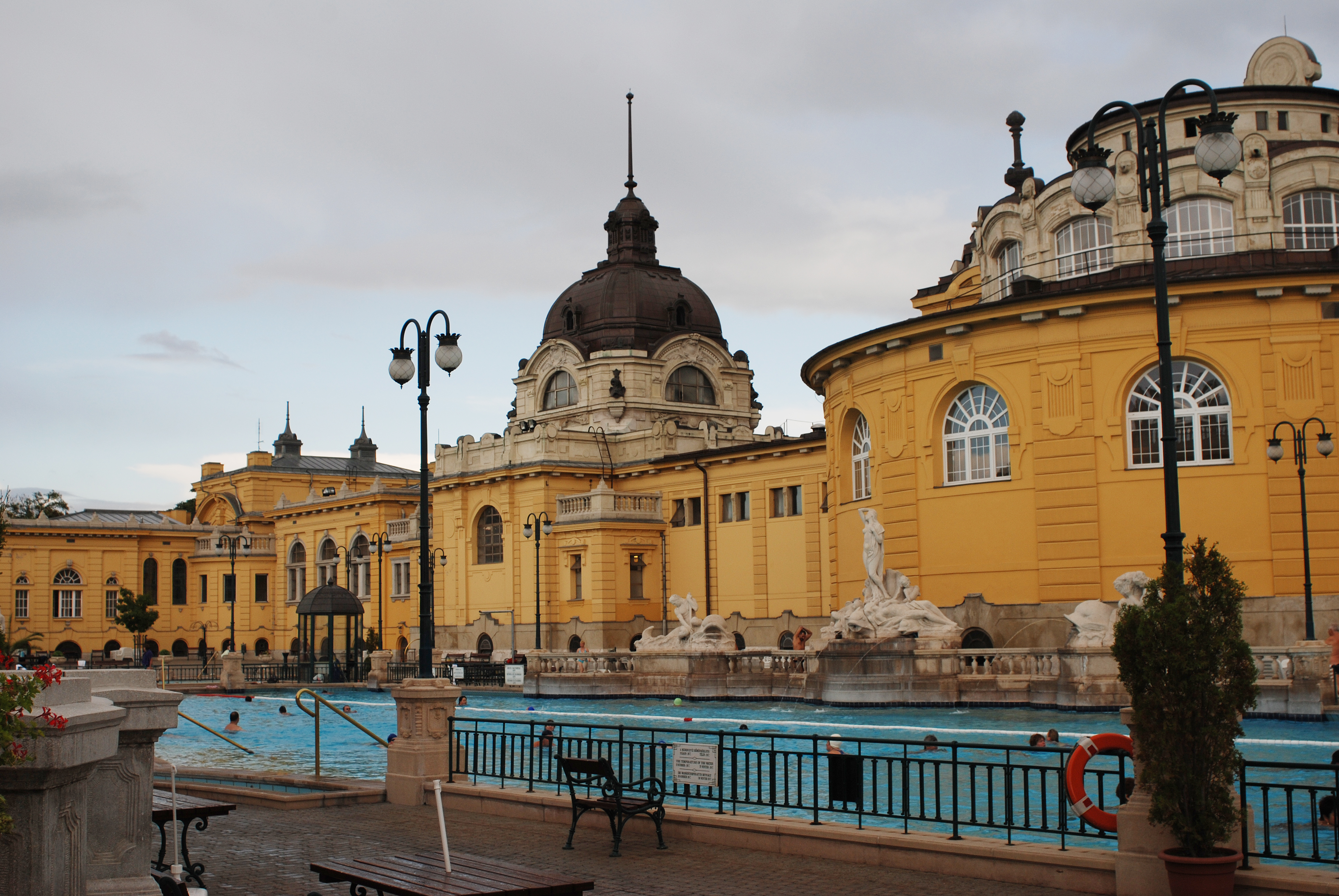
Széchenyi Bath, 1913

Győző Czigler (July 19, 1850 in Arad – March 28, 1905 in Budapest) was a Hungarian architect and academic.

== Life ==
Coming from a long line of architects, Czigler initially studied under his father and then with Theophil Hansen at the Budapest Academy of Fine Arts. He further studied abroad in Germany, the United Kingdom and France; also travelling to Italy, Greece and the Ottoman Empire. He settled in Budapest in 1874 and worked at the department of public works and in 1878 built his first major commission: the Saxlehner palace in Andrassy Avenue. In 1887 he became a fellow of the Budapest Technical University and served as president of the Society of Hungarian Engineers and Builders from 1894 to 1900. He took part in numerous conferences both at home and abroad and authored various technical articles. In terms of style, he represented a conservative bent of the eclectic style which more or less reconstructed various time-worn styles of history.

Among his better known works is the Széchenyi Bath in the City Park in Budapest, which was built after his death in 1905.
