= György Droppa =

Hungarian environmentalist, politician, and economist

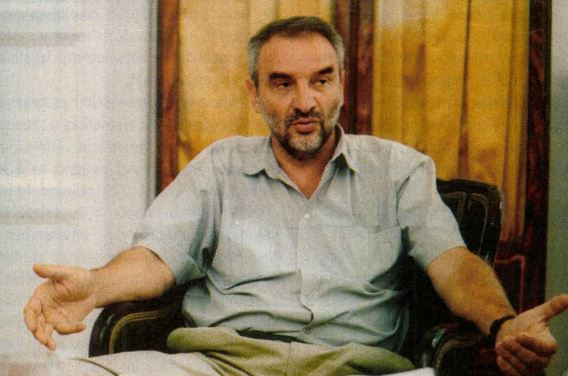
- György Droppa in 2002

President of ZA, ZDSZ and ZB parties
- In office 5 June 1993 – 30 May 2010
- Succeeded by: Gáspár Miklós Tamás (President of ZB)

Personal details
- Born: 17 September 1947 (age 78) Budapest, Hungary
- Party: SZDSZ (1989); MZP (1989–1993); ZA (1993–2000); ZDSZ (2000–2009); ZB (2009– )
- Other political affiliations: EMU (1997–1998); Centrum (2001–2004)
- Profession: environmentalist, politician

György Droppa (born 17 September 1947) is a Hungarian environmentalist, politician and economist, who served as leader of several extra-parliamentary green political parties since the 1990s.

== Early life ==
After finishing university studies, Droppa started his career in the catering industry, working for Panonnia, Danubius and Olimpia hotels. In 1982, he opened his first own restaurant (Fondue Bar) at the Keleti Károly St. which became a popular meeting place among the "democratic opposition" members who criticized the Communist regime. Droppa has enabled to extension of samizdat publications in his restaurant. By 1988, he established further three catering units (Katlan Club, Virányos Club and Jókai Club), where several opposition events and rallies took place. During the transition process, he was a founding member of the re-established Hungarian Catering Corporation.

In June 2009, the 1956 Institute claimed Droppa, as a member of the opposition party SZDSZ, was one of the state authority's 181 informer agents at the reburial of Imre Nagy and his martyr companions on 16 June 1989. Droppa rejected the accusation and expressed the possibility of a lawsuit. Later János M. Rainer, head of the institute backtracked from their standpoint and stated "there is no evidence that the state security organs did indeed looking for him and Droppa handed over reports."

== Political career ==
Droppa was one of the founders of the Duna Kör in 1984, which established as a protest body to prevent the construction of the Gabčíkovo–Nagymaros Dams. In 1990, he became chargé d'affaires of the organization. He joined the Alliance of Free Democrats (SZDSZ) for a short time in 1989. In November 1989, he participated in the foundation of the Green Party of Hungary (MZP). Following the radical right-wing ideological turnout within the party by 1993, Droppa and several other environmentalist members decided to quit the party to establish the Green Alternative (ZA), with election of Droppa and Erzsébet Schmuck as its co-leaders. However the new party was unsuccessful at the 1994 parliamentary election, receiving only 0.02 percent of the votes.

In January 1994, the ZA was admitted into the European Federation of Green Parties, which established under this name few months earlier. Despite the lack of domestic support, György Droppa was also elected to the European political party's leadership, holding his position as "key figure of the green politics" until 2009. In that capacity, Droppa established a good relationship with the GroenLinks, a prominent Dutch member of the federation. Beside that, Droppa also served as Director of the ISTER – East European Environmental Research between 1993 and 1997. In September 1997, ZA joined the Union for Hungary electoral alliance, dominated by the Republican Party, however it did not gain any seats in the 1998 parliamentary election. Following the defeat, Droppa and Márta Márczis were elected co-presidents of the ZA.

On 3 June 2000, the ZA merged with the Social Democracy 2000 Foundation to form the Alliance of Green Democrats (ZDSZ). The ZDSZ joined the Centre Party (or Centrum), with Droppa elected to its leadership, for the 2002 parliamentary election, but remained unsuccessful. In the 2002 local elections, Droppa was the Centrum's candidate for the position of Mayor of Budapest, but received only 0.59 percent of the votes and came to the fifth place. On 16 November 2003, the ZDSZ transformed itself into a party alliance by merging several other minor movements. The Védegylet, the Clean Air Action Group and other environmentalist NGOs rejected Droppa's integration efforts. On 31 December 2004, the ZDSZ left the Centre Party. The party could run only one representative at the 2006 parliamentary election.

Droppa's leading role in the Hungarian section of the green movement had declined with the appearance and formation of the Politics Can Be Different (LMP). In reaction to this, the ZDSZ and the Workers' Party of Hungary 2006, merged into the Green Left and Droppa elected as its first president. However, despite the fact that LMP was not yet a member of the European Green Party, its key leader Daniel Cohn-Bendit personally expressed his sympathy and support to the new green-liberal organization for the 2009 European Parliament election. Cohn-Bendit said "I do not trust György Droppa anymore. For years, he keeps saying the same, and now it was enough. I do not see that there is a lot of chance to [Droppa] to take the necessary twenty thousand recommendation slips." Cohn-Bendit also criticized Droppa for his party having merged with a Marxist movement. While LMP jumped over the electoral threshold in the 2010 parliamentary election, Droppa's Green Left received only 0.03% of the votes. Following the election, Droppa was replaced as party president by neo-Marxist philosopher Gáspár Miklós Tamás.

== Sources ==
- Vida, István (2011). Magyarországi politikai pártok lexikona (1846–2010) [Encyclopedia of the Political Parties in Hungary (1846–2010)] (in Hungarian). Gondolat Kiadó. ISBN 978-963-693-276-3.
