= Green Party of Hungary =

Greens, the Party of Normal People Zöldek, a Normális Emberek Pártja
- President: László Brezovits (1990–1993); Zoltán Medveczki (1993–)
- Founded: 19 November 1989
- Paramilitary wing: Alliance of National Green Youth
- Ideology: Green conservatism Environmentalism; After 1993: Ecofascism; Euroscepticism
- Political position: Right-wing to far-right
- Colours: Green

Website
- https://zoldallam.hu/

The Greens, the Party of Normal People (Hungarian: Zöldek, a Normális Emberek Pártja; ZÖLDEK), also commonly referred to by its shortened form, the Green Party, is the first green political party in Hungary and also in post-communist countries, formed on 19 November 1989 following the end of communism.

== History ==
Several former active members of the Duna Kör had participated in the foundation of the Green Party of Hungary (Hungarian: Magyarországi Zöld Párt; MZP) in Budapest on 19 November 1989. The first branches had already established in Debrecen (23 October) and Szeged (8 November). The national congress elected a 15-member national board and 7-member presidency (its members were including Gábor Hraskó and Erzsébet Schmuck). The MZP did not have a strong central management, two centers of power emerged (Southern Transdanubia and Cisdanubia). After the failure 1990 election, the Debrecen branch led by Árpád Kotsis left the party to establish the Regional Green Party of Hungary (MRZP). When Zoltán Medveczki became Party President in March 1993, the party gradually changed its political position from moderate to radical right-wing. The MZP adopted anti-liberal, anti-communist, anti-Semitic and pro-fascist elements to its program and also criticized privatization and market economy. Medveczki also founded and registered the party's paramilitary wing, the Alliance of National Green Youth.

Despite its green ideology, the MZP under Medveczki supported the construction and expansion of the Gabčíkovo–Nagymaros Dams. They rejected Hungary's join to the North Atlantic Treaty Organization (NATO). On 5 June 1993, critics of Medveczki's politics, quit the party and established the Green Alternative (ZA), led by György Droppa. In November 1995, Ottó Stekler also decided to left MZP to found the Hungarian Social Green Party (MSZZP). The MZP remained unsuccessful in the forthcoming elections. In 2003, the party campaigned against Hungary's against joining the European Union. Before the 2006 parliamentary election, it joined the electoral coalition of Centre Party, but did not gain any seats.

In August 2011, they renamed to Hungarian Environmentalists' Party (Hungarian: Magyar Környezetvédők Pártja, MAKÖP). Medveczki ran for mayor in Paks in 2017, achieving 2.22% of the vote. In Medveczki registered a new party called Greens, the Party of Normal People (Hungarian: Zöldek, a Normális Emberek Pártja). He ran once again in the 2020 Fejér County 4th constituency by-election gaining 0.7%.

== Election results ==
=== National Assembly ===
Election year	National Assembly				Government
Election year	# of overall votes	% of overall vote	# of overall seats won	+/–	Government
1990	17,951	0.36%	0 / 386		extra-parliamentary
1994	8,813	0.16%	0 / 386	0	extra-parliamentary
1998	1,758	0.04%	0 / 386	0	extra-parliamentary
2002	2,221	0.04%	0 / 386	0	extra-parliamentary
2006	Centre Party		0 / 386	0	extra-parliamentary

== Sources ==
- Vida, István (2011). "Magyarországi Zöld Párt (MZP)". Magyarországi politikai pártok lexikona (1846–2010) [Encyclopedia of the Political Parties in Hungary (1846–2010)] (in Hungarian). Gondolat Kiadó. pp. 430–432. ISBN 978-963-693-276-3.
