= Green Alternative (Hungary) =

Green Alternative Zöld Alternatíva
- Co-Presidents: György Droppa (1993–2000); Erzsébet Schmuck (1993–1998); Márta Márczis (1998–2000)
- Founded: 5 June 1993
- Dissolved: 3 June 2000
- Split from: Green Party of Hungary
- Succeeded by: Alliance of Green Democrats
- Newspaper: Zöld Alternatíva
- Ideology: Green politics Environmentalism
- Political position: Centre
- European affiliation: European Federation of Green Parties

The Green Alternative (Hungarian: Zöld Alternatíva, pronounced [ˈzøld ˈɒltɛrnɒtiːvɒ]; ZA), later Green Alternative – Alliance of Greens in Hungary, was a green political party in Hungary between 1993 and 2000.

== History ==
Following the radical right-wing ideological turnout within the Green Party of Hungary (MZP), several environmentalist members decided to left the party and establish the Green Alternative in June 1993 during their first congress at the University of Horticulture (today a faculty within the Corvinus University of Budapest). The congress elected György Droppa (a former Duna Kör and SZDSZ member) and Erzsébet Schmuck (a former KISZ member) as co-presidents. In January 1994, MDF politician and MP Károly Jávor (father of MEP Benedek Jávor) joined the ZA, providing parliamentary representation for the party for few months until the 1994 parliamentary election, when ZA received only 0.02 percent of the votes. In the second round, ZA entered into an electoral alliance with the Agrarian Alliance (ASZ), but did not gain any individual seats.

In the forthcoming years, the Green Alternative protested against the constructions of Gabčíkovo–Nagymaros Dams, a landfill in Pécel and the operations of the uranium mine in Pécs, the alumina plant in Lábatlan and the Paks Nuclear Power Plant. In September 1997, it joined the electoral alliance Union for Hungary, dominated by the Republican Party, however they received only 0.19 percent of the votes in the 1998 parliamentary election. The coalition broke up after that. Erzsébet Schmuck left the party on 21 June 1998, she was replaced by Márta Márczis (mother of Benedek Jávor) as co-president. On 3 June 2000, the ZA merged with the Social Democracy 2000 Foundation to form the Alliance of Green Democrats (ZDSZ).

== International relations ==
In January 1994, the ZA was admitted into the European Federation of Green Parties, which established under this name few months earlier. György Droppa was also elected to the European political party's leadership. In that capacity, Droppa established a good relationship with the GreenLeft, a prominent Dutch member of the federation.

== Election results ==
=== National Assembly ===
Election year	National Assembly				Government
Election year	# of overall votes	% of overall vote	# of overall seats won	+/–	Government
1994	849	0.02%	0 / 386		extra-parliamentary
1998	Union for Hungary		0 / 386	0	extra-parliamentary

== Sources ==
- Vida, István (2011). "Zöld Alternatíva (ZA)". Magyarországi politikai pártok lexikona (1846–2010) [Encyclopedia of the Political Parties in Hungary (1846–2010)] (in Hungarian). Gondolat Kiadó. pp. 466–468. ISBN 978-963-693-276-3.
