= Alliance of Green Democrats =

Alliance of Green Democrats Zöld Demokraták Szövetsége
- President: György Droppa
- Founded: 3 June 2000
- Dissolved: 28 February 2009
- Merger of: ZA and SD2000
- Succeeded by: Green Left
- Newspaper: Zöld Alternatíva
- Ideology: Green politics Environmentalism
- Political position: Centre
- European affiliation: European Green Party
- International affiliation: Global Greens

Website
- zd.hu (archived)

The Alliance of Green Democrats (Hungarian: Zöld Demokraták Szövetsége, pronounced [ˈzøld ˈdɛmokrɒtaːk ˈsøvɛt͡ʃːeːɡɛ]; ZDSZ), was a green political party in Hungary between 2000 and 2009.

== History ==
It was established by the merger of Green Alternative (ZA), Social Democracy 2000 Foundation (SD2000) and the Social Democrat Youth Movement (SZIM) on 3 June 2000. György Droppa (ZA) and István Podkoniczky (SD2000) were elected co-presidents, several leaving members of the Hungarian Social Democratic Party (MSZDP) had joined the newly established organization. In autumn 2001, the entrepreneur faction of the party led by Károly Garabits were entirely expelled from the party by a court decision after internal party conflicts. ZDSZ joined the Centre Party for the 2002 parliamentary election, but did not gain any seats. In the 2002 local elections, Droppa was the Centre's candidate for the position of Mayor of Budapest, but received only 0.59 percent of the votes and came to the fifth place.

On 16 November 2003, the Green Democrats transformed itself into a party alliance by merging the Social Democratic Party of Environmentalists (KSZDP), the Party of Hungarian Women (MNP), the Hungarian Social Green Party (MSZZP), the Alliance of Greens (ZSZ) and the New Left Party (ÚBP). The Védegylet, the Clean Air Action Group and several other environmentalist NGOs rejected the integration efforts of ZDSZ. On 31 December 2004, the ZDSZ left the Centre Party. Just before the 2006 parliamentary election, several rural organizations of the party left ZDSZ to establish the Party of Greens. As a result, only one candidate run under ZDSZ banner. On 28 March 2009, ZDSZ, along with European Feminist Initiative for a Different Europe and Workers' Party of Hungary 2006, merged into the Green Left, in a reaction to the foundation of the Politics Can Be Different (LMP). Before that the ZDSZ rejected the cooperation with the LMP civilian initiative.

== Election results ==
=== National Assembly ===
Election year	National Assembly				Government
Election year	# of overall votes	% of overall vote	# of overall seats won	+/–	Government
2002	Centre Party		0 / 386		extra-parliamentary
2006	95	0.0 %	0 / 386	0	extra-parliamentary

== Sources ==
- Vida, István (2011). "Zöld Demokraták Szövetsége (ZDSZ)". Magyarországi politikai pártok lexikona (1846–2010) [Encyclopedia of the Political Parties in Hungary (1846–2010)] (in Hungarian). Gondolat Kiadó. pp. 469–470. ISBN 978-963-693-276-3.
