= Iván Szabó =

Hungarian politician (1934–2005)

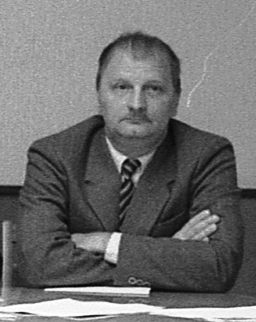

Minister of Finance of Hungary
- In office 24 February 1993 – 15 July 1994
- Prime Minister: József Antall; Péter Boross
- Preceded by: Mihály Kupa
- Succeeded by: László Békesi

Personal details
- Born: 8 January 1934 Budapest, Kingdom of Hungary
- Died: 4 August 2005 (aged 71) Budapest, Hungary
- Party: MDF, MDNP, Centre Party
- Children: 2
- Profession: politician, economist

Iván Szabó (8 January 1934 – 4 August 2005) was a Hungarian politician, who served as Minister of Finance between 1993 and 1994. He joined to the Hungarian Democratic Forum in 1988. He was chosen to the party's presidency in 1990. After the death of József Antall (1993) he served as manager president. Szabó was member of the National Assembly of Hungary since 1990. Between June 1990 and December 1991 he served as the Chairman of the Assembly's Economical Committee. He was appointed Minister of Industry, Trade and Tourism in 1991. He became faction leader in 1994.

Szabó entered for the party's presidential election in 1996 but was beaten by Sándor Lezsák. After that Szabó and some other prominent members (György Szabad) left the party. They founded the Hungarian Democratic People's Party (MDNP) and Szabó appointed the new party's first president and faction leader. The MDNP did not hit the 5% threshold contrary at the 1998 election, that's why Szabó resigned from his position. He was a founding member of the Centre Party in 2001.

Political offices
Preceded by Péter Ákos Bod	Minister of Industry and Trade; 1991–1993	Succeeded by János Latorcai
Preceded by Mihály Kupa	Minister of Finance; 1993–1994	Succeeded by László Békesi
National Assembly of Hungary
Preceded by Ferenc Kulin	Leader of the MDF parliamentary group 1994–1996	Succeeded by Ervin Demeter
Preceded by First	Leader of the MDNP parliamentary group 1996–1998	Succeeded by Last
