= Party of Greens (Hungary) =

Party of Greens Zöldek Pártja
- President: László Ács
- Founded: 22 January 2006
- Dissolved: October 2022
- Split from: Alliance of Green Democrats
- Ideology: Green politics
- National Assembly: 0 / 199
- European Parliament: 0 / 21

Website
- zoldekpartja.hu

The Party of Greens (Hungarian: Zöldek Pártja, pronounced [ˈzøldɛk ˈpaːrcɒ]; ZÖP), or simply Greens, was a green political party in Hungary, founded in January 2006.

== History ==
The Party of Greens was established in Szeghalom on 22 January 2006 by some rural branches of the Alliance of Green Democrats (ZDSZ) under the leadership of entrepreneur László Ács, who quit ZDSZ just before the 2006 parliamentary election. In the following weeks, other ZDSZ organizations joined the new party. ZÖP adopted its program from the ZDSZ, in which demanded the rationalization of energy management and development of agricultural techniques protecting the environment. ZÖP had 11 individual candidates and 3 county regional lists in the 2006 parliamentary election, where received 2,870 votes (0.05%). By contrast, György Droppa's ZDSZ gained only 95 votes. The ZÖP did not run in the 2009 European Parliament election and the 2010 parliamentary election.

ZÖP re-activated itself for the 2014 parliamentary election. The party was able to nominee 33 individual candidates, including former astronaut Bertalan Farkas, and a national list. Finally, the ZÖP received 18,557 votes (0.37%), alongside the Hungarian Workers' Party, the only extra-parliamentary party which obtained more votes than required proposal coupons. In October 2022, the party was liquidated.

== Election results ==
=== National Assembly ===
Election	Leader	SMCs		MMCs		Seats	+/–	Status
Election	Leader	Votes	%	Votes	%	Seats	+/–	Status
2006	László Ács	4,678	0.09% (#13)	2,870	0.05% (#9)	0 / 199	New	Extra-parliamentary
2010	László Ács	Did not contest						
Election	Leader	Constituency		Party list		Seats	+/–	Status
Election	Leader	Votes	%	Votes	%	Seats	+/–	Status
2014	László Ács	9,392	0.19% (#12)	18,557	0.37% (#8)	0 / 199	0	Extra-parliamentary
2018	László Ács	Did not contest						
2022	László Ács	208	0.00% (#11)	—		0 / 199	0	Extra-parliamentary

== Sources ==
- Vida, István (2011). "Zöldek Pártja (ZÖP)". Magyarországi politikai pártok lexikona (1846–2010) [Encyclopedia of the Political Parties in Hungary (1846–2010)] (in Hungarian). Gondolat Kiadó. p. 471. ISBN 978-963-693-276-3.
