= MDNP =

MDNP may refer to:

- Mid Dorset and North Poole (UK Parliament constituency), a parliamentary constituency in South West England
- Hungarian Democratic People's Party, a former political party in Hungary
