= Gabčíkovo =

Gabčíkovo Bős
- Municipality
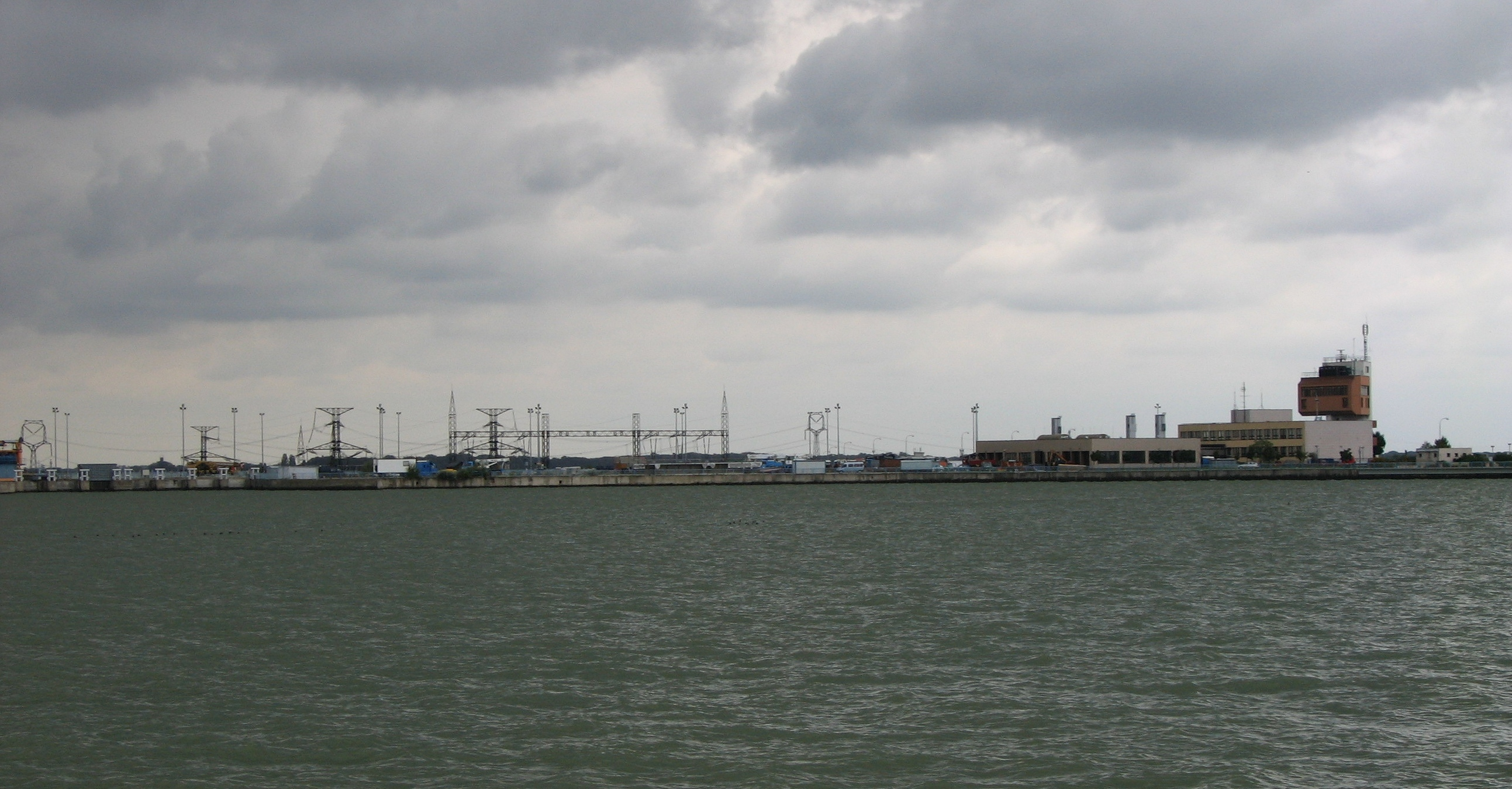
- Gabčíkovo Dam

- Flag Coat of arms
- Etymology: named after Jozef Gabčík
- Location of Gabčíkovo in the Trnava Region Location of Gabčíkovo in Slovakia
- Coordinates: 47.90°N 17.58°E
- Country: Slovakia
- Region: Trnava Region
- District: Dunajská Streda District
- First mentioned: 1264

Government
  - Mayor: Iván Fenes (SMK-MKP)

Area
  - Total: 52.39 km^{2} (20.23 sq mi)
- Elevation: 114 m (374 ft)

Population (2025)
  - Total: 5,300

Ethnicity
- Time zone: UTC+1 (CET)
  - Summer (DST): UTC+2 (CEST)
- Postal code: 930 05
- Area code: +421 31
- Vehicle registration plate (until 2022): DS
- Website: www.gabcikovo.sk

Gabčíkovo (Hungarian: Bős, pronounced [ˈbøːʃ]) is a town and municipality in the Dunajská Streda District, in the Trnava Region of southwestern Slovakia. It has 5,232 inhabitants of whom approximately 80% are Hungarians. After the Communist takeover of Czechoslovakia, the city was named after Jozef Gabčík, an important figure in the Czechoslovak resistance to Nazi occupation.

== Name ==
The Hungarian name of the town was first recorded in 1102 as Beys and preserves the name of its erstwhile Pecheneg inhabitants, pecheneg being besenyő in Hungarian. The town appears in several documents between 1262 and 1274 as a borderguard Pecheneg settlement.

The current Slovak name of the town was given by the authorities in 1948 after Jozef Gabčík, a Slovak soldier involved in Operation Anthropoid, the assassination of Reinhard Heydrich, Deputy Reich-Protector of Bohemia and Moravia.

== Geography ==
The municipality lies at an altitude of 114 metres (374 ft) and covers an area of 52.39 km^{2} (20.23 sq mi) (2025).

Gabčíkovo is situated along the Danube river on the border with Hungary, in the southern part of Great Rye Island around 12 km south of Dunajská Streda bordered by Baka to the west, Vrakúň to the east, Pataš, Baloň, Sap and Ňárad to the southeast, and the Hungarian villages of Lipót and Ásványráró to the southwest. Administratively, the village belongs to the Trnava Region, Dunajská Streda District.

Near to the village, there is the main part of the Gabčíkovo Waterworks, which is the reason for a long-term dispute between Hungary and the Slovak Republic.

== History ==
In the 10th century, the territory of Gabčíkovo became part of the Kingdom of Hungary. In 1468, Hungarian king Matthias Corvinus gave Gabčíkovo, then known as Bős, the right of organizing a fair. It was part of Hungary and later Austria Hungary until the Treaty of Trianon. No plebiscites were allowed to take place despite the overwhelming majority of the population being Hungarian.

After the Austro-Hungarian army disintegrated in November 1918, Czechoslovak troops occupied the area, later acknowledged internationally by the Treaty of Trianon. Between 1938 and 1945 Bős once more became part of Miklós Horthy's Hungary through the First Vienna Award. From 1945 until the Velvet Divorce, it was part of Czechoslovakia. Since then it has been part of Slovakia.

== Population ==
Population statistic (10 years)
| Year | 1995 | 2005 | 2015 | 2025 |
|---|---|---|---|---|
| Count | 4974 | 5110 | 5382 | 5300 |
| Difference | | +2.73% | +5.32% | −1.52% |

Population statistic
| Year | 2024 | 2025 |
|---|---|---|
| Count | 5290 | 5300 |
| Difference | | +0.18% |

It has a population of 5300 people (31 December 2025).

In 1910, it had a population of 2823 of whom 2805 (99.36%) were listed as Hungarians (included Jews and Slovaks in the state service). After the Treaty of Trianon, more Slovaks started to move into the area.

=== Ethnicity ===
Census 2021 (1+ %)
| Ethnicity | Number | Fraction |
|---|---|---|
| Hungarian | 4323 | 82.62% |
| Slovak | 829 | 15.84% |
| Not found out | 303 | 5.79% |
| Total | 5232 | |

In year 2021 was 5232 people by ethnicity 4323 as Hungarian, 829 as Slovak, 303 as Not found out, 21 as Czech, 7 as Russian, 7 as Polish, 7 as Moravian, 7 as Other, 6 as Serbian, 3 as German, 2 as Ukrainian, 2 as Romanian, 2 as Croatian, 1 as Jewish and 1 as Rusyn.

Note on population: The difference values of population numbers in the table "Population statistic" and in the sections "Ethnicity" & "Religion" is caused by the use of various statistical methods.

=== Religion ===
Census 2021 (1+ %)
| Religion | Number | Fraction |
|---|---|---|
| Roman Catholic Church | 3961 | 75.71% |
| None | 675 | 12.9% |
| Not found out | 243 | 4.64% |
| Calvinist Church | 160 | 3.06% |
| Total | 5232 | |

In year 2021 was 5232 people by religion 3961 from Roman Catholic Church, 675 from None, 243 from Not found out, 160 from Calvinist Church, 51 from Evangelical Church, 50 from Greek Catholic Church, 37 from Christian Congregations in Slovakia, 12 from Other and not ascertained christian church, 11 from Eastern Orthodox Church, 11 from Buddhism, 9 from Old Catholic Church, 7 from Other, 2 from Islam, 1 from Jewish community, 1 from Hinduism and 1 from Ad hoc movements.

== Genealogical resources ==
The records for genealogical research are available at the state archive "Statny Archiv in Bratislava, Slovakia"

- Roman Catholic church records (births/marriages/deaths): 1720-1896 (parish A)

== Twin towns – sister cities ==
Gabčíkovo is twinned with:

- Enese, Hungary
- Kondoros, Hungary
- Mihăileni, Romania
- Nagymaros, Hungary
- Pázmándfalu, Hungary
