= Hungarian Democratic People's Party =

Hungarian Democratic People's Party Magyar Demokrata Néppárt
- Leader: Iván Szabó
- Founded: 4 March 1996
- Dissolved: 2 April 2005
- Split from: Hungarian Democratic Forum
- Merged into: Hungarian Democratic Forum
- Ideology: Conservatism; Christian democracy
- Political position: Centre-right

Website
- www.mdnp.hu (archived)

The Hungarian Democratic People's Party (Hungarian: Magyar Demokrata Néppárt, pronounced [ˈmɒɟɒr ˈdɛmokrɒtɒ ˈneːpːaːrt]; MDNP) was a political party in Hungary between 1996 and 2005.

== History ==
The national conservative party formed on 4 March 1996, when Iván Szabó and his supporters left Hungarian Democratic Forum (MDF) following Szabó's defeat against Sándor Lezsák at the party leadership election. 15 MPs, including several prominent politicians, such as György Szabad, Géza Jeszenszky and Imre Kónya, formed a parliamentary group and Szabó became its leader.

The MDNP did not hit the 5% threshold contrary at the 1998 parliamentary election, as a result Szabó resigned from his position. He was replaced by Erzsébet Pusztai. Under her leadership, the party joined the moderate centre alliance of Christian Democratic People's Party (KDNP), Alliance of Green Democrats (ZDSZ) and Third Way for Hungary (HOM), which formed Centre Party (Hungarian: Centrum). Mihály Kupa's alliance won 3.9% of the popular vote and no seats at the 2002 parliamentary election.

József Szabó was elected the new president of the MDNP in June 2002. MDNP supported MDF at 2004 European Parliament election. The unusual alliance of centre-right and centre-left groups hindered the Centre Party's effectiveness and, eventually, two of the founding political formations, KDNP and MDNP quit the party on 31 December 2004. the Hungarian Democratic People's Party re-merged with the Hungarian Democratic Forum on 2 April 2005.

== Presidents of the MDNP ==
- Iván Szabó (1996–1998)
- Erzsébet Pusztai (1998–2002)
- József Szabó (2002–2005)

== Parliamentary representation ==
The 15-member parliamentary group of Hungarian Democratic People's Party formed on 11 March 1996:

Leader

- Iván Szabó, Minister of Finance (1993–1994)

Deputy Leaders

- Erzsébet Pusztai, later President of the MDNP (1998–2002)
- György Raskó agrarian entrepreneur
- György Szabad, Speaker of the National Assembly (1990–1994)

Members

- Etelka Barsi-Pataky, Member of the European Parliament (2004–2009)
- László Bogár economist, publicist
- Gabriella Farkas jurist
- Géza Jeszenszky, Minister of Foreign Affairs (1990–1994)
- Tamás Katona, Mayor of Budavár (1994–1998)
- Imre Kónya, Ministry of Interior (1993–1994)
- Katalin Kónya-Kutrucz jurist, wife of Imre Kónya
- Ferenc Kulin, Leader of the MDF parliamentary group (1993–1994)
- Tamás Szabó, Minister for Privatisation (1992–1994)
- Tihamér Tóth jurist
- Attila Zsigmond, Director-General of Budapest Gallery

== Electoral results ==
=== National Assembly ===
Election year	National Assembly				Government
Election year	# of overall votes	% of overall vote	# of overall seats won	+/–	Government
1998	62,568	1.4 % (#9)	0 / 386	▼15	extra-parliamentary
2002^{1}	219,029	3.9 % (#5)	0 / 386	0	extra-parliamentary

^{1} MDNP was a member of the alliance of Centre Party
