= Hungarian Social Green Party =

Hungarian Social Green Party Magyar Szociális Zöld Párt
- President: Ottó Stekler
- Founded: 22 December 1995
- Split from: Green Party of Hungary
- Ideology: Green anarchism Anti-establishment
- Political position: Left-wing
- International affiliation: World Ecological Parties

The Hungarian Social Green Party (Hungarian: Magyar Szociális Zöld Párt; MSZZP), also known its shortened form Green Party, is a green anarchist political party in Hungary, founded in December 1995.

== History ==
On 22 December 1995, Ottó Stekler (husband of fellow politician Mária Seres) and his followers left the Green Party of Hungary (MZP) to form the MSZZP in Nyíregyháza. During the foundation, the party described itself as an "anti-party", with several green anarchists and anti-establishment elements in its programme. In the 1998 parliamentary election, the MSZZP was able to set up a regional list in Szabolcs-Szatmár-Bereg County and obtained the 0.05 percent of votes, thus won no seats. The party skipped the 2002 parliamentary election.

By the 2006 parliamentary election, the MSZZP became known of its guerrilla campaign methods and media PR campaigns and performances, having entered into cooperation with infamous far-right blogger Tamás Polgár (Tomcat). For instance, young activists of the party tried to attack Fidesz politician Zoltán Pokorni with pillows during a campaign event in Püspökladány, but the event organizers have prevented this. Previously the party activists also tried to disturb the campaign speech of Gábor Demszky, the Mayor of Budapest, by throwing a cake at his face. The MSZZP also released a video record which claimed system-wide counterfeiting of proposal coupons took place at the Hungarian Socialist Party (MSZP) headquarters. Protesting against the electoral system, MSZZP activists burned their proposal coupons in front of the Hungarian Parliament Building.

The MSZZP intended to run in the February 2009 Ferencváros parliamentary by-election and nominated Tamás Polgár as their candidate. However, the Metropolitan Court rejected Polgár's entrance because 1152 proposal coupons out of 1165 pieces proved to be invalid.

== Election results ==
=== National Assembly ===
Election year	National Assembly				Government
Election year	# of overall votes	% of overall vote	# of overall seats won	+/–	Government
1998	3,052	0.07%	0 / 386		extra-parliamentary

== Sources ==
- Vida, István (2011). "Magyar Szociális Zöld Párt (MSZZP)". Magyarországi politikai pártok lexikona (1846–2010) [Encyclopedia of the Political Parties in Hungary (1846–2010)] (in Hungarian). Gondolat Kiadó. p. 418. ISBN 978-963-693-276-3.
