= Táncsics – Radical Left Party =

Hungarian political party

Táncsics – Radical Left Party Táncsics – Radikális Balpárt
- Founded: 13 March 2014
- Dissolved: 2023
- Headquarters: Budapest, Hungary
- Ideology: Democratic socialism
- Political position: Left-wing
- European affiliation: Party of the European Left (partner)
- Colors: Red and black

The Táncsics – Radical Left Party (Hungarian: Táncsics – Radikális Balpárt) was a left-wing democratic socialist political party in Hungary. It was formed at a meeting in March 2014. It drew its membership from different civil society organizations as well as former members of the Hungarian Socialist Party and the Green Left.

The party's aim is to build an independent leftist political force in Hungarian politics based upon social solidarity and following the examples of different leftist parties elsewhere in Europe, such as SYRIZA in Greece and Die Linke in Germany. The party is also trying to build a closer alliance between radical leftist parties in Eastern Europe. The founding statements refer to the Left Party playing an important role in an 'ethical renewal' which they say is needed in Hungary in the next few years.

On 8 September 2016, the party announced on its website that it would cooperate with the Workers' Party of Hungary 2006 in preparation for the 2018 parliamentary election.

In April 2019, the youth organisation of the Workers' Party of Hungary 2006, which named after Mihály Táncsics, split from it and joined the Left Party. After the unification congress in June 2019, the party changed its name to "Táncsics – Radical Left Party".

The party last logged in on its social media platform in 2021, and has not been active since then. In 2023, the organization went into liquidation.
