= Social Democratic Party (Hungary) =

Social Democratic Party Szociáldemokrata Párt
- Founded: 21 November 1989
- Dissolved: February 2013
- Split from: MSZDP
- Headquarters: Budapest
- Newspaper: Magyar Nép Szava
- Ideology: Social democracy
- Political position: Centre-left
- Colours: Red, White

Website
- https://www.szdp.hu/

The Social Democratic Party (Hungarian: Szociáldemokrata Párt, pronounced [ˈsot͡sijaːldɛmokrɒtɒ ˈpaːrt], SZDP) often known as the "Historic" Social Democratic Party ("történelmi" Szociáldemokrata Párt [ˈtørteːnɛlmi ˈsot͡sijaːldɛmokrɒtɒ ˈpaːrt], tSZDP) was a small Hungarian political party now considered to be practically defunct. It emerged following a split within the Hungarian Social Democratic Party (MSZDP) in 1989. Both the SZDP and MSZDP lay claim to the same heritage: the Social Democratic Party which was part of a governing coalition in Hungary between 1945 and 1948, and a short period in 1956, which itself was renamed from the Hungarian Social Democratic Party, previously established in 1890. Traditional areas of support were the industrial areas of Budapest, especially Óbuda, Pesterzsébet and Angyalföld.

== History ==
=== Split from MSZDP and aftermath ===
Originally a very small breakaway from the MSZDP, Imre Takács and the other founders were joined by many individuals who left the MSZDP in 1997. They objected to the increasingly centralised leadership style of László Kapolyi, by now funding and leading the MSZDP into a close association with the formerly communist MSZP. Among this group of new recruits were a number of veterans from the post-war coalition of 1945-1948 and the government of Imre Nagy, such as Róbert Gábor, Sándor Bácskai and Ernő Nagy.

Electorally, the SZDP have remained a marginal party, with some limited success in local elections. Under the co-leadership of Mátyás Szűrös from 2003 to 2005 the party took a sharp turn towards populism and the right-wing Fidesz party. By the time Szűrös was finally forced out in 2005 the party had suffered a loss in any remaining credibility.

In April 2009, the party announced that Anna Petrasovits, leader of the MSZDP from 1989 to 1992 would lead the party's list for the European Parliament elections in June 2009. This failed to culminate in the necessary number of nominations from voters. Following this failed attempt, infighting broke out between different leadership factions. The party has failed to contest national elections since the 2002 Hungarian parliamentary election and the last SZDP statement came in 2013; the party can thus be considered defunct.

== Ideology ==
Both the Social Democratic Party and the Hungarian Social Democratic Party have claimed to be the natural successors to the Social Democratic Party which existed before 1948 and the imposition of one-party rule in Hungary.

The Historic Social Democrats have argued that they are in the historical tradition of Hungarian social democracy as they have retained their distance from the Hungarian Socialist Party (MSZP) - whilst the MSZDP has formed a close, shared platform with the MSZP. The MSZP are regarded by the SZDP as a post-communist formation and not within the social democratic tradition.

Ideologically, some in the SZDP have been closer to what is described as democratic socialism in the United Kingdom, and have aimed to provide a democratic critique of capitalism. Others, including the current leadership, have stressed the nationalistic aspects to social democracy. Anna Kéthly is regarded as one of the historical leading figures, providing the SZDP with its own philosophy of ethical social democracy. The party is opposed to wholesale privatisation and "extreme" neoliberalism, and is committed to building up the "indigenous" Hungarian economy. The last official statement from the party in February 2013 pledged support for the current Fidesz administration.

== Election results ==
=== National Assembly ===
Election year	National Assembly				Government
Election year	# of overall votes	% of overall vote	# of overall seats won	+/–	Government
1994	1,197	0.02%	0 / 386		extra-parliamentary
1998	669	0.01%	0 / 386	0	extra-parliamentary
2002	912	0.01%	0 / 386	0	extra-parliamentary
2006	118	0.0%	0 / 386	0	extra-parliamentary
2014	1,058	0.02%	0 / 199	0	extra-parliamentary

=== European Parliament ===
Election year	# of overall votes	% of overall vote	# of overall seats won	+/-	Notes
2004	12,196	0.4% (#8)	0 / 24		
