= World Ecological Parties =

International network of Green-aligned ecological parties

The World Ecological Parties (WEP) is an international association of mainly ecological parties. The WEP was founded in November 2003 in Mainz, Germany and elected its first board in April 2004 in Strasbourg, France. The WEP is independent from the Global Greens, a competing political international that also organizes green parties.

The WEP holds General Assembly meetings annually in April or May; the inaugural meeting occurred from 1–3 April 2005 in Lisbon, Portugal, the 2006 meeting was held in Vršac, Serbia on 6 and 7 May, the 2007 meeting was held from 25 to 27 May in Hungary.

== Members ==
List

=== Full members ===
Country	Name
Canada	Cosmopolitan Party of Canada
Democratic Republic of the Congo	Stand Up For The Congo
Denmark	Green Democrats
France	Independent Ecological Movement
Portugal	Earth Party
Germany	Ecological Democratic Party
Greece	Ecologists of Greece
Albania	Albanian Green League Party
Kosovo	Ecological Party of Kosovo
Democratic Republic of the Congo	Save The Congo
Serbia	Zelena Stranka
Hungary	Hungarian Social Green Party

=== Former members ===
Country	Name
Netherlands	Sustainable Netherlands

=== Network Partners ===
Country	Name
Australia	Nuclear Disarmament Party (Network member)
Togo	Asol (Network member)

=== Other affiliated organisations ===
Country	Name
Transnational member	World Ecological Parties Youth

== Leadership ==
Country	Position	Name
Germany	General Secretary	Ellen Eigemeier
Albania	President	Erida Luka
Serbia	Vice President	Budimir Babic
Germany	Treasurer	Ulrike Brandhorst
Hungary	Event Manager	Ottó Stekler
France	Member of the Board	Michael McGee
Serbia	Member of the Board	Goran Dimitrijevski
