= János Vargha =

- Born: 1949 (age 76–77)
- Occupations: environmentalist, biologist, photographer
- Years active: since 1981
- Awards: Goldman Environment Prize (1990); Right Livelihood Award (1985)

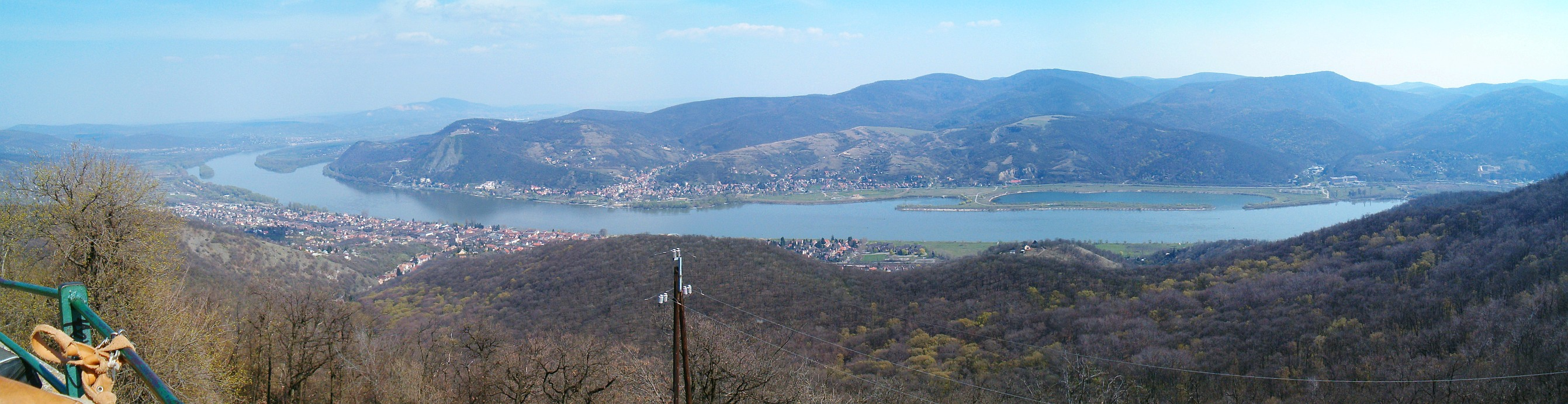
Nagymaros is a town in Pest county, Hungary.

János Vargha (born 1949) is a Hungarian biologist, environmentalist and photographer. He organized opposition in particular against the projected Nagymaros dam in the Danube river system. He founded Duna Kör, an environmental movement.

== Education and career ==
Vargha graduated from the József Attila University, Szeged in 1977 where he took his master's degree in biology. In 1998 he became the chief environmental advisor of the Hungarian government but he left his job in 2000.

== Social and environmental activist ==
Around 1981, Vargha was active to save the Danube River and the habitat of over 200 animal and plant species due to the plans of building a dam which would have submerged 150,000 acres of forests. This would have led to transformating the fauna and flora of the Danube river into an industrial site. In order to prevent authorities from building the dam, he founded the association Duna Kör (Danube Circle) in 1984, which was against the project. Vargha's publications on the Nagymaros dam were censored by Hungarian authorities. Despite this fact, Vargha managed to publish information about the potential consequences and dangers of the construction of the dam to the wildlife and local population. He organised a walk with the members of Duna Kör around the dam site which was suppressed by the police. At that time he was working as an editor in a scientific magazine, a job that he was made redundant of because of his involvement in environmental activities. In order to make the world aware of the plans of building the dam, Duna Kör organized many demonstrations and an international conference (1988) with the help of the World Wildlife Fund. As a result, over 150,000 people supported the petition for a national referendum on the dam.

Since 1981 Vargha publishes articles and presents lectures about environmental issues of water management and water constructions.

== Awards ==
János Vargha has been the Goldman Prize recipient in 1990, and the recipient of the Right Livelihood Award in 1985. The Right Livelihood Award was granted to him owing to his commitment to preserving the wildlife of the Danube River and securing access to drinking water for the local population. The Right Livelihood Award Foundation granted the award to Vargha “...for working under unusually difficult circumstances to preserve the river Danube, a vital part of Hungary's environment."
