= Green Left (Hungary) =

Green Left Zöld Baloldal
- President: Attila Trasciatti
- Founded: 28 February 2009
- Dissolved: 11 October 2018
- Merger of: ZDSZ, EFKEME and Workers' Party '06
- Newspaper: A Mi Időnk
- Ideology: Eco-socialism; Environmentalism; Feminism
- Political position: Left-wing
- European affiliation: European Green Party (until Sep 2015)
- International affiliation: Global Greens (until Sep 2015)
- National Assembly: 0 / 199
- European Parliament: 0 / 21

The Green Left (Hungarian: Zöld Baloldal, pronounced [ˈzøld ˈbɒloldɒl]; ZB), was a green eco-socialist political party in Hungary, founded in 2009.

== History ==
It was established by the merger of the Alliance of Green Democrats (ZDSZ), the European Feminist Initiative for a Different Europe (EFKEME) and the Workers' Party of Hungary 2006. It has a green socialist, radical left, anti-capitalist and alter-globalist ideology. In March 2009, the Hungarian Anti-Fascist League and the Social Charta 2008 joined the alliance. The first leader of the party was György Droppa. On 30 May 2010, Marxist philosopher Gáspár Miklós Tamás was elected new president of the party.

The ZB received only 0.03 percent of the individual votes in the 2010 parliamentary election, while its green party rival the Politics Can Be Different (LMP) jumped over the electoral threshold. After that ZB marginalized, its member parties started to operate independently again. During the 2014 local elections, some members run as candidate under 4K! – Fourth Republic! banner. On 7 September 2015, ZB withdrew its European Green Party membership because of financial reasons.

== Election results ==
=== National Assembly ===
Election year	National Assembly				Government
Election year	# of overall votes	% of overall vote	# of overall seats won	+/–	Government
2010	1,425	0.03 %	0 / 386		Extra-parliamentary

== Sources ==
- Vida, István (2011). "Zöld Baloldal (ZB)". Magyarországi politikai pártok lexikona (1846–2010) [Encyclopedia of the Political Parties in Hungary (1846–2010)] (in Hungarian). Gondolat Kiadó. p. 468. ISBN 978-963-693-276-3.
