= Sap, Slovakia =

Sap Szap
- Municipality
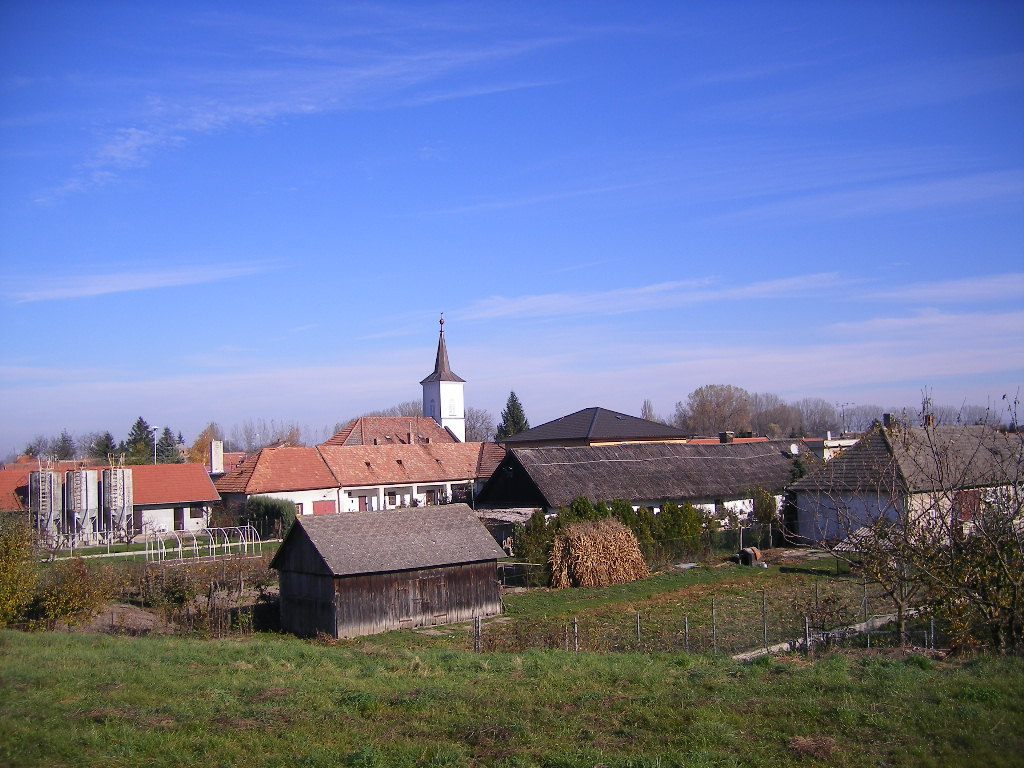

- Flag Coat of arms

- Location of Sap in the Trnava Region Location of Sap in Slovakia
- Coordinates: 47°49′13″N 17°47′08″E
- Country: Slovakia
- Region: Trnava Region
- District: Dunajská Streda District
- First mentioned: 1289

Area
  - Total: 12.54 km^{2} (4.84 sq mi)
- Elevation: 113 m (371 ft)

Population (2025)
  - Total: 503

Ethnicity
- Time zone: UTC+1 (CET)
  - Summer (DST): UTC+2 (CEST)
- Postal code: 930 06
- Area code: +421 31
- Vehicle registration plate (until 2022): DS
- Website: obecsap.eu

Sap (Hungarian: Szap, pronounced [ˈsɒp]) is a village and municipality in the Dunajská Streda District in the Trnava Region of south-west Slovakia. The outlet channel of the Gabčíkovo – Nagymaros Dams re-enters the Danube at the village.

== Geography ==
The municipality lies at an altitude of 113 metres (371 ft) and covers an area of 12.54 km^{2} (4.84 sq mi) (2025).

== History ==
The village was first recorded in 1255 as Zap. Until the end of World War I, it was part of Hungary and fell within the Tószigetcsilizköz district of Győr County. After the Austro-Hungarian army disintegrated in November 1918, Czechoslovak troops occupied the area. After the Treaty of Trianon of 1920, the village became officially part of Czechoslovakia. In November 1938, the First Vienna Award granted the area to Hungary and it was held by Hungary until 1945. After Soviet occupation in 1945, Czechoslovak administration returned and the village became officially part of Czechoslovakia in 1947. In 1948, Czechoslovak authorities renamed the village for Palkovičovo and its historical name was restored only in 1990.

== Population ==
Population statistic (10 years)
Year	1995	2005	2015	2025
Count	565	538	522	503
Difference		−4.77%	−2.97%	−3.63%

Population statistic
Year	2024	2025
Count	503	503
Difference		+0%

It has a population of 503 people (31 December 2025).

=== Ethnicity ===
Census 2021 (1+ %)
Ethnicity	Number	Fraction
Hungarian	436	85.82%
Slovak	65	12.79%
Not found out	22	4.33%
Czech	6	1.18%
Total	508	

In year 2021 was 508 people by ethnicity 436 as Hungarian, 65 as Slovak, 22 as Not found out, 6 as Czech, 2 as Serbian, 1 as German and 1 as French.

Note on population: The difference values of population numbers in the table "Population statistic" and in the sections "Ethnicity" & "Religion" is caused by the use of various statistical methods.

=== Religion ===
Census 2021 (1+ %)
Religion	Number	Fraction
Roman Catholic Church	252	49.61%
Calvinist Church	148	29.13%
None	75	14.76%
Not found out	13	2.56%
Evangelical Church	9	1.77%
Greek Catholic Church	6	1.18%
Total	508	

In year 2021 was 508 people by religion 252 from Roman Catholic Church, 148 from Calvinist Church, 75 from None, 13 from Not found out, 9 from Evangelical Church, 6 from Greek Catholic Church, 2 from Eastern Orthodox Church, 1 from Christian Congregations in Slovakia, 1 from Islam and 1 from Ad hoc movements.

In 1910, the village had 645, for the most part, Hungarian inhabitants. At the 2001 Census the recorded population of the village was 540 while an end-2008 estimate by the Statistical Office had the villages's population as 550. As of 2001, 96,30 per cent of its population was Hungarian while 2,41 per cent was Slovak.

As of 2001, 58,52% of the inhabitants professed Roman Catholicism.
