= 2006 Hungarian parliamentary election =

- 9 April 2006 (first round); 23 April 2006 (second round)

All 386 seats to the National Assembly 194 seats were needed for a majority
- Turnout: 67.83% (first round); 64.39% (second round)
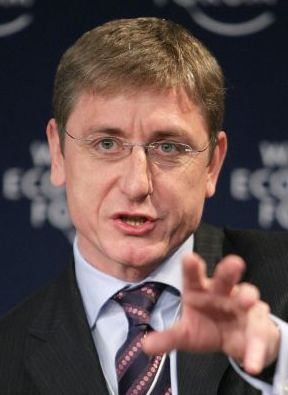

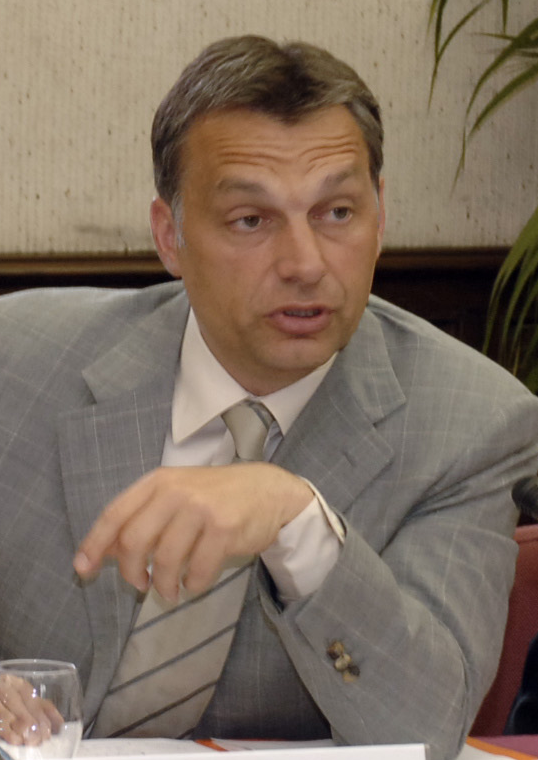

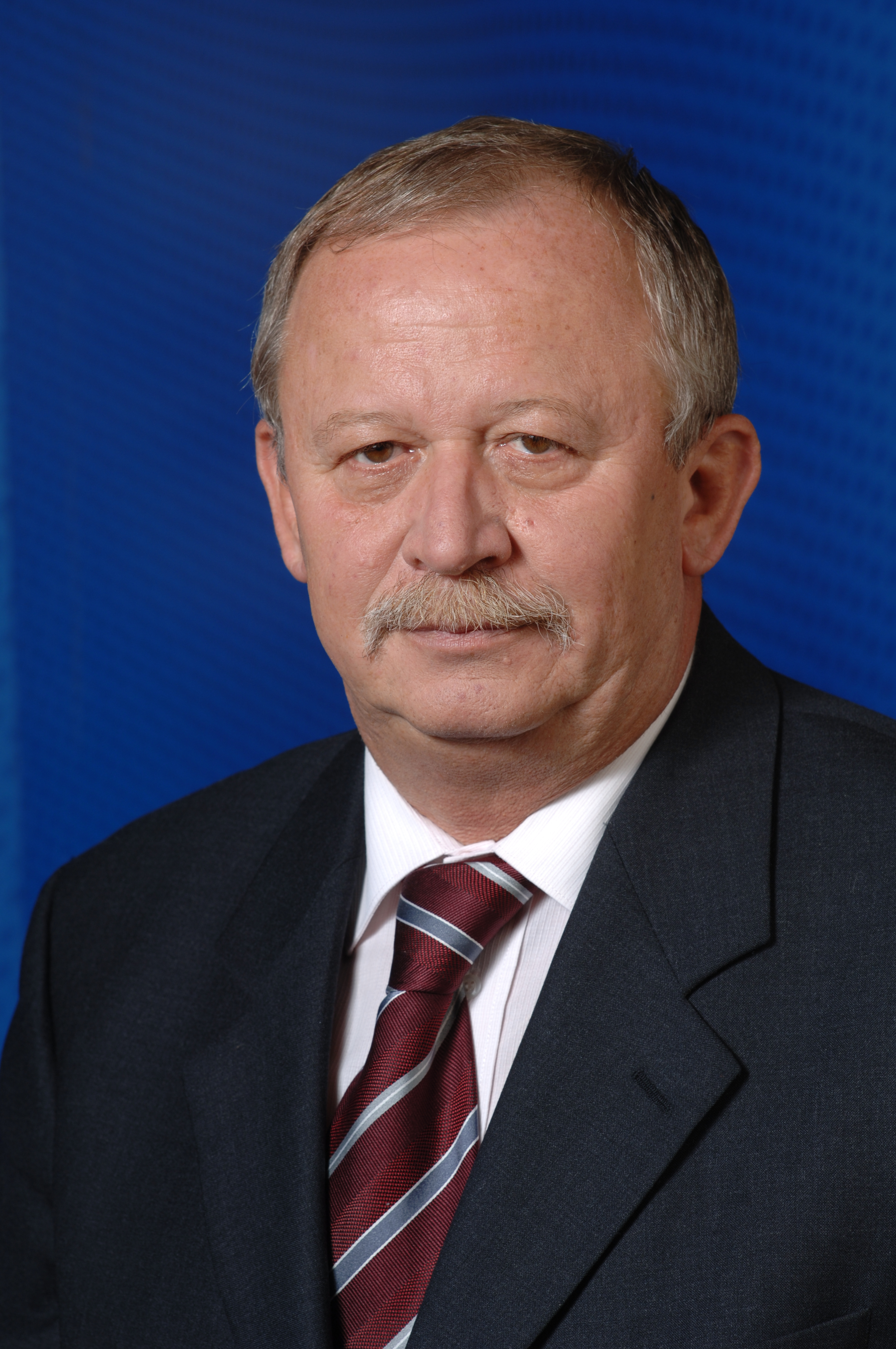

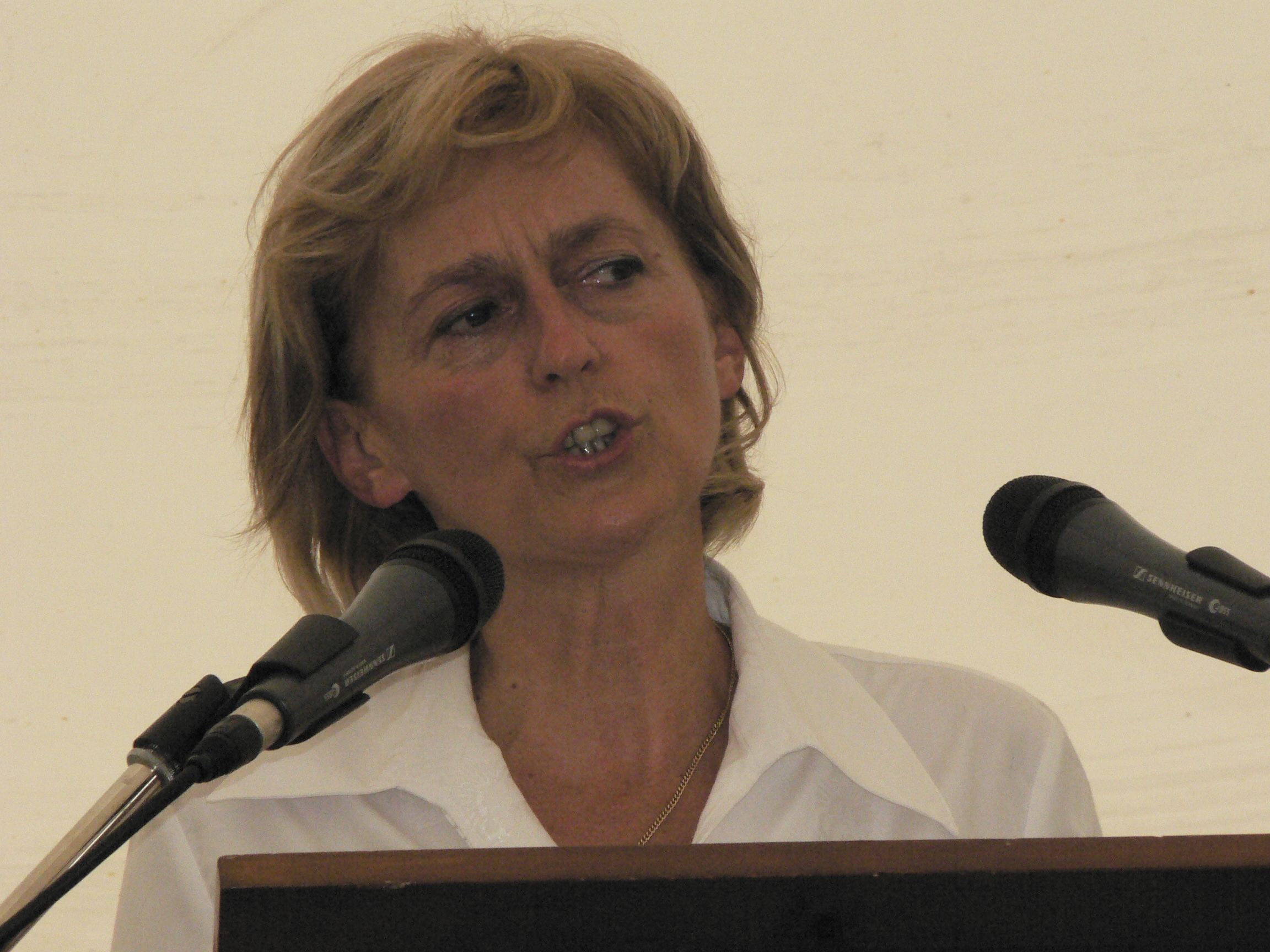
	First party	Second party
Leader	Ferenc Gyurcsány	Viktor Orbán
Party	MSZP	Fidesz
Alliance		Fidesz–KDNP
Leader since	29 September 2004 (Note: Gyurcsány became Prime Minister on 29 September 2004, but was not leader of the MSZP until 2007.)	17 May 2003 (Note: As Fidesz leader.)
Last election	178 seats, 42.05%	164 seats, 41.07% (Note: As part of Fidesz–MDF alliance.)
Seats won	190	164
Seat change	▲12 (Note: Including four deputies elected as joint MSZP–SZDSZ candidates.)	Steady
1R vote and %	2,175,312 (40.3%)	2,269,241 (42%)
2R vote and %	1,510,360 (46.6%)	1,511,426 (46.7%)
Party vote	2,336,705	2,272,979
% and swing	43.21% ▲1.16 pp	42.03% ▲0.96 pp (Note: Contested the previous election as part of the Fidesz–MDF alliance.)
	Third party	Fourth party
Leader	Gábor Kuncze	Ibolya Dávid
Party	SZDSZ	MDF
Leader since	1 July 2001	30 January 1999
Last election	20 seats, 5.57%	24 seats, 41.07%
Seats won	20	11
Seat change	(Note: Including two deputies elected as joint SZDSZ–MSZP candidates.)	▼13
1R vote and %	340,746 (6.3%)	238,566 (4.4%)
2R vote and %	64,501 (2%)	16,364 (0.5%)
Party vote	351,612	272,831
% and swing	6.5% ▲0.93 pp	5.04% ▼36.03 pp
- Results of the election. A darker shade indicates a higher vote share. Proportional list results are displayed in the top left.
Government before election
First Gyurcsány Government
MSZP–SZDSZ
Government after election
Second Gyurcsány Government
MSZP–SZDSZ

Parliamentary elections were held in Hungary on 9 April 2006, with a second round of voting in 110 of the 176 single-member constituencies on 23 April. The Hungarian Socialist Party emerged as the largest party in the National Assembly with 186 of the 386 seats, and continued the coalition government with the Alliance of Free Democrats.

It marked the first time a government had been re-elected since the end of Communist rule. This was the last national election in Hungary until 2026 not won by Fidesz–KDNP, and the last to date in which the victorious party did not win a two-thirds supermajority in parliament.

== Electoral system ==
The unicameral National Assembly (Országgyűlés), the highest organ of state authority, initiates and approves legislation sponsored by the prime minister. A party had to win at least 5% of the national vote (based on the total of regional list votes) to form a parliamentary faction. The National Assembly had 386 members, elected for a four-year term in a mixed system: 176 members in single-seat constituencies by a modified two-round system, 152 in multi-seat constituencies by party-list proportional representation (using territorial lists) and 58 members (using a national list) to realize semi-proportional representation.

The election took over two days. On 9 April elections took place in every constituency, both single-seat and multi-seat. In order to get elected into a single-seat constituency, a candidate needs to receive more than 50% of the vote; in the 2006 elections, the victor received more than 50% of the vote in 66 of the 176 single-seat constituencies. There was another election in the remaining 110 single-seat constituencies in the 2nd round, in which all but the top three candidates (and every candidate reaching 15%) from the 1st round are excluded. Usually parties formed alliances between the two rounds and withdraw many of their 3rd place candidates and call for supporting the allied party so the winning candidate of the 2nd round will receive more than 50% of the vote. However, this process was not automatic, but grounded by negotiations.

The multi-seat elections also took place during the first round of voting. 146 of the 152 seats were filled using closed-list proportional representation. The remaining 6 were added to the national list calculation. The country was divided into 20 regions for the multi-seat elections with varying numbers of members per region. Where a party won more members in a region than it merited, the surplus votes were deducted from the total it received in the second round. Correspondingly, a party that received fewer seats than it merited had the shortfall votes added to its total in the second round.

A further 58 (plus 6 more not elected from the multi-seat constituencies in the first round) extra members were elected using a national list, which voter could not vote for directly, but indirectly through constituency and regional votes, in order to achieve a more proportional result.

=== Nomination ===
Before the election the parties needed to be registered by the National Electoral Office. After registration the parties had the right to collect references. Each candidate had to collect 750 references in their district. If one party collected the required number in two districts (in Budapest 8, Pest 5 and Borsod-Abaúj-Zemplén 3) in a county, then it could present a list in regional constituencies. If a party had at least seven regional lists, it could present a national compensation list. 17 March was the last day when a party could be registered and a list or a candidate could be registered. By 28 February, 49 parties had sought registration, and 45 were registered by the National Electoral Office.

== Campaign ==
On 10 April the two parties of the governing coalition Hungarian Socialist Party and Alliance of Free Democrats (MSZP–SZDSZ) announced their alliance for the second round. The Socialist Party withdrew three of their candidates in favour of the Alliance one, and the Alliance withdrew their remaining 55 candidates (all of which had finished third), and called on its voters to support the Socialists. The leaders of the two parties ran a common campaign between the two rounds.

The opposition was not united. The Hungarian Democratic Forum (MDF) which hit the 5% threshold contrary to the polls and expectations made it clear that they would not support Viktor Orbán's Fidesz party. Orbán tried to get their support by declaring that he resigned from Prime Minister candidacy, and sought a compromise candidate, Péter Ákos Bod, but the MDF held on to their independency; thus they did not withdraw their 3rd place candidates. However, some MDF candidates did not agree with this, and withdrew in favour of Fidesz.

== Opinion polling ==
Party	January	+/-	February	+/-	March
Fidesz–KDNP	48%	-6.3%	41.7%	+2.5%	44.2%
Hungarian Socialist Party	42%	+0.1%	42.1%	+2.6%	44.7%
Alliance of Free Democrats	3%	+2.8%	5.8%	-1.2%	4.6%
Hungarian Democratic Forum	3%	+1.4%	4.4%	-0.7%	3.7%
Centre Party	2%	+0.8%	2.8%	-2.2%	0.6%
Hungarian Communist Workers' Party	1%	-0.2%	0.8%	-0.4%	0.4%
MIÉP–Jobbik Third Way Alliance of Parties	1%	+0.6%	1.6%	-0.2%	1.4%
Others	0%	+0.8%	0.8%	-0.4%	0.4%
Source: Gallup

== Results ==
Party	Proportional			SMCs (first round)			SMCs (second round)			Seats		
Party	Votes	%	Seats	Votes	%	Seats	Votes	%	Seats	National	Total	+/–
Hungarian Socialist Party	2,336,705	43.21	71	2,175,312	40.26	34	1,510,360	46.62	64	17	186	+8
Fidesz–KDNP	2,272,979	42.03	69	2,269,241	41.99	28	1,511,426	46.65	40	27	164	–15
Alliance of Free Democrats	351,612	6.50	4	340,746	6.31	0	64,501	1.99	3	11	18	–1
Hungarian Democratic Forum	272,831	5.04	2	238,566	4.41	0	16,364	0.51	0	9	11	+2
MIÉP–Jobbik Third Way Alliance of Parties	119,007	2.20	0	92,798	1.72	0	231	0.01	0	0	0	0
Hungarian Workers' Party	21,955	0.41	0	16,379	0.30	0				0	0	0
Centre Party	17,431	0.32	0	14,126	0.26	0				0	0	0
Forum of Gypsy Organisations–Party of Roma Solidarity	4,459	0.08	0	7,165	0.13	0				0	0	New
Party of Greens	2,870	0.05	0	4,678	0.09	0				0	0	New
Hungarian Countryside and Civic Party	2,789	0.05	0	2,716	0.05	0				0	0	New
Christian Democratic Party – Solidarity of Christian Social Centre	2,362	0.04	0	2,906	0.05	0				0	0	New
Party of Independent Smallholders and National Unity	889	0.02	0	742	0.01	0				0	0	New
Independent Smallholders Party	838	0.02	0	2,030	0.04	0				0	0	0
Alliance of Hungarians for One Another	767	0.01	0	904	0.02	0				0	0	New
Workers' Party of Hungary 2006	556	0.01	0	1,489	0.03	0				0	0	New
Hungarian Socialist Party–Alliance of Free Democrats				154,619	2.86	4	72,802	2.25	2	0	6	+5
Fidesz–KDNP–MDF				34,109	0.63	0	33,029	1.02	0	0	0	–
MDF–Solidarity for Szabolcs County				13,672	0.25	0	3,640	0.11	0	0	0	–
Association for Somogy				9,457	0.18	0	13,801	0.43	1	0	1	New
Human Chain for Hungary				2,002	0.04	0				0	0	New
Hungarian Pensioners Party–MDF				1,166	0.02	0				0	0	–
Hungarian Pensioners Party				505	0.01	0				0	0	0
Social Democratic Party				118	0.00	0				0	0	0
Alliance of Green Democrats				95	0.00	0				0	0	New
Létalap				80	0.00	0				0	0	New
Independents				18,054	0.33	0	13,598	0.42	0	–	0	0
Total	5,408,050	100.00	146	5,403,675	100.00	66	3,239,752	100.00	110	64	386	0
Valid votes	5,408,050	99.13		5,403,675	99.06		3,239,752	99.48				
Invalid/blank votes	47,302	0.87		51,402	0.94		16,992	0.52				
Total votes	5,455,352	100.00		5,455,077	100.00		3,256,744	100.00				
Registered voters/turnout	8,046,129	67.80		8,046,129	67.80		5,059,002	64.38				
Source: Valasztas, Election Resources

=== Party list results by county ===
County	MSZP	Fidesz-KDNP	SZDSZ	MDF	MIÉP-Jobbik	Munkáspárt	Centrum	Others
Bács-Kiskun	37.09	49.79	4.93	5.12	1.88	–	0.67	0.51
Baranya	48.32	38.31	5.70	5.10	1.28	0.41	–	0.88
Békés	43.73	42.96	4.47	4.85	1.63	1.07	0.86	0.43
Borsod-Abaúj-Zemplén	50.94	38.18	3.87	3.83	2.30	–	0.67	0.21
Budapest	43.78	35.11	12.28	5.30	2.90	0.62	–	–
Csongrád	44.16	41.83	5.29	4.87	1.62	0.79	0.80	0.63
Fejér	43.18	42.74	5.92	5.48	1.89	0.65	–	0.13
Győr-Moson-Sopron	37.62	49.00	4.92	5.62	1.92	0.54	–	0.37
Hajdú-Bihar	39.72	47.70	3.95	5.38	2.04	–	0.59	0.62
Heves	49.19	37.16	5.13	4.44	3.00	–	–	1.09
Jász-Nagykun-Szolnok	47.00	39.74	4.83	4.95	2.07	1.31	–	0.11
Komárom-Esztergom	49.09	37.98	6.26	4.45	1.50	0.72	–	–
Nógrád	44.41	41.06	4.29	4.70	2.16	1.58	0.66	1.13
Pest	41.34	42.06	7.43	5.21	2.95	–	1.03	–
Somogy	42.74	46.74	4.04	4.17	1.64	0.68	–	–
Szabolcs-Szatmár-Bereg	45.47	44.45	3.29	4.16	1.65	–	0.35	0.62
Tolna	40.51	46.62	4.59	5.96	1.83	–	–	0.48
Vas	35.65	50.84	5.70	5.78	1.82	–	–	0.21
Veszprém	39.84	46.71	5.59	5.54	1.71	0.60	–	–
Zala	37.26	49.67	5.08	5.82	2.05	–	–	0.12
Total	43.21	42.03	6.50	5.04	2.20	0.41	0.32	0.29

== See also ==
- 2006 protests in Hungary
- 2006 Hungarian local elections
