= Hungarian Socialist Workers' Party (1993) =

Hungarian Socialist Workers' Party Magyar Szocialista Munkáspárt
- Abbreviation: MSZMP
- Founded: 1993
- Split from: Hungarian Workers' Party
- Membership (2010): 130
- Ideology: Communism; Marxism–Leninism
- Political position: Far-left

The Hungarian Socialist Workers' Party (Hungarian: Magyar Szocialista Munkáspárt, MSZMP) is a small Marxist–Leninist communist party in Hungary, formed after a split in the Workers' Party in 1993 with the leadership of László Fazekas, Elemér Csaba and Tamás Hirschler. As of August 2010, the party had cadres in ten cities across Hungary and 130 members.
