= 1998 Hungarian parliamentary election =

- 10 May 1998 (first round); 24 May 1998 (second round)

All 386 seats to the National Assembly 194 seats needed for a majority
- Turnout: 56.21% (first round); 57.01% (second round)
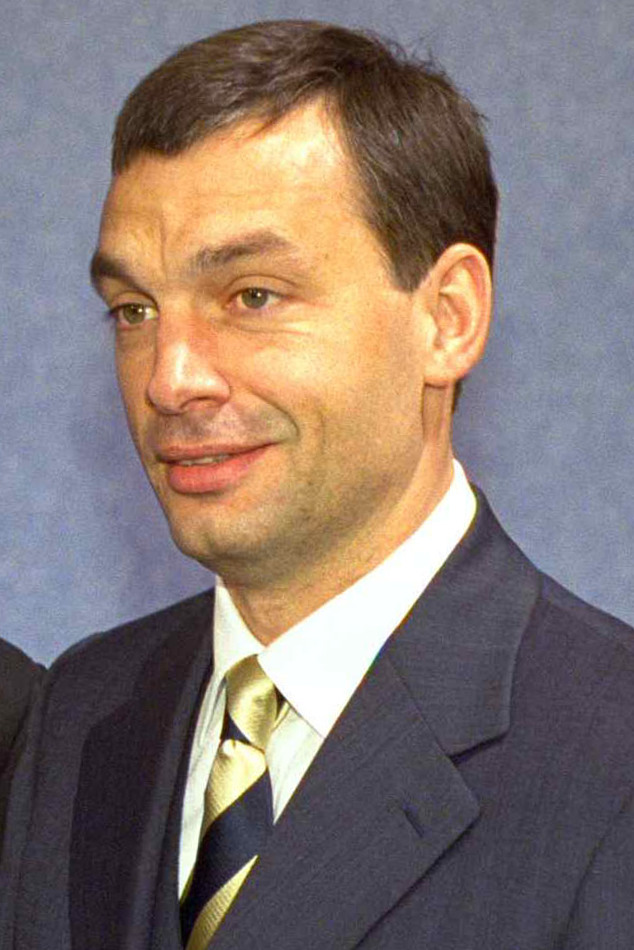

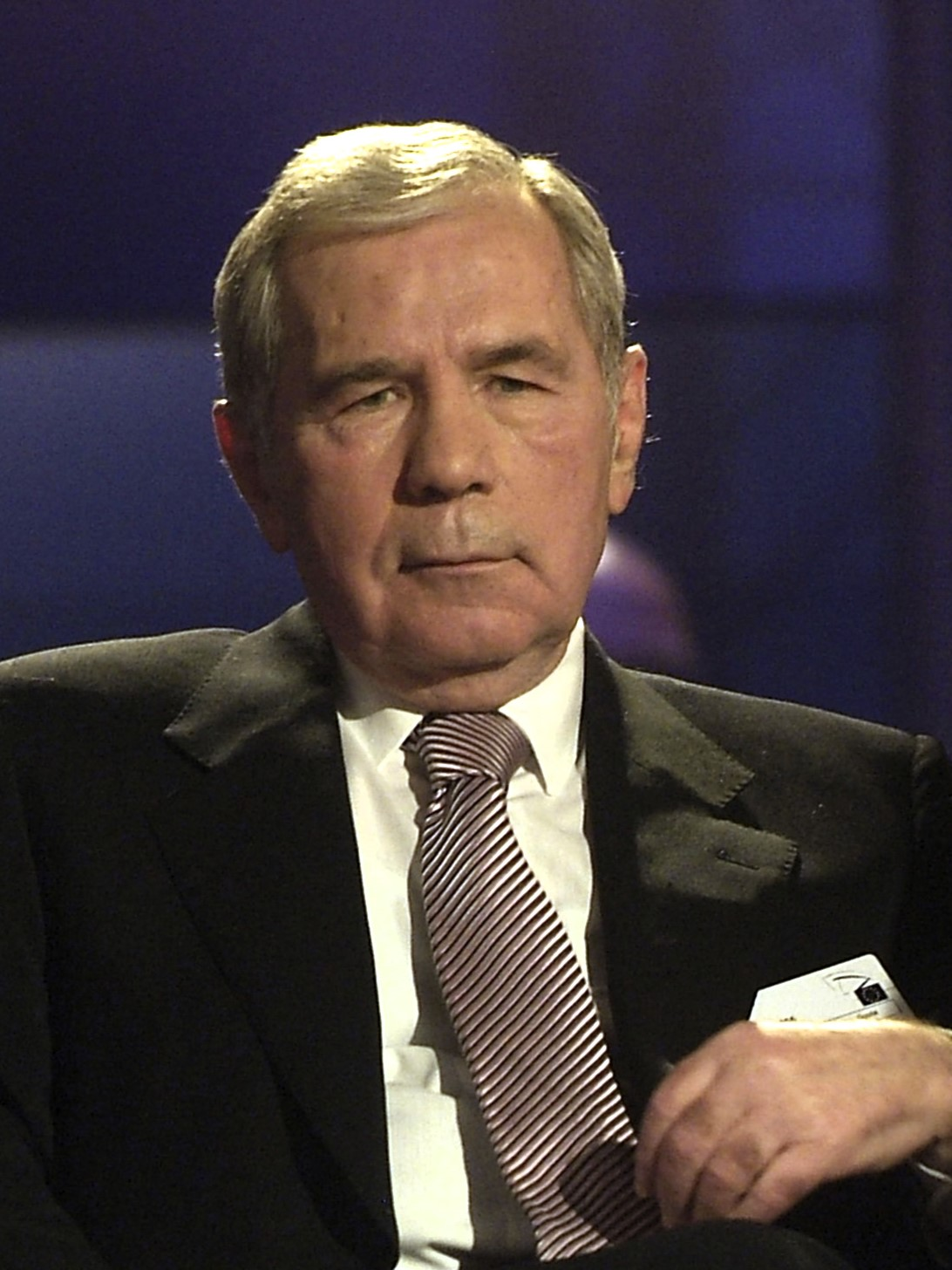

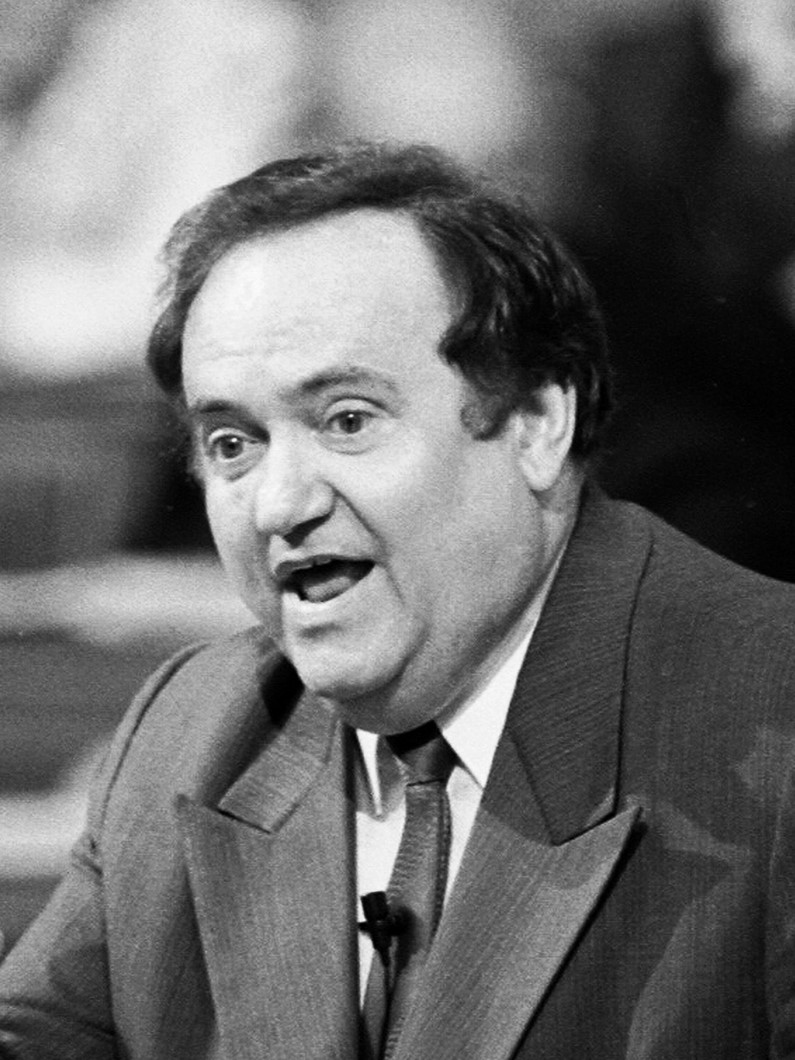

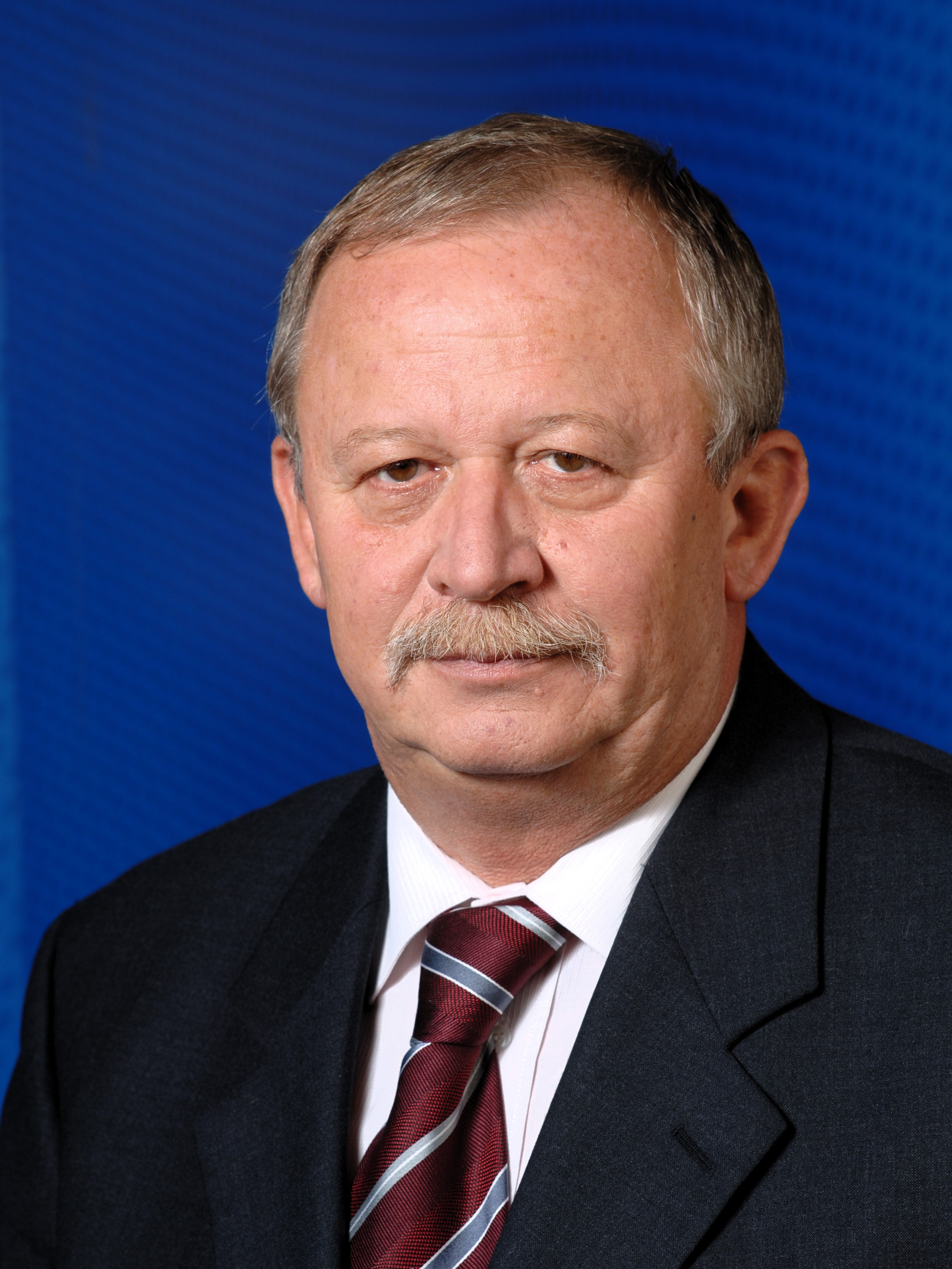

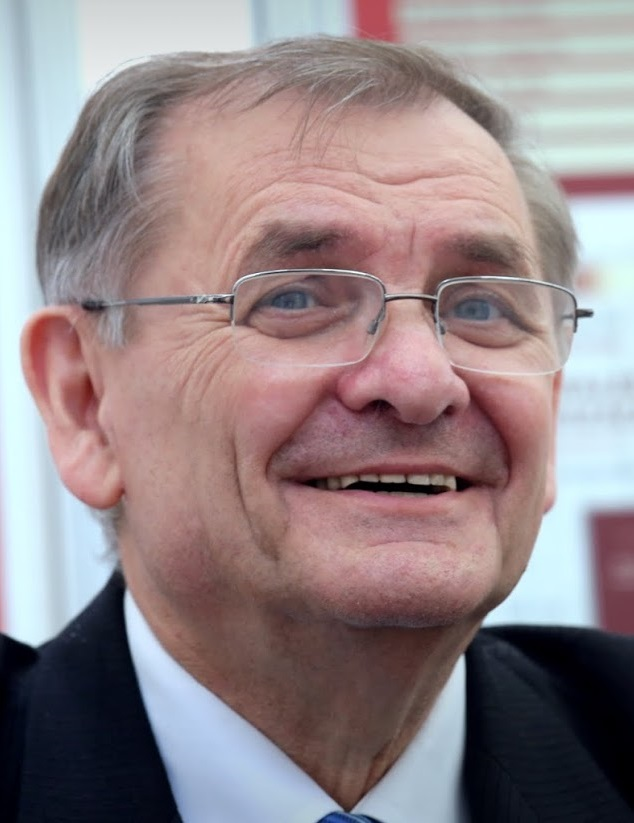

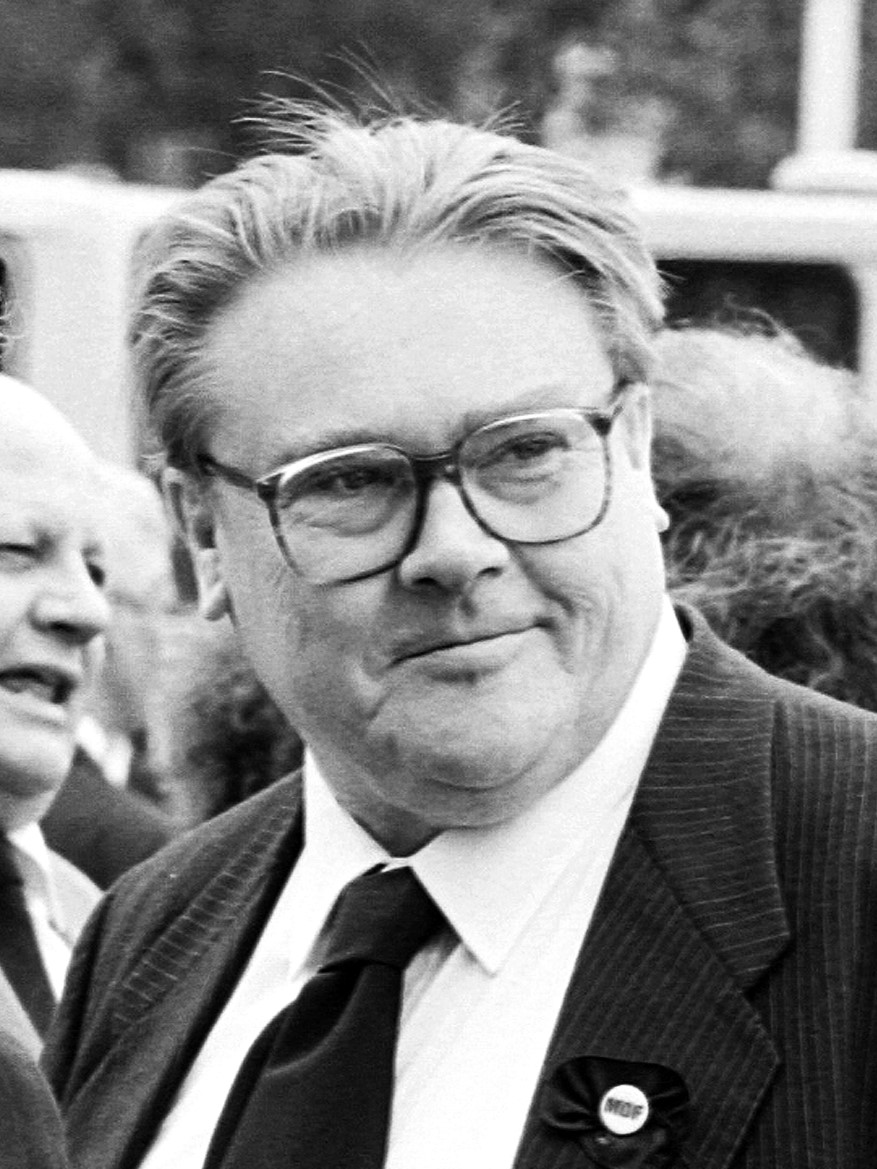
	First party	Second party	Third party
Leader	Viktor Orbán	Gyula Horn	József Torgyán
Party	Fidesz	MSZP	FKGP
Leader since	18 April 1993	27 May 1990	1991
Last election	20 seats, 7.02%	209 seats, 32.99%	26 seats, 8.82%
Seats won	148	134	48
Seat change	▲128 (Note: Including 35 deputies elected as joint Fidesz–MDF candidates.)	▼75	▲22
1R vote and %	956,008 (21.4%)	1,332,178 (29.8%)	594,023 (13.3%)
2R vote and %	1,706,155 (37.8%)	1,941,307 (43.0%)	275,857 (6.1%)
Party vote	1,340,826	1,497,231	597,820
% and swing	29.48% ▲22.46 pp	32.92% ▼0.07 pp	13.15% ▲4.33 pp
	Fourth party	Fifth party	Sixth party
Leader	Gábor Kuncze	Sándor Lezsák	István Csurka
Party	SZDSZ	MDF	MIÉP
Leader since	24 April 1997	2 March 1996	15 July 1993
Last election	70 seats, 19.74%	38 seats, 11.74%	0 seats, 1.59%
Seats won	24	17	14
Seat change	▼46	▼21 (Note: Including 15 deputies elected as joint MDF–Fidesz candidates.)	▲14
1R vote and %	456,008 (10.2%)	343,089 (7.7%)	249,127 (5.6%)
2R vote and %	139,504 (3.1%)	356,891 (7.9%)	28,608 (0.6%)
Party vote	344,352	127,118	248,901
% and swing	7.57% ▼12.17 pp	2.80% ▼8.94 pp	5.47% ▲3.88 pp
- Results of the election. Proportional list results are displayed in the top left.
Government before election
Horn Government
MSZP–SZDSZ
Government after election
First Orbán Government
Fidesz–FKGP–MDF

Parliamentary elections were held in Hungary on 10 May 1998, with a second round of voting in 175 of the 176 single member constituencies on 24 May.

Although the Hungarian Socialist Party received the most votes, the then-liberal conservative Fidesz won the most seats. The successful breakthrough into parliament by the extreme right-wing Hungarian Justice and Life Party was also a major shock. After the election, Fidesz formed a centre-right coalition government with the Independent Smallholders Party and Hungarian Democratic Forum.

This was the last election since 1990 that all of the mandate gained parties ran separately and not as alliance in electoral lists.

== Electoral system ==
The unicameral National Assembly (Országgyűlés), the highest organ of state authority, initiates and approves legislation sponsored by the prime minister. A party had to win at least 5% of the national vote (based on the total of regional list votes) to form a parliamentary faction. The National Assembly had 386 members, elected for a four-year term in a mixed system: 176 members in single-seat constituencies by a modified two-round system, 152 in multi-seat constituencies by party-list proportional representation (using territorial lists) and 58 members (using a national list) to realize semi-proportional representation.

== Results ==
Party	Proportional			SMCs (first round)			SMCs (second round)			Seats		
Party	Votes	%	Seats	Votes	%	Seats	Votes	%	Seats	National	Total	+/–
Hungarian Socialist Party	1,497,231	32.92	50	1,332,178	29.82	0	1,941,307	43.04	54	30	134	–75
Fidesz	1,340,826	29.48	48	956,008	21.40	1	1,706,155	37.83	89	10	148	+128
Independent Smallholders' Party	597,820	13.15	22	594,023	13.30	0	275,857	6.12	12	14	48	+22
Alliance of Free Democrats	344,352	7.57	5	456,008	10.21	0	139,504	3.09	2	17	24	–45
Hungarian Justice and Life Party	248,901	5.47	3	249,127	5.58	0	28,608	0.63	0	11	14	+14
Hungarian Workers' Party	179,672	3.95	0	165,455	3.70	0	17,703	0.39	0	0	0	0
Hungarian Democratic Forum	127,118	2.80	0	343,089	7.68	0	356,891	7.91	17	0	17	–21
Christian Democratic People's Party	104,892	2.31	0	129,787	2.90	0	122	0.00	0	0	0	–22
Hungarian Democratic People's Party	61,004	1.34	0	87,971	1.97	0	247	0.01	0	0	0	New
New Alliance for Hungary	22,220	0.49	0	23,891	0.53	0	1,502	0.03	0	0	0	New
Union for Hungary	8,786	0.19	0	13,599	0.30	0	347	0.01	0	0	0	New
Forum of National Minorities	5,895	0.13	0	11,928	0.27	0	473	0.01	0	0	0	New
Social Democratic Party of Hungary	3,504	0.08	0	11,845	0.27	0	213	0.00	0	0	0	0
Hungarian Social Green Party	3,052	0.07	0	328	0.01	0	206	0.00	0	0	0	0
Entrepreneurs' Party	2,409	0.05	0	8,874	0.20	0	1,054	0.02	0	0	0	–
Alliance of Independent Civilians				1,789	0.04	0				0	0	New
Green Party of Hungary				1,758	0.04	0	130	0.00	0	0	0	New
Association of Independents				972	0.02	0				0	0	New
Social Coalition for Humanitarian Politics				825	0.02	0				0	0	New
Social Democratic Party				669	0.01	0				0	0	0
Hungarian Socialist Workers' Party				515	0.01	0				0	0	0
Women's Party				460	0.01	0				0	0	New
Hungarian Gypsies' Democratic Party				290	0.01	0	264	0.01	0	0	0	New
Hungarian Welfare Alliance				252	0.01	0	76	0.00	0	0	0	New
Hungarian People's Party				184	0.00	0				0	0	New
Party of Earth Dwellers, Life, Justice, Peace, Freedom				150	0.00	0	169	0.00	0	0	0	New
Independents				75,965	1.70	0	39,154	0.87	1	0	1	+1
Total	4,547,682	100.00	128	4,467,940	100.00	1	4,509,982	100.00	175	82	386	0
Valid votes	4,547,682	98.97		4,467,940	98.59		4,509,982	98.74				
Invalid/blank votes	47,529	1.03		64,103	1.41		57,404	1.26				
Total votes	4,595,211	100.00		4,532,043	100.00		4,567,386	100.00				
Registered voters/turnout				8,062,708	56.21		8,016,397	56.98				
Source: Valasztas, Election Resources

=== Party list results by county ===
County	MSZP	Fidesz	FKGP	SZDSZ	MIÉP	MKM	MDF	KDNP	MDNP	Others
Bács-Kiskun	27.51	28.99	20.06	6.17	4.58	3.26	4.37	2.42	0.81	1.83
Baranya	33.84	27.79	13.21	7.96	4.22	4.47	2.91	2.35	1.05	2.21
Békés	29.97	25.24	20.40	6.38	4.01	5.90	2.75	1.85	0.76	2.74
Borsod-Abaúj-Zemplén	35.88	26.24	13.26	5.56	4.70	5.65	2.31	3.69	1.26	1.45
Budapest	33.13	26.54	8.57	11.03	8.84	3.86	3.67	1.79	2.55	-
Csongrád	28.57	31.35	15.72	7.14	4.58	4.13	3.43	2.01	1.04	2.03
Fejér	35.12	30.09	12.74	7.01	4.22	3.61	2.69	1.95	1.11	1.46
Győr-Moson-Sopron	30.87	34.29	11.97	6.98	4.59	2.55	3.00	2.85	1.49	1.42
Hajdú-Bihar (first round, invalid) (Note: In the Hungarian parliamentary election system in force between 1990 and 2010, if the number of valid votes cast in the 1st round in a county did not reach 50% of all voters, then the list voting had to be repeated in the 2nd round in that county. The only example of this was in the 1998 parliamentary election, when in the first round in Hajdú-Bihar County and Szabolcs-Szatmár-Bereg County, the proportion of valid votes in the proportion of all voters did not reach 50%.)	34.15	28.01	14.99	5.89	6.74	3.54	2.71	2.56	-	1.40
Hajdú-Bihar (second round, valid)	39.35	40.09	9.08	2.91	5.69	2.25	-	0.62	-	-
Heves	34.96	23.76	12.50	8.08	6.07	6.44	2.77	3.55	1.30	0.58
Jász-Nagykun-Szolnok	34.78	24.77	16.35	7.27	3.63	6.51	2.05	1.98	0.70	1.97
Komárom-Esztergom	38.83	24.94	12.61	9.12	4.07	4.28	2.49	1.67	1.12	0.86
Nógrád	32.17	27.21	10.80	5.53	2.92	10.42	2.57	4.88	1.02	2.47
Pest	29.13	27.67	15.26	8.89	7.82	3.09	3.66	3.19	1.29	-
Somogy	35.41	29.92	16.44	5.07	4.01	3.30	2.10	2.09	1.21	0.44
Szabolcs-Szatmár-Bereg (first round, invalid)	33.19	24.61	19.53	5.36	2.70	3.25	3.39	3.45	0.73	3.80
Szabolcs-Szatmár-Bereg (second round, valid)	40.32	37.55	12.67	3.19	2.51	2.24	-	-	-	1.51
Tolna	33.03	29.61	13.72	6.68	3.01	3.07	3.55	4.29	0.90	2.13
Vas	27.57	35.51	14.29	9.16	2.62	2.35	2.94	3.51	1.35	0.89
Veszprém	28.69	35.03	13.43	7.48	4.14	3.03	3.13	2.29	1.61	1.18
Zala	27.27	32.24	17.65	7.50	3.70	3.15	2.53	2.69	2.00	1.27
Total (first round, including invalid)	32.25	28.18	13.78	7.88	5.55	4.08	3.12	2.59	1.40	1.19
Total after the second round	32.92	29.48	13.15	7.57	5.47	3.95	2.80	2.31	1.34	1.01
