= 2002 Hungarian parliamentary election =

- 7 April 2002 (first round); 21 April 2002 (second round)

All 386 seats to the National Assembly 194 seats were needed for a majority
- Turnout: 70.53% (first round); 73.51% (second round)
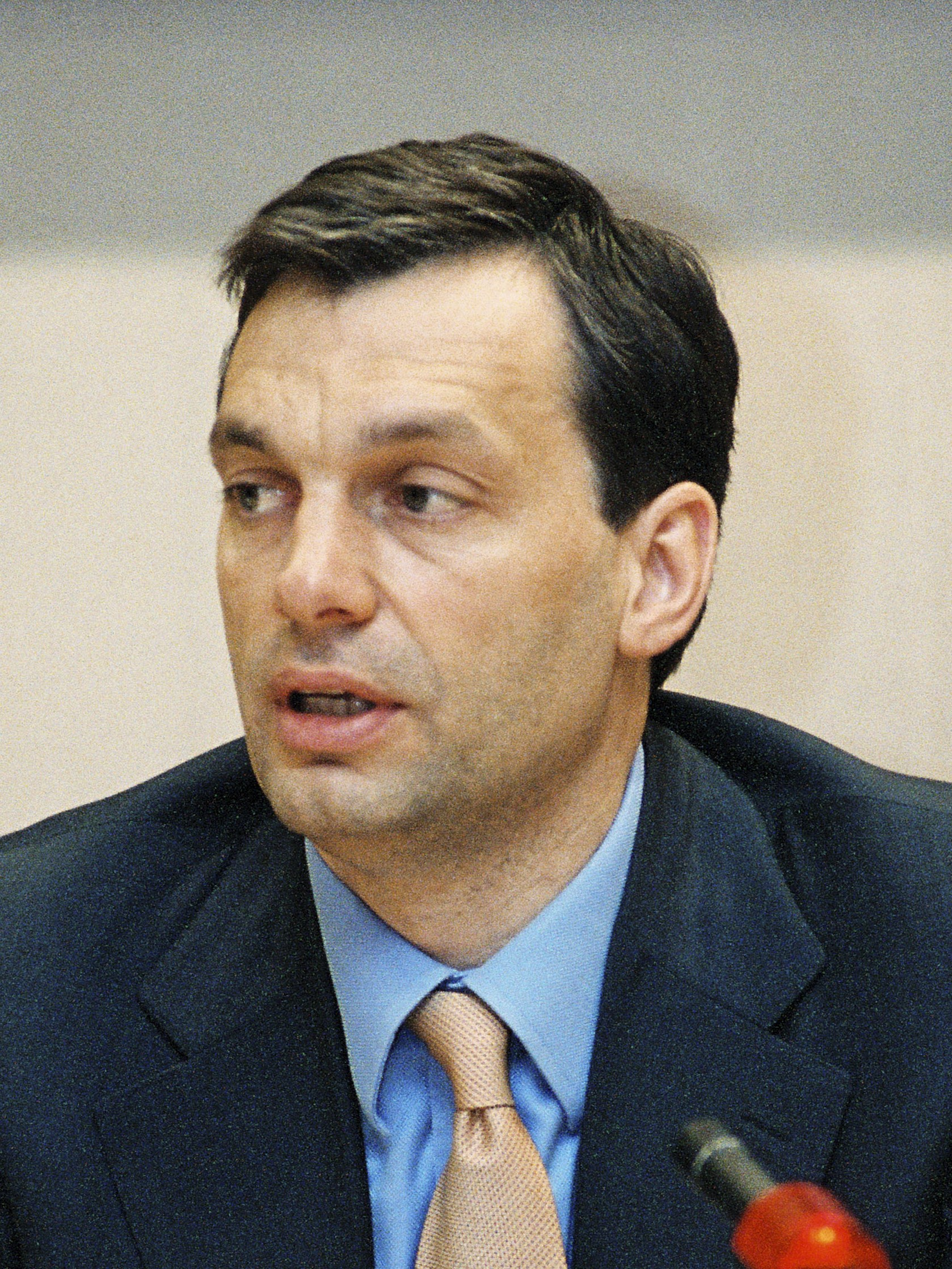

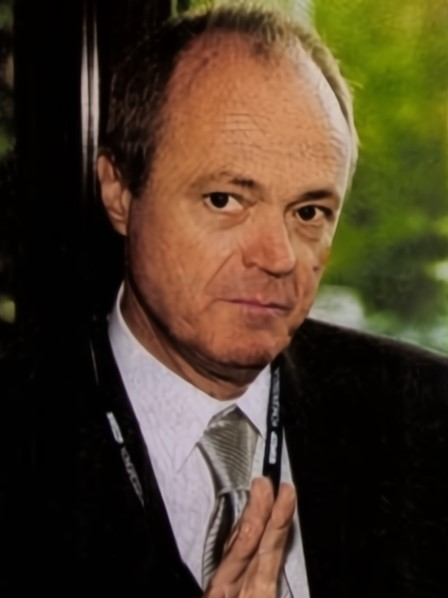

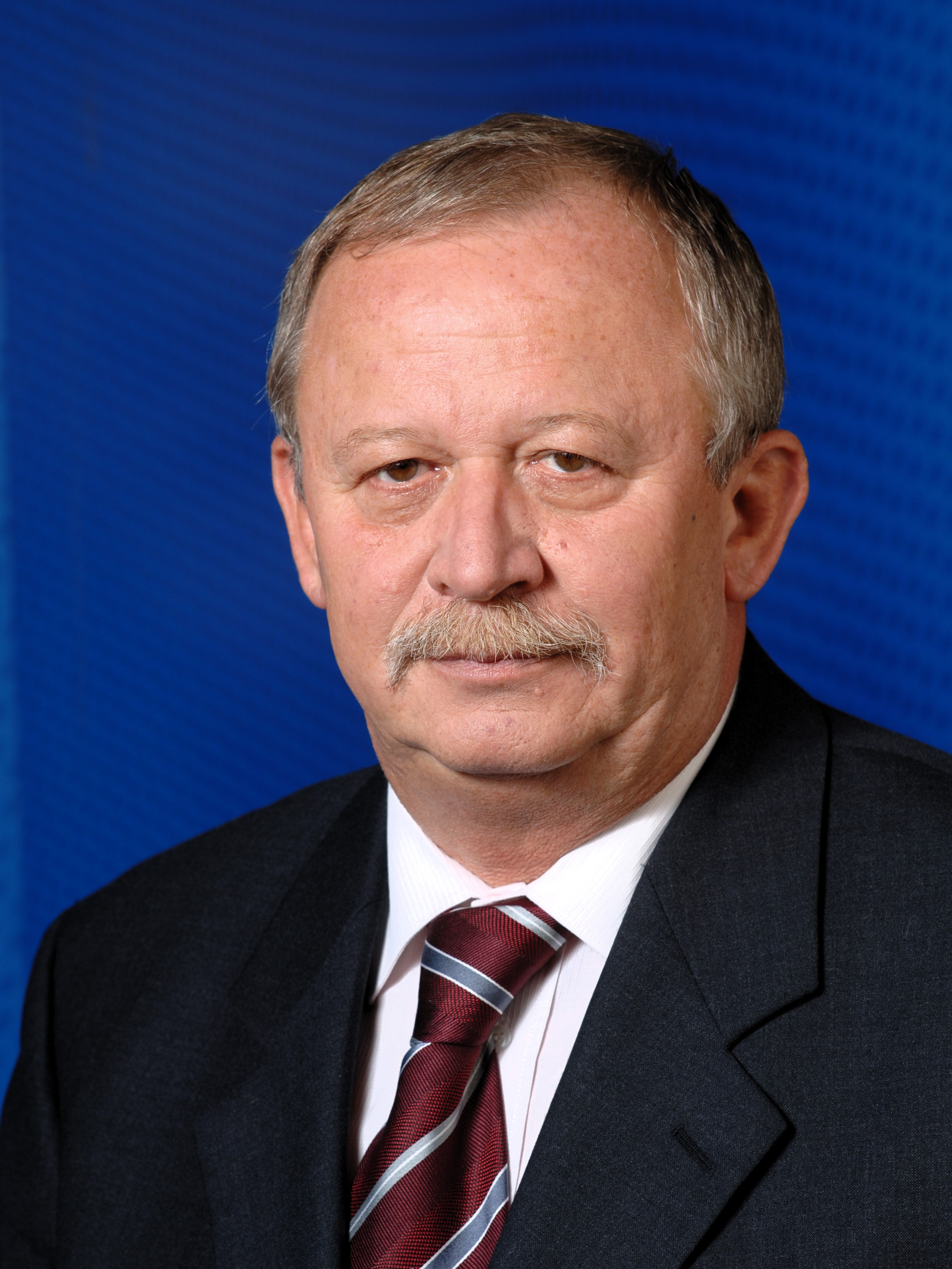
	First party	Second party	Third party
Leader	Viktor Orbán	Péter Medgyessy	Gábor Kuncze
Party	Fidesz	Independent (MSZP)	SZDSZ
Alliance	Fidesz–MDF
Leader since	6 July 1998 (Note: Orbán became Prime Minister on 6 July 1998. He had previously been leader of Fidesz since 18 April 1993, but resigned partway through his premiership in 29 January 2000, and did not become leader again until 17 May 2003.)	9 June 2001 (Note: Medgyessy was selected as the MSZP's Prime Minister candidate in 9 June 2001, but did not join the party.)	1 July 2001
Last election	165 seats, 32.28% (Note: Combined results for Fidesz (148 seats, 29.48%) and MDF (17 seats, 2.80%).)	134 seats, 32.92%	24 seats, 7.57%
Seats won	188	178	20
Seat change	▲23	▲44	▼4 (Note: Including one deputy elected as a joint SZDSZ-MSZP candidate.)
1R vote and %	2,217,755 (39.4%)	2,277,732 (40.5%)	380,982 (6.8%)
2R vote and %	2,196,540 (50.0%)	2,011,845 (45.8%)	126,966 (2.9%)
Party vote	2,306,763	2,361,983	313,084
% and swing	41.07% ▲8.79 pp	42.05% ▲9.13 pp	5.57% ▼2.00 pp
- Results of the election. A darker shade indicates a higher vote share. Proportional list results are displayed in the top left.
Government before election
First Orbán Government
Fidesz–FKGP–MDF
Government after election
Medgyessy Government
MSZP–SZDSZ

Parliamentary elections were held in Hungary on 7 April 2002, with a second round of voting in 131 of the 176 single member constituencies on 21 April.

Although Fidesz–Hungarian Democratic Forum gained the most seats in the National Assembly despite receiving fewer votes than the Hungarian Socialist Party, the alliance narrowly failed to gain an absolute majority. Therefore, the centre-left party was able to form a coalition government with the Alliance of Free Democrats, just like in 1994.

== Electoral system ==
The unicameral National Assembly (Országgyűlés), the highest organ of state authority, initiates and approves legislation sponsored by the prime minister. A party had to win at least 5% of the national vote (based on the total of regional list votes) to form a parliamentary faction. The National Assembly had 386 members, elected for a four-year term in a mixed system: 176 members in single-seat constituencies by a modified two-round system, 152 in multi-seat constituencies by party-list proportional representation (using territorial lists) and 58 members (using a national list) to realize semi-proportional representation.

== Results ==
Party	Proportional			SMCs (first round)			SMCs (second round)			Seats		
Party	Votes	%	Seats	Votes	%	Seats	Votes	%	Seats	National	Total	+/–
Hungarian Socialist Party	2,361,997	42.05	69	2,277,732	40.50	24	2,011,845	45.77	54	31	178	+44
Fidesz–Hungarian Democratic Forum	2,306,763	41.07	67	2,217,755	39.43	20	2,196,540	49.97	75	26	188	+23
Alliance of Free Democrats	313,084	5.57	4	380,982	6.77	0	126,966	2.89	2	13	19	–5
Hungarian Justice and Life Party	245,326	4.37	0	257,455	4.58	0	325	0.01	0	0	0	–14
Centre Party–Christian Democratic People's Party	219,029	3.90	0	182,256	3.24	0	5,280	0.12	0	0	0	New
Workers' Party	121,503	2.16	0	108,732	1.93	0				0	0	0
Independent Smallholders' Party	42,338	0.75	0	67,401	1.20	0	692	0.02	0	0	0	–48
New Left Party	3,198	0.06	0	5,597	0.10	0				0	0	New
Reform Smallholders' Party	1,086	0.02	0	2,758	0.05	0				0	0	New
Social Democratic Party	912	0.02	0	590	0.01	0				0	0	0
Hungarian Roma Party	745	0.01	0	589	0.01	0				0	0	New
Smallholders' Party, Party of Smallholders' Alliance	451	0.01	0	2,699	0.05	0				0	0	New
Hungarian Entrepreneurs' United Party	318	0.01	0	1,288	0.02	0				0	0	New
Hungarian Socialist Party–Social Democratic Party				41,461	0.74	0	40,709	0.93	0	0	0	–
Alliance of Free Democrats–Hungarian Socialist Party				27,892	0.50	1	13,101	0.30	0	0	1	–
Green Party of Hungary				2,221	0.04	0				0	0	0
Party of the Hungarian Interest				919	0.02	0				0	0	New
Union for Solidarity				793	0.01	0				0	0	New
Hungarian Pensioners' Party				685	0.01	0				0	0	New
Hungarian Socialist Workers' Party				612	0.01	0				0	0	0
Independent Hungarian Democratic Party				531	0.01	0				0	0	0
Civic Democratic Party against Corruption				261	0.00	0				0	0	New
Democratic Roma Party				171	0.00	0				0	0	New
Independents				43,215	0.77	0				0	0	–1
Total	5,616,750	100.00	140	5,624,595	100.00	45	4,395,458	100.00	131	70	386	0
Valid votes	5,616,750	98.88		5,624,595	99.02		4,395,458	99.39				
Invalid/blank votes	63,897	1.12		55,863	0.98		26,963	0.61				
Total votes	5,680,647	100.00		5,680,458	100.00		4,422,421	100.00				
Registered voters/turnout	8,061,101	70.47		8,061,101	70.47		6,018,069	73.49				
Source: Valasztas, Election Resources

=== Party list results by county ===
County	MSZP	Fidesz–MDF	SZDSZ	MIÉP	CP–KDNP	MP	FKGP	Others
Bács-Kiskun	35.60	49.84	4.38	3.62	3.13	1.95	1.50	-
Baranya	46.73	38.59	5.08	3.09	3.40	2.46	0.65	-
Békés	42.45	40.98	4.36	3.68	3.52	3.58	1.42	-
Borsod-Abaúj-Zemplén	47.86	37.80	3.52	3.67	3.72	2.68	0.47	0.26
Budapest	44.12	31.58	9.56	6.96	5.72	1.80	0.27	-
Csongrád	40.50	43.16	4.48	3.67	4.59	2.42	1.04	0.14
Fejér	42.20	43.39	4.80	3.36	3.86	1.90	0.49	-
Győr-Moson-Sopron	36.24	51.15	4.10	3.26	3.23	1.50	0.53	-
Hajdú-Bihar	39.54	47.72	3.76	3.25	2.54	1.79	1.26	0.15
Heves	47.24	36.69	4.91	4.43	2.62	3.16	0.66	0.28
Jász-Nagykun-Szolnok	46.15	37.96	4.41	3.68	2.68	3.74	1.37	-
Komárom-Esztergom	49.33	36.35	5.04	3.10	3.21	2.17	0.56	0.24
Nógrád	43.50	39.13	3.89	3.35	2.57	6.68	0.48	0.41
Pest	40.27	41.04	6.65	5.65	3.95	1.58	0.69	0.17
Somogy	41.47	43.96	3.66	3.36	4.47	1.95	1.12	-
Szabolcs-Szatmár-Bereg	42.62	44.99	2.73	2.81	3.45	1.44	1.39	0.58
Tolna	41.02	44.17	5.05	3.93	2.84	2.23	0.77	-
Vas	32.39	53.48	5.41	3.06	3.59	1.22	0.73	0.12
Veszprém	37.00	48.08	5.24	3.35	3.74	1.78	0.49	0.32
Zala	36.47	49.49	4.47	3.76	3.24	1.68	0.90	-
Total	42.05	41.07	5.57	4.37	3.90	2.16	0.75	0.12
