= Duna Kör =

Hungarian environmental organization

Duna Kör (English: Danube Circle) is a Hungarian environmental organization founded in 1984 as a protest body to prevent the construction of the Gabčíkovo – Nagymaros Dams. Opponents of the dam argued that it would create an environmental disaster that would displace thousands of Hungarians from villages and towns where their families had lived for centuries. Opponents of the regime soon joined this burgeoning environmental protest and by the fall of 1988 the Danube Circle had about 10,000 core followers who actively demonstrated against the dam in the streets of Budapest. These actions mirrored protests earlier in the summer of 1988, in which more than 30,000 people marched in Budapest to express their anger over the Romanian government’s plan to bulldoze entire Hungarian villages in Transylvania. Hungary had not seen public protests on this scale since 1956.

It is significant in that it is seen to be the start of the erosion of Communist power in Hungary, which ended in May 1990 with the first free democratic elections.

The founder was biologist János Vargha. The organization was awarded the Right Livelihood Award in 1985 for "working under unusually difficult circumstances to preserve the river Danube, a vital part of Hungary's environment."
