= Workers' Party of Hungary 2006 – European Left =

Workers' Party of Hungary 2006 – European Left Magyarországi Munkáspárt 2006 – Európai Baloldal
- Leader: Attila Vajnai
- Founded: November 2005
- Split from: Hungarian Communist Workers' Party
- Headquarters: Budapest
- Ideology: Eurocommunism; Marxism
- Political position: Left-wing
- National affiliation: Social Democratic Party of Hungary
- European affiliation: Party of the European Left
- Colors: Red
- National Assembly: 0 / 199
- European Parliament: 0 / 21

Website
- munkaspart-2006.hu

The Workers' Party of Hungary 2006 – European Left (Hungarian: Magyarországi Munkáspárt 2006 – Európai Baloldal), shortly European Left is a political party in Hungary. It was created in mid-November 2005 from the internal opposition of the Hungarian Workers' Party (then the Hungarian Communist Workers' Party). Its leader is János Fratanolo.

Its request to become a member of the Party of the European Left was accepted by the EL Executive Board, during the meeting held in Geneva from 23 to 25 October 2009.

== History ==
On 8 September 2016, the Táncsics – Radical Left Party (then known as the Left Party) announced on its website that the two parties will cooperate in preparation for the 2018 parliamentary election.

In early 2022, the Social Democratic Party of Hungary announced on its website that the two parties will cooperate in preparation for the 2022 parliamentary election. Joining forces, the two parties did not manage to stand a single official candidate in the election according to the official website of the election office, valasztas.hu. Also in 2022, the People's Front announced that they will join the party but will continue as a political organization. (As of 2026, the “People’s Front” no longer exists.)

While the party is active in other ways, it has not participated in recent elections. For example, it has not successfully fielded any candidate in the 2022 parliamentary election, in the 2024 European Parliamentary election or in the local elections in 2024.

== See also ==
- Green Left (Hungary)
