= Centre Party (Hungary) =

Centre Party Centrum Párt
- Leader: Mihály Kupa (2001–2007); Ágnes Pászti (2007–2009); János Papp (2009–2010); Lajos Szabó (2010–2013)
- Founded: 21 December 2001
- Dissolved: 17 October 2013
- Merged into: Community for Social Justice People's Party
- Political position: Centre

Website
- www.centrum-part.eu

The Centre Party (Hungarian: Centrumpárt, pronounced [ˈt͡sɛntrumˈpaːrt]) was a centrist political party in Hungary.

== History ==
The Centre Party came into being in 2001, with the cooperation of the Christian Democratic People's Party (KDNP), the Hungarian Democratic People's Party (MDNP), the Alliance of Green Democrats (ZDSZ) and Third Way for Hungary (HOM). The unusual alliance of centre-right and centre-left groups hindered the Centre Party's effectiveness and, eventually, two of the founding political formations quit the party. The Christian Democratic People's Party, after long internal disputes and legal battles, joined ranks with Viktor Orbán's Fidesz and the Hungarian Democratic People's Party re-merged with the Hungarian Democratic Forum (MDF). Mihály Kupa was the leader of the party until 2007. At the legislative elections, on 9 and 23 April 2006, the party won 0.32% of the popular vote and no seats.

The Centre party joined as a member to the Community for Social Justice People's Party (KTI) in 2013.

== Electoral results ==
=== National Assembly ===
Election year	National Assembly				Government
Election year	# of overall votes	% of overall vote	# of overall seats won	+/–	Government
2002	219,029	3.9 % (#5)	0 / 386	New	extra-parliamentary
2006	17,431	0.32 %	0 / 386	0	extra-parliamentary
