= Gabčíkovo–Nagymaros Dams =

Reservoir, dam and hydroelectric power station

Coordinates: 47°52′48″N 17°32′21″E

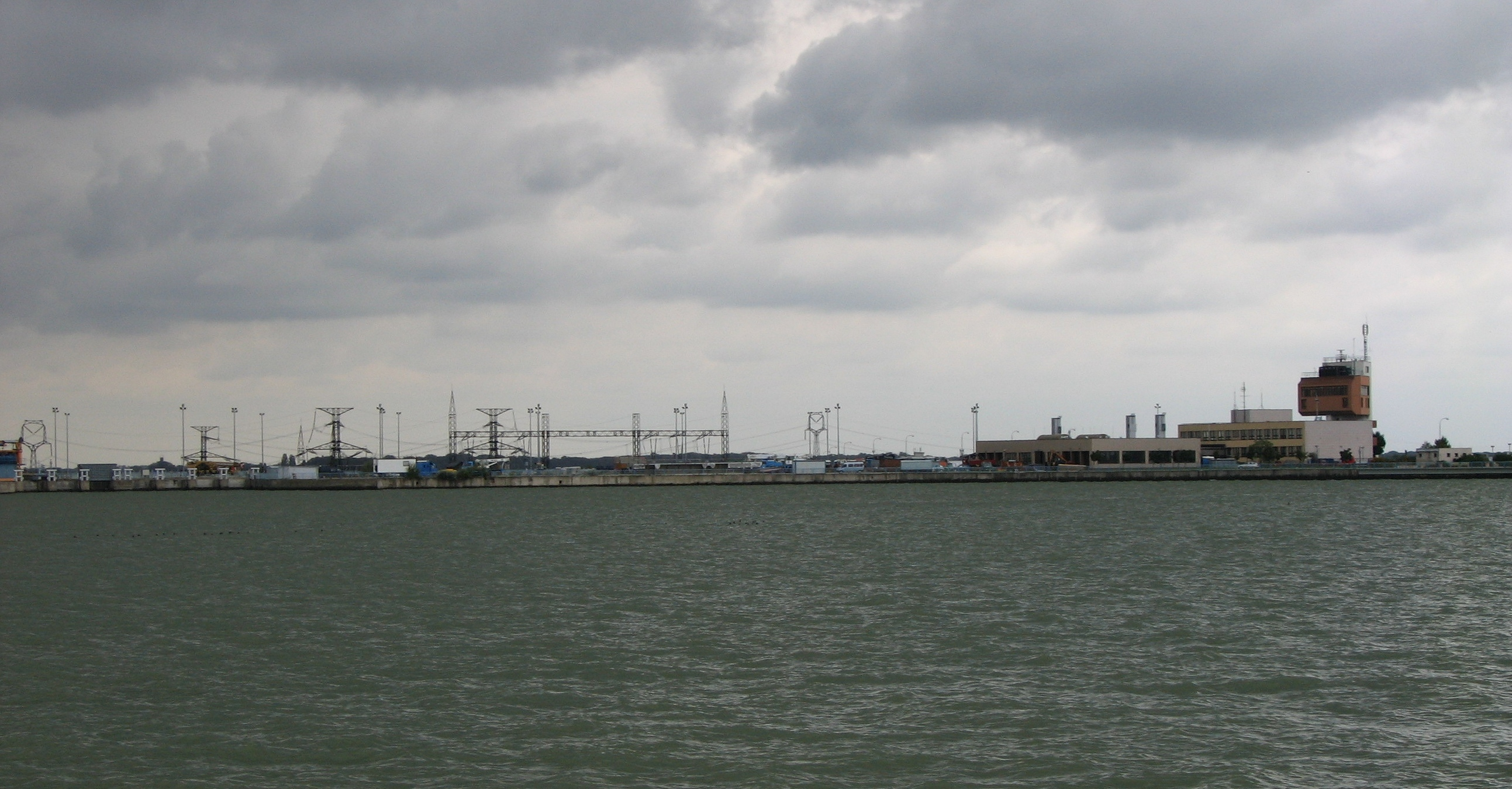
Gabčíkovo–Nagymaros Dams

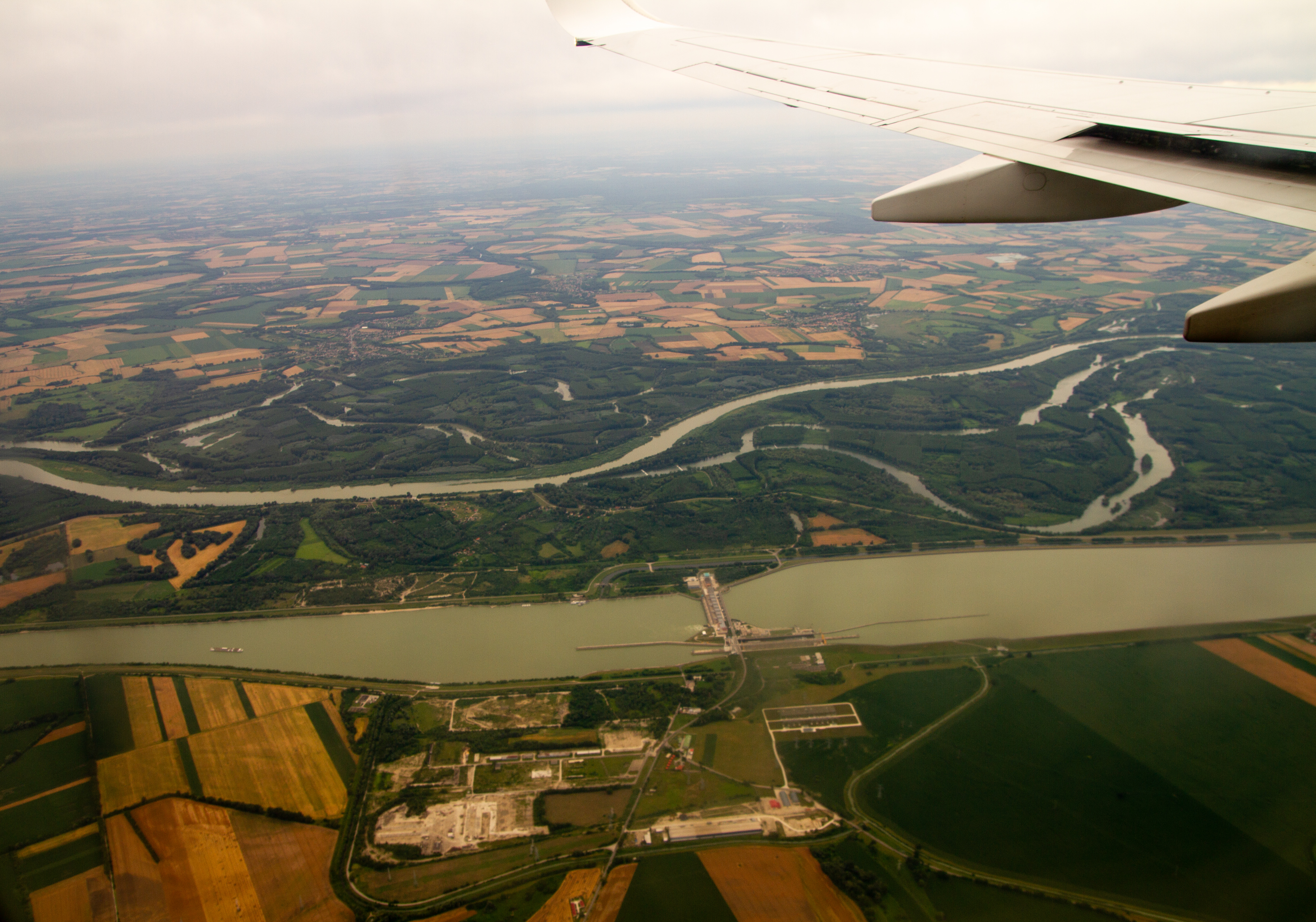
Gabčíkovo: Aerial view

The Gabčíkovo–Nagymaros Dams (more precisely Gabčíkovo–Nagymaros Waterworks, Hungarian: Bős–nagymarosi vízlépcső, Slovak: Sústava vodných diel Gabčíkovo – Nagymaros) is a large barrage project on the Danube. It was initiated by the Budapest Treaty of 16 September 1977 between the Czechoslovak Socialist Republic and the Hungarian People's Republic. The project 's objectives included flood control, improving river navigability, and producing clean electricity.

Only a part of the project has been finished in Slovakia, under the name Gabčíkovo Dam, because Hungary first suspended, then tried to terminate, the project due to environmental and economic concerns. Slovakia proceeded with an alternative solution, called "Variant C", which involved diverting the Danube, the border river. These caused a still unresolved international dispute between Slovakia and Hungary. Both parties turned to the International Court of Justice for a ruling.

== Budapest Treaty ==
The joint Hungarian–Czechoslovak project was agreed upon on 16 September 1977 in the "Budapest Treaty". The treaty envisioned a cross-border barrage system between the towns of Gabčíkovo, Czechoslovak Socialist Republic (now Slovak Republic) and Nagymaros, People's Republic of Hungary (now Hungary). The dams would eliminate regular flooding (like the disastrous ones of 1954 and 1965) and provide a clean source of electric power. They would also allow year-long navigability of the river and serve as a part of the Rhine-Main-Danube Canal system of inland navigation.

The plan was to divert part of the river into an artificial canal at Dunakiliti (a village in Hungary) to the hydroelectric power plant near Gabčíkovo (eight turbines, 720 MW). The canal would return the water into a deepened original riverbed and at Nagymaros a smaller dam and power-plant (158 MW) would be constructed. The plant in Gabčíkovo was to be a peak-power plant and the dam in Nagymaros, about 100 km downstream, was to limit fluctuations of the water level.

Because most of the construction was planned to occur in Slovak territory, the Hungarian government was obligated to participate in some construction in Slovakia, to ensure equal investment by both sides. Electricity produced was to be shared equally between the two countries.

An important provision of the treaty was its Article 15.1, which stated: "the Contracting Parties shall ensure, by the means specified in the joint contractual plan, that the quality of the water in the Danube is not impaired as a result of the construction and operation of the System of Locks".

== Limited project ==
In 1981 the two countries agreed to slow down the project because of their economic problems. In 1984 a movement protesting against the dam, the "Danube Circle" (Duna Kör), was founded in Hungary, which was later awarded the Right Livelihood Award and the Goldman Environmental Prize for protecting the Danube. The group objected to the withholding of information on the project from the public by the Communist government to avoid debate on its environmental impact. Biologists worried that the dams would damage both the treasured scenery of the Danube Bend and the underground water reserves on which more than a million Hungarians depend, especially around Budapest. After an intensive campaign the project became widely hated in Hungary as a symbol of the old regime. In Slovakia, construction continued and many people were involved in building the hydro-electric plant. The Hungarian government eventually decided to suspend work until the environmental effects of the project were fully assessed. Soon after, the Slovak authorities decided to unilaterally proceed with an alternative solution, called "Variant C". This effectively diverted the Danube into Slovak territory and kept the development entirely within its borders. This scheme dramatically reduced the amount of water flowing into Hungary and had a significant impact on that nation's water supply and environment. As a result, the Hungarian government attempted to terminate the 1977 Treaty.

The 7 proposals originally put forward by experts from Czechoslovakia in 1992 were as follows.

| Proposal | Description | Comment |
|---|---|---|
| A | Complete the original plans from 1977 together with Hungary. | Slovak preference |
| B | Complete only the Czechoslovak part of the waterworks. | |
| C | Reduce the reservoir, build the waterworks only on the territory of the Slovak Republic and postpone construction at Nagymaros in Hungary. Split the shared reservoir into two with a dam and instead of the dam in Dunakiliti build a dam in Čunovo. This variant is called temporary, as it is technically possible to build the Dunakiliti dam and flood the Čunovo dam in order to finish the waterworks according to the 1977 treaty. | winning project |
| D | Complete only the upper part of the dam and finish the Dunakiliti dam. | |
| E | Use the waterworks only for flood prevention and ensure navigability. | |
| F | Stop construction and retain the site in its current state. | |
| G | Remove all buildings and return the river to its original state. | Hungarian preference |

In the end it was decided to switch to an alternative solution on a smaller scale, Proposal C. The artificial canal would start at Čunovo, part of the Slovak capital city Bratislava, and the Gabčíkovo power plant would operate in run-of-the-river mode with no water level fluctuation. Construction started in November 1991. In October 1992 diversion of part of the water into the canal started and the Čunovo reservoir was filled; the secondary structures (such as the power-plant) were finished and made operational in 1996.

== Parts of the waterworks ==
=== Built parts ===
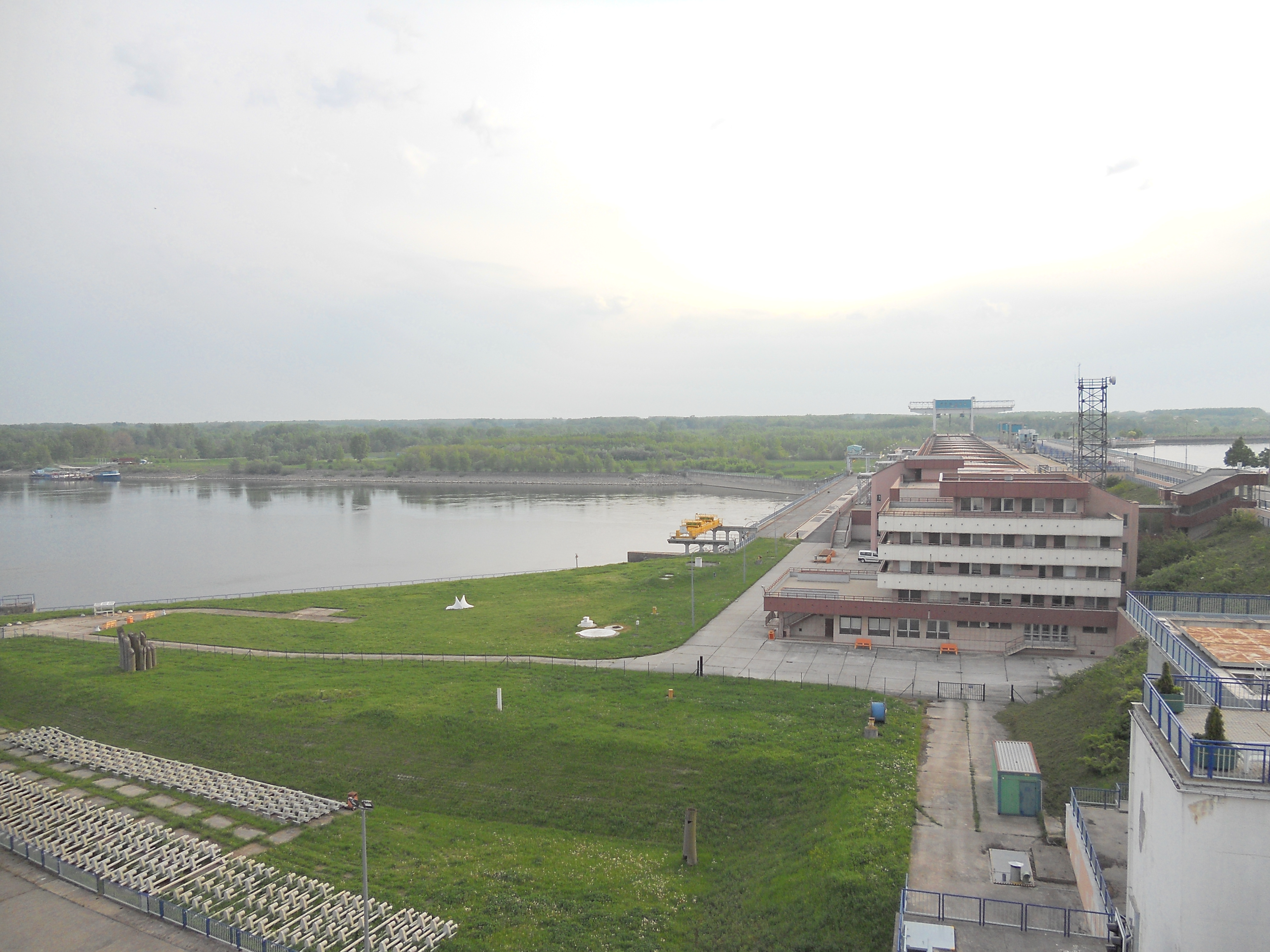
Hydroelectric power station at Gabčíkovo Dam

- Supply channel for Čunovo Dam conveys water from Bratislava about 10 km to Čunovo.
- Čunovo Dam is the first level of the Waterworks, producing 24 MW of electricity, and there is an additional smaller power plant with 1 MW power output. Čunovo includes also the Čunovo Water Sports Centre, a site of world championships in water slalom and rafting.
- Hrušov reservoir (replacing the joint Slovak-Hungarian Dunakiliti reservoir) accumulates water for the main power plant in Gabčíkovo and also regulates water level. It is 16 km long and from 1 to 4 km wide. Its capacity is 196 million cubic metres. As part of the Proposal C redesign, the reservoir was reduced in size and separated from Hungarian territory by a 10.5 km long embankment.
- Gabčíkovo Dam is the main part of the waterworks. It consists of two main structures: a hydropower plant and two lock chambers. This level of the waterworks was designed to use differential water level to produce electricity, to allow ships to pass safely through locks and to divert flood water. The chambers are on the left bank of the Danube and the difference in water levels is about 20 metres. The power plant on the right riverbank was designed to produce 2650 GWh annually. A 10 m wide road bridge passes over the complex. Operation of the power plant is fully automated. In 2012, after 20 years of service, 300.000 ships have passed through the locks with totally 5.000.000 passengers.
- Outlet channel leads water back to the old riverbed and also helps against floods. The channel is 185 m wide at the bottom and 8.2 km long and re-enters the Danube at Sap.
- Regulations in the old Danube riverbed.

=== Nagymaros ===
The waterworks on the Danube were designed to have an additional level at Nagymaros, consisting of a reservoir 95 km long and the Nagymaros power plant. This level was to be located between the Hungarian towns of Visegrád and Nagymaros and its purpose was to use the gradient of the reservoir for production of electricity and also to allow ships to pass. The Gabčíkovo works were designed for control and peak running of the power plant, and the Nagymaros works as an equalising power plant to provide better conditions for shipping and to regulate peak outflow from Gabčíkovo. Because the Nagymaros works were not built, the Gabčíkovo power plant cannot work at peak efficiency, which causes appreciable economic damage. Non-existence of Nagymaros dam also causes main obstacle of inland navigation on the 2400 km Danube Pan-European corridor due to low levels of water. Hungary requests Slovakia to manage regulation works on problematic stretch of Danube that were supposed to be solved by Nagymaros backwater. Transportation damages include also missing upgrade of river Váh waterway in Slovakia.

== Lawsuit ==
After Czechoslovakia split up in 1993, the newly established Slovak Republic carried on with the project. In 1989 Hungary abandoned the site when scientists on both sides of the border expressed fears about the environmental consequences. After Hungary tried to terminate the 1977 treaty in May 1992, both parties (Hungary and Slovakia) agreed to take their dispute to the International Court of Justice in The Hague. In 1994, the Socialists came back into power in Hungary but could hardly back out of the court case, which was hailed as a landmark: for the first time, the court would rule over an environmental dispute. Hearings on the case were held between 3 March and 15 April 1997, and the Court paid a site visit (the first ever in its history). Besides other issues, the Hungarian representatives wanted the court to decide whether or not Czechoslovakia was entitled to embark on Proposal C, and to rule that the 1977 treaty was not binding on Slovakia and Hungary. The court handed down a decision in 1997:

- The Court found that Hungary had breached their legal obligations in almost all points. It ordered Hungary to finish the Nagymaros part of waterworks. Per the Court decision, Czechoslovakia and later Slovakia was entitled to build alternative workaround after Hungary stopped work, but Slovakia breached on one point - it should not have started to operate an alternative temporary solution before the court handed down its ruling. It called on both States to negotiate in good faith to complete the objectives of the 1977 Budapest Treaty, which the Court declared was still in force, while taking account of the factual situation that had developed since 1989.
- Each Party must compensate the other Party for the damage caused by its conduct.

Another four months of negotiations between Slovakia and Hungary led to a treaty between the two countries about the ICJ judgment. In March 1998 the government of Slovakia approved this treaty, but the government of Hungary, which was supposed to build Nagymaros or a Pilismarót waterworks, delayed approving the treaty and proclaimed a competition for the project. After elections in Hungary, the new government cancelled this competition. In 1998, after two appeals to Hungary, the Slovak government turned to the International Court, demanding the Nagymaros part be built.

The international dispute was not resolved for more than a decade. In June 2017, the Slovak Government requested that the International Court of Justice "place on record the discontinuance of the proceedings". In a letter dated 12 July 2017, the Agent of Hungary stated that his Government "did not oppose the discontinuance of the proceedings instituted by means of the Request of Slovakia of 3 September 1998 for an additional judgment".

== Technical parameters ==
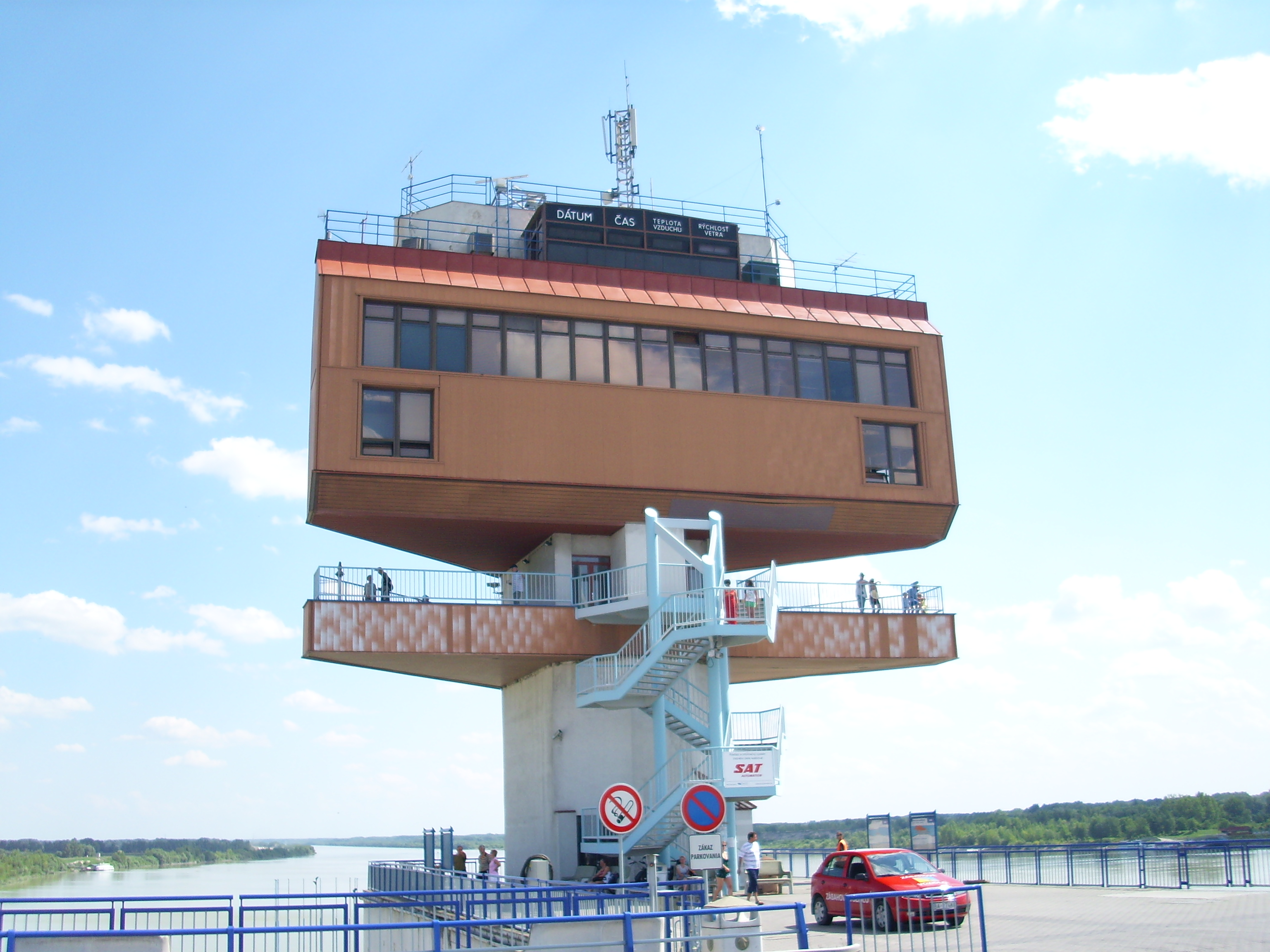
Control tower of the Gabčíkovo Dam

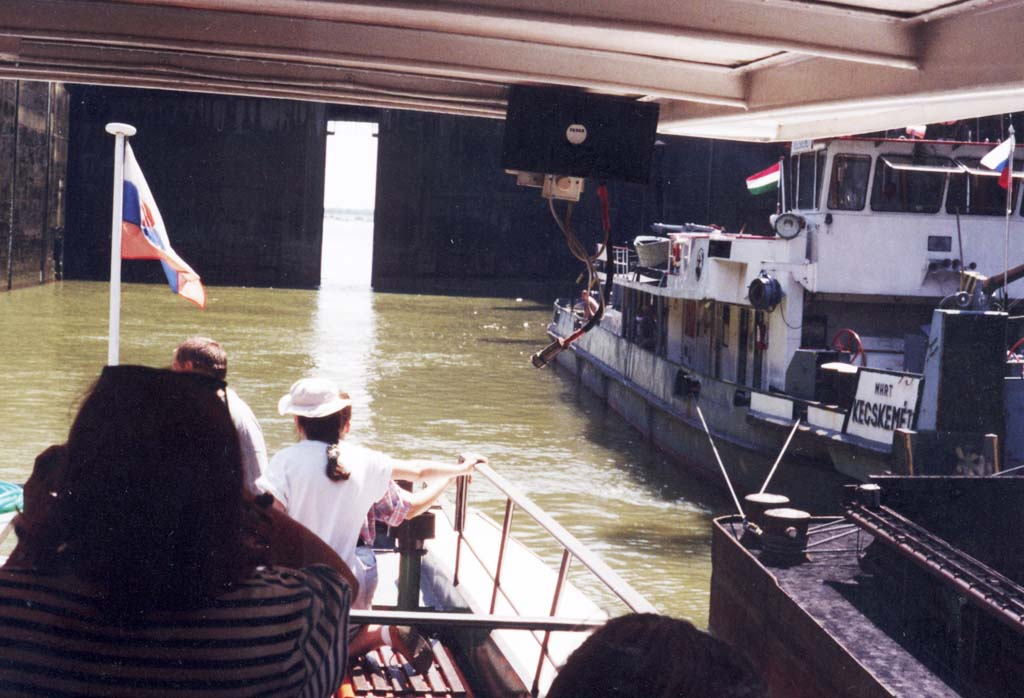
Gabčíkovo sluice

- The area of the Čunovo reservoir is 40 km^{2}, exclusively on the Slovak side (the original Hrušov-Dunakiliti reservoir was to be 60 km^{2}). The operational water level is 131.1 metres above sea level (minimal and maximum levels are 129 and 131.5 m respectively).
- The power station has eight vertical Kaplan turbines with runners 9.3 m in diameter and a maximum capacity of 90 MW each. Total capacity is 720 MW at operational discharge of 4000 m^{3}/s. Water level differences are 24 and 12.88 m.
- The original river bed has a discharge of between 250 and 600 m^{3}/s.
- Two navigation locks were built. A bypass canal will handle floods.
- In 1996, Europe's largest artificial whitewater slalom course, the Water Sports Centre Čunovo, was built on a river island at the head of the bypass canal. When operating at capacity, it diverts 22 m^{3}/s into the bypass canal.
- The Gabčíkovo Hydroelectric Power Station produces 2600 GWh of electricity annually, making it the largest hydroelectric plant in Slovakia. It supplies around 8% of the country's electricity consumption.

== Environmental consequences ==
Regarding the environmental consequences of the dam, results of a 1996–2002 study by K. Holubová, Z. Capeková and J. Szolgay were:

- Intensive degradation of the Danube River bed downstream (especially at the Old Danube river bed) caused by the absence of the Nagymaros waterworks.
- Decreased water level,
- Increased sediment supply,
- Increased amounts of bedload and higher intensity of bedload movements,
- Reduced flood capacity,
- Decreased channel stability,

Annual joint studies of the Slovak-Hungarian governments claim:

- Stabilization of groundwater levels, local improvement of groundwater quality,
- Stabilization of the riverbed of the old Danube.
- Improved living conditions of aquatic animals and forest animals in areas around old Danube.

Differences between 2002 study and newer works may be attributed to size of studied area. As 1996–2002 study was done on area from Vienna to end of Slovak-Hungarian Danube. Government studies are targeting only Gabčíkovo waterworks and immediate area around it.

Groundwater levels are dependent on big floods, like in 2002, which removed fine silt from river bottom and allowed increased filtration. After that groundwater levels on many places reached pre-reservoir filling levels, on some places reached even higher. Damming of the Danube improved ground water quality at Rusovce and Čuňovo water supply which are on right side of Danube. It was due changed infiltration conditions and changed groundwater flow direction from NW-SE to N-S. The ground water quality at water supplies situated on the left side of the Danube were not influenced to the same extent as on the right side.

One of the same problems identified is increased sedimentation upstream and riverbed erosion downstream from reservoir, which is a typical problem of water reservoirs.

== See also ==
- List of crossings of the Danube River

== Sources ==
- Chmelár, V.: Dunaj energetický, vyd. Electra Žilina, 1992
