= Malév Flight 240 =

1975 aviation incident

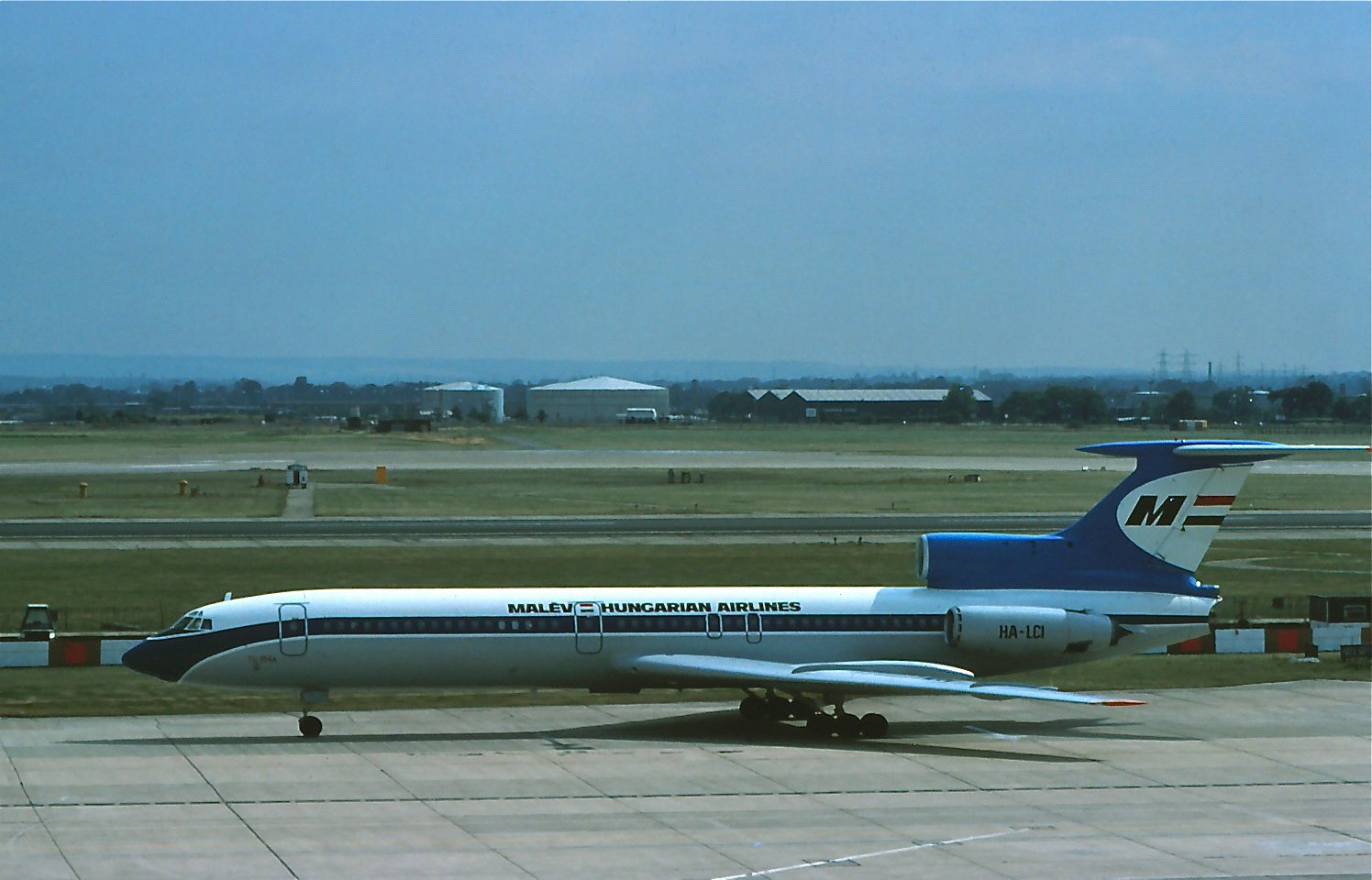
- HA-LCI, the aircraft involved in the accident, seen at Heathrow Airport in August 1975

Occurrence
- Date: 30 September 1975
- Summary: Crashed into sea; cause undetermined
- Site: Mediterranean Sea near Beirut International Airport, Beirut, Lebanon

Aircraft
- Aircraft type: Tupolev Tu-154B-2
- Operator: Malév Hungarian Airlines
- IATA flight No.: MA240
- ICAO flight No.: MAH240
- Call sign: MALEV 240
- Registration: HA-LCI
- Flight origin: Budapest Ferihegy International Airport, Budapest, Hungary
- Destination: Beirut International Airport, Beirut, Lebanon
- Passengers: 50
- Crew: 10
- Fatalities: 60
- Survivors: 0

Malév Flight 240 was a regular service from Budapest Ferihegy International Airport, Hungary, to Beirut International Airport, Lebanon. On 30 September 1975, the aircraft operating the route, a Tupolev Tu-154 of Malév Hungarian Airlines, went missing on its final approach for landing in the Mediterranean Sea just off the coast of Lebanon. All fifty passengers and ten crew on board are thought to have been killed. No official statement was ever made on the crash and its cause has never been publicly disclosed.

== Flight crew ==
The Flight Captain was János Pintér (42) with 3,700 flying hours of experience, 1,400 of them on the Tupolev 154. First officer was Károly Kvasz (36), who had 3,300 flying hours, 1,245 of them on the Tu-154. Árpád Mohovits (43) was the third pilot in the cockpit, responsible for navigation. His total flying experience amounted to 1,300 hours. The flight engineer was 39-year-old István Horváth with 1,600 hours of flying experience. In addition, a maintenance engineer named László Majoros accompanied the flight.

The cabin crew consisted of five flight attendants.

== Possible cause ==
According to unidentified witnesses, the plane was shot down, seen by a British military pilot and radar operators on a British radar station in Cyprus.

It has been suggested that the flight was shot down by the Israeli or Syrian air force. In his book "Das Geheimnis von Malev Flug 240 - mysteriöser Absturz vor Beirut", Austrian aviation expert and journalist Patrick Huber, citing the Hungarian TV documentary "A Malév 240-es járatának története", writes that an informant named "Jessica", who spoke English with a British accent, said in an interview that the plane was shot down by an Israeli F-4 Phantom II fighter jet. According to the informant, she was stationed with the Royal Air Force in Cyprus at the time. For the book, the Austrian expert also interviewed László Németh, the husband of one of the stewardesses who died on board. At a personal meeting between the two men in Budapest in February 2024, Nemeth confirmed to Huber the authenticity of the informant "Jessica".

In an interview with Patrick Huber for his book at the beginning of 2024, László Németh said: "I also had a conversation with the officer who was in charge of passport control for VIP passengers that day. He confirmed to me that he was specially called into duty to handle the Palestinian delegation, but that these people never came. He said that he stayed at the airport until the plane took off. Another Malév employee, who was responsible for the passenger manifest, left the airport with the documents before the plane took off. The Palestinian delegation was therefore on his documents, although it never actually arrived at the airport. Consequently, he also reported to his superiors that the Palestinians were on this flight, because he assumed that they were and did not even know that the men were no-shows. This meant that the 53 Palestinians appeared in all of Malév's official records and I have every reason to believe that the Israeli secret service therefore also assumed that they had actually boarded the flight. At the end of the day, the shooting down was probably simply an intelligence error. "

== Media coverage of the incident ==
On 27 September 2007, Hungarian politician György Szilvásy, then Minister of Civil Intelligence Services, wrote a letter to Róbert Répássy, Fidesz party member of the Hungarian Parliament, stating that Hungarian civilian national security services (Információs Hivatal and Constitution Protection Office) had produced a report on the crash in 2003, and that the report stated that there were no available original (secret service) documents concerning the case. Szilvásy's letter affirmed that the report remains top secret, for reasons not connected to the crash.

Hungarian television station Hír TV has carried a documentary film covering the incident. In December 2008, Dutch broadcaster NTR aired a piece on Malév Flight 240 alleging that there is existing photographic documentation of the search and rescue or recovery operation, and that fifteen unidentified bodies were recovered.

== Video recordings ==
- Titkok légijárata (Flight of Secrets) – Youtube.com, documentary in Hungarian
- Az elveszett járat - MA 240 (The lost flight - MA 240) – Youtube.com, documentary in Hungarian
