= Budapest 2nd constituency =

Hungarian legislative district

Budapest 2nd constituency (District XI.)
- Constituency for the National Assembly
- Location of Budapest 02 within Budapest

- Location of Budapest within Hungary
- City: Budapest
- Electorate: 69,335 (2018)
- Major settlements: 11th District

Current constituency
- Created: 2011
- Party: Tisza Party
- Member: Kriszta Bódis
- Created from: Constituency no. 15; Constituency no. 16; Constituency no. 17
- Elected: 2026

The 2nd constituency of Budapest (Hungarian: Budapesti 02. számú országgyűlési egyéni választókerület) is one of the single-member constituencies of the National Assembly, the national legislature of Hungary. The constituency standard abbreviation: Budapest 02. OEVK.

Since 2026, it has been represented by Kriszta Bódis of the Tisza Party party.

== Geography ==
The 2nd constituency is located in the south-western part of Buda.

The constituency borders the 3rd constituency to the north, 1st constituency to the northeast, 6th constituency to the southeast, 18th constituency to the south and 2nd constituency of Pest County to the west.

=== List of districts ===
The constituency includes the following municipalities:

1. District XI.: Main (inner) part of the district (except Nándorkert, Albertfalva, Kelenvölgy and Péterhegy).

== History ==
The current 2nd constituency of Budapest was created in 2011 and contains parts of the pre-2011 15th, 16th and 17th constituencies of the capital. Its borders have not changed since its creation.

== Members ==
The constituency was first represented by István Simicskó of the KDNP from 2014 to 2022. He was succeeded by Anna Orosz of the Momentum Movement in 2022 (with United for Hungary support). In the 2026 election, Kriszta Bódis of the Tisza Party was elected representative.

Election	Member	Party	%	Ref.
2014	István Simicskó	KDNP	44.78	
2018	István Simicskó	KDNP	42.16	
2022 (Note: Orosz was a member of Momentum. She ran as a joint candidate of the United for Hungary electoral alliance during the 2022 parliamentary election.)	Anna Orosz	Momentum	51.94	
2026	Kriszta Bódis	TISZA	62.87	

== Election result ==
=== 2026 election ===
Result 2026
1. Kriszta Bódis, Tisza Party (63.8%)
2. Orsolya Ferencz, Fidesz–KDNP (29.4%)
3. Károly Kvacskay, Our Homeland (3.44%)
4. Andrea Gergely, MKKP (1.28%)
5. Richárd Halmai, DK (1.04%)
6. Other parties (less than 1%) (0.99%)

2026 parliamentary election: Budapest - 2nd constituency
Party	Candidate	Votes	%	±%
Tisza	Kriszta Bódis	35,772	63.80	New
Fidesz–KDNP	Orsolya Ferencz	16,512	29.45	−11.28
Mi Hazánk	Károly Kvacskay	1,929	3.44	+0.36
MKKP	Andrea Gergely	717	1.28	−1.71
DK	Richárd Halmai	582	1.04	New
Independent	Antal Csárdi	511	0.91	New
Szolidaritás	György Simon	47	0.08	New
Majority		19,260	34.35	+23.14
Turnout		56,318	73.75	▼7.28
Registered electors		76,449		
Tisza gain from United for Hungary		Swing		

=== 2022 election ===
Result 2022
1. Anna Orosz, United for Hungary (52.0%)
2. István Simicskó, Fidesz–KDNP (40.7%)
3. Előd Novák, Our Homeland (3.10%)
4. Miklós Mendly, MKKP (3.00%)
5. Other parties (less than 1%) (1.20%)

2022 parliamentary election: Budapest - 2nd constituency
Party	Candidate	Votes	%	±%
United for Hungary	Anna Orosz	27,881	51.94	
Fidesz–KDNP	Dr. István Simicskó	21,864	40.73	−1.43
Mi Hazánk	Előd Novák	1,653	3.08	New
MKKP	Miklós Mendly	1,607	2.99	+1.21
MEMO	Gábor Szenes	458	0.85	New
NÉP	Piroska Billein	159	0.3	New
Leftist Alliance	György Barabás	56	0.1	
Majority		6,017	11.21	
Turnout		54,198	81.09	▲0.31
Registered electors		66,833		
United for Hungary gain from Fidesz–KDNP		Swing	+9.6	

=== 2018 election ===
Result 2018
1. Dr. István Simicskó, Fidesz–KDNP (42.2%)
2. Erzsébet Gy. Németh, DK (40.5%)
3. Máté Kreitler-Sas, LMP (6.10%)
4. Dr. András Bardócz-Tódor, Jobbik (5.90%)
5. Dávid Bedő, Momentum (2.80%)
6. András Horváth, MKKP (1.80%)
7. Other parties (less than 1%) (0.70%)

2018 parliamentary election: Budapest - 2nd constituency
Party	Candidate	Votes	%	±%
Fidesz–KDNP	Dr. István Simicskó	23,403	42.16	−2.62
DK	Erzsébet Gy. Németh	22,494	40.53	as Unity
LMP	Máté Kreitler-Sas	3,384	6.1	−2.52
Jobbik	Dr. András Bardócz-Tódor	3,252	5.86	−2.16
Momentum	Dávid Bedő	1,540	2.77	New
MKKP	Roland Fischer	990	1.78	New
Workers' Party	Gábor Benyovszky	248	0.46	−0.03
SEM	Frizsina Zsuzsanna Petre-Varga	195	0.35	−0.65
Majority		909	1.63	
Turnout		56,006	80.78	▲5.57
Registered electors		69,335		
Fidesz–KDNP hold		Swing	-6.4	

=== 2014 election ===
Result 2014
1. Dr. István Simicskó, Fidesz–KDNP (44.8%)
2. Dr. István Józsa, Unity (36.7%)
3. Antal Csárdi, LMP (8.60%)
4. Előd Attila Novák, Jobbik (8.00%)
5. Frizsina Zsuzsanna Petre-Varga, SEM (1.00%)
6. Other parties (less than 1%) (0.90%)

2014 parliamentary election: Budapest - 2nd constituency
Party	Candidate	Votes	%	±%
Fidesz–KDNP	Dr. István Simicskó	23,963	44.78	
Unity	Dr. István Józsa	19,643	36.71	
LMP	Antal Csárdi	4,615	8.62	
Jobbik	Előd Attila Novák	4,291	8.02	
SEM	Frizsina Zsuzsanna Petre-Varga	534	1.0	
Workers' Party	Gábor Benyovszky	262	0.49	
JESZ	Péter Nagy	207	0.39	
Majority		4,320	8.07	
Turnout		54,118	75.21	
Registered electors		71,957		
Fidesz–KDNP win (new seat)				
