= István Simicskó =

Hungarian politician

István Simicskó MP
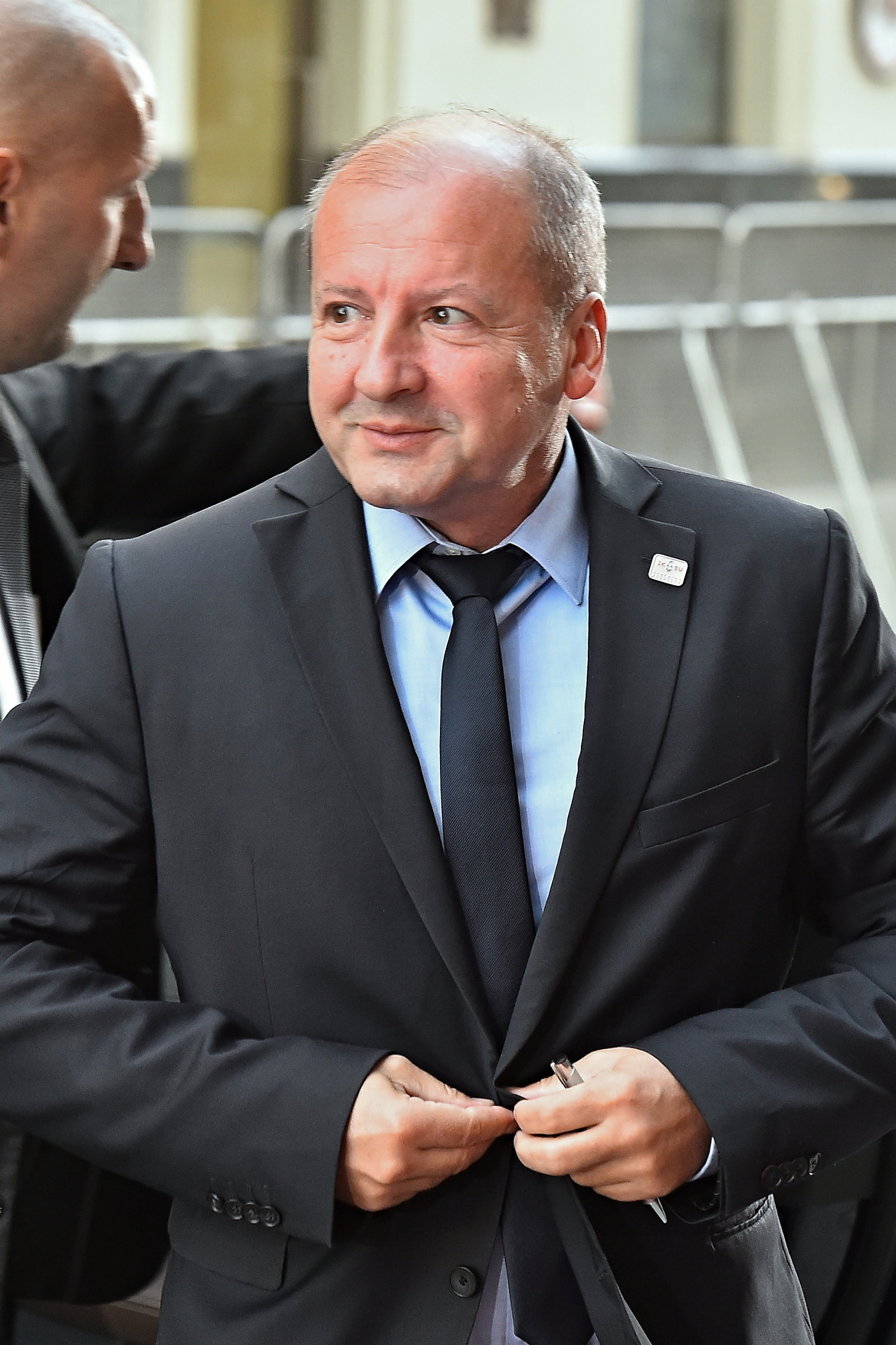

Minister of Defence
- In office 10 September 2015 – 18 May 2018
- Prime Minister: Viktor Orbán
- Preceded by: Csaba Hende
- Succeeded by: Tibor Benkő

Member of the National Assembly
- Incumbent
- Assumed office 18 June 1998

Personal details
- Born: 29 November 1961 (age 64) Tiszalök, Hungary
- Party: KDNP (1991–1996; 2002– ); Fidesz (1996– )
- Children: 3
- Profession: Politician

István Simicskó (born 29 November 1961) is a Hungarian politician of the Fidesz–KDNP coalition. He has been a Member of the National Assembly since 1998. He served as Minister of Defence from 10 September 2015 to 18 May 2018.

== Studies and personal life ==
Simicskó was born in Tiszalök, Szabolcs-Szatmár-Bereg County on 29 November 1961. He finished his secondary studies at the Jedlik Ányos Secondary Grammar School of Csepel in 1980. He earned a degree in business economics at the College of Commerce, Catering and Tourism in 1985. Between 1999 and 2002, he was educated at the Eötvös Loránd University, where he became a Doctor of Law. Simicskó obtained his PhD degree (military sciences) at the Zrínyi Miklós National Defence University (by now integrated into the National University of Public Service) in 2009.

Simicskó is married and father of three children. He had been a member of the Hungarian Association of Military Science (MHTT) since 1993. He is also involved in the Association of Hungarian Reservists (MATASZ) since 2001. He teaches at the National University of Public Service since 2010. Simicskó is a practitioner of the Wing Tsun, a concept-based Chinese martial art, where he achieved the 4th master level.

Simicskó was elected president of the Hungarian Modern Pentathlon Union (MÖSZ) in May 2022, replacing Gyula Bretz.

== Political career ==
He joined Christian Democratic People's Party (KDNP) in 1991 and served as leader of the party's branch in Kispest from 1994 to 1996. After the party's decline and disintegration, he left KDNP at the end of 1996 and joined the strengthening right-wing Fidesz party.

Simicskó was elected lawmaker from the Budapest regional list of the Fidesz in the 1998 parliamentary election. He became vice-chairman of the Committee of National Defence, a position which he had held until 2006 with short interrupts. After Hungary joining the NATO in 1999, he was delegated to the Defence and Security Committee of the organization's Parliamentary Assembly. He served as Political State Secretary for Ervin Demeter, the Minister of Civilian Intelligence Services, from 3 May 2000 to 27 May 2002, during the First Orbán Cabinet.

In the 2002 national election, Simicskó was re-elected parliamentarian, however the Fidesz was defeated by the MSZP–SZDSZ coalition. In April 2003, Simicskó was the only MP who voted against joining the European Union following a successful membership referendum, where the proposal was approved by 83.8% of voters with a voter turnout of 45.6%. Simicskó then argued that there were numerous "questions and uncertainty" around the enlargement and also added, he represented the "majority of the non-voters" when he rejected the parliament's authorization.

Simicskó rejoined the Christian Democrats, which re-established after continuous inward struggles and legal disputes and entered into an alliance with Fidesz. He was elected one of the vice presidents of the party in 2006. In the 2006 parliamentary election, he became Member of Parliament again and now joined the KDNP parliamentary group. From 2006 to 2010, he functioned as Chairman of the National Security Committee. Simicskó was elected MP for Újbuda (Budapest Constituency XVI) during the 2010 parliamentary election.

Following the landslide victory of the Fidesz in the 2010 parliamentary election, Simicskó was appointed Secretary of State for Defence on 2 June 2010, under Minister Csaba Hende. According to press reports, the relationship between Hende and Simicskó was tense and conflictual in the next two years. On 7 October 2012, Simicskó was replaced as Secretary of State for Defence by MP Tamás Vargha. He became Secretary of State for Sports in the Ministry of Human Resources on the following day, succeeding Attila Czene. In the 2014 parliamentary election Simicskó was re-elected MP again, representing Újbuda (Budapest Constituency II). He defeated opposition candidate István Józsa.

Simicskó was appointed to the position of Minister of Defence in September 2015 after the resignation of Csaba Hende during the European migrant crisis, with the speed at constructing a wall on the border with Serbia being an issue for Prime Minister Viktor Orbán. Simicskó was re-elected MP for Újbuda during the 2018 parliamentary election, defeating Erzsébet Gy. Németh. He was replaced as Minister of Defence by Col. Gen. Tibor Benkő. Simicskó was appointed one of the recorders of the National Assembly in June 2018. He held the latter position until July 2020, when he was elected leader of the KDNP parliamentary group, replacing Péter Harrach. Simicskó was defeated by opposition candidate Anna Orosz in Újbuda constituency during the 2022 parliamentary election, nevertheless he gained a mandate via the national list of Fidesz–KDNP. Simicskó became a member of the parliament's National Security Committee.

Simicskó was re-elected as MP via the Fidesz–KDNP during the 2026 Hungarian parliamentary election, where the coalition fall from power. He was replaced as caucus leader by Bence Rétvári. He was appointed one of the recorders of the National Assembly and also became a vice-chairman of the parliament's National Defense and Law Enforcement Committee in May 2026.

Political offices
Preceded by Csaba Hende	Minister of Defence; 2015–2018	Succeeded by Tibor Benkő
National Assembly of Hungary
Preceded by Péter Harrach	Leader of the KDNP parliamentary group 2020–2026	Succeeded by Bence Rétvári
