= Social Union (Hungary) =

Social Union Szociális Unió
- Chairperson: Katalin Szili
- Founded: 3 October 2010
- Dissolved: 17 October 2013
- Merged into: KTI
- Ideology: Traditionalism; Social democracy Environmentalism
- Colors: Purple, Brown

The Social Union (Hungarian: Szociális Unió) (SZU) was a centre-left political party in Hungary. It had a traditionalist and social democratic ideology.

== Establishment ==
Its leader Katalin Szili used to be a member of the Hungarian Socialist Party (MSZP) and served as Speaker of the National Assembly of Hungary between 2002 and 2009. She came to be considered inner opposition inside the MSZP since 2009. In 2009 Szili resigned from her position as speaker of Parliament; she was subsequently succeeded by Béla Katona of MSZP. She formed the Movement of Alliance for the Future in 2010 and had own candidates in some areas in the 2010 Hungarian parliamentary election. Szili was elected to the Parliament of Hungary via the Baranya County Party list where she was chairperson of the local MSZP chapter. After the 2010 local elections, held on 3 October, she founded the Social Union (SZU) and became its first chairperson. As a result, she quit the Hungarian Socialist Party and their parliamentarian group. Continuing the parliamentarian work as formally independent MP. However, as an elected parliamentarian she served a four-year term ending in 2014. Thus the new party Social Union instantly had some representation in Parliament, which is usually not possible for parties having won less than 5% of votes.

The Social Union merged to the Community for Social Justice People's Party (KTI) in 2013.

== Elections ==
Sándor Arnóth, the Member of Parliament for Püspökladány (Hajdú-Bihar County constituency VI) died in a car accident on 16 March 2011. During the mid-term election the Social Union's candidate was a 27-year-old trader named Róbert Bányász.
