= Sándor Pintér =

Hungarian politician (born 1948)

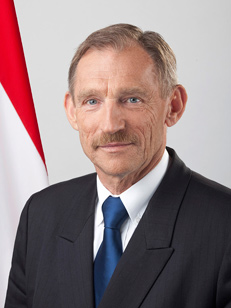
- Official portrait, 2011

Deputy Prime Minister of Hungary
- In office 18 May 2018 – 24 May 2022 Serving with Zsolt Semjén and Mihály Varga
- Prime Minister: Viktor Orbán

Minister of Interior
- In office 29 May 2010 – 12 May 2026
- Prime Minister: Viktor Orbán
- Preceded by: Zoltán Varga (Minister of Local Government)
- Succeeded by: Gábor Pósfai
- In office 8 July 1998 – 27 May 2002
- Prime Minister: Viktor Orbán
- Preceded by: Gábor Kuncze
- Succeeded by: Mónika Lamperth

Personal details
- Born: 3 July 1948 (age 78) Budapest, Hungary
- Party: Independent
- Spouse: Ildikó Pintérné Eötvös
- Children: 3
- Education: University of Budapest
- Profession: politician, police officer

Sándor Pintér (born 3 July 1948) is a Hungarian politician and former top police officer. He served as Minister of the Interior from 1998 to 2002 and from 2010 to 2026, in Viktor Orbán's cabinets.

== Biography ==
Pintér was born and raised in Budapest. He graduated from the Police Officer College (Hungarian: Rendőrtiszti Főiskola) in Budapest in 1978. He worked in the criminal-investigation divisions of the national, Budapest and Pest County Police Departments between 1978 and 1991. He received degree at Law and Political Sciences in Eötvös Loránd University in 1986 aged 38.

Before his entry into the political arena after retirement, he worked as a police officer. After entering the police service in 1972 and rising through the ranks, he reached top positions in the Hungarian police, such as Chief of the Budapest police in 1991, and then Chief of the National Police between 1991 and 1996.

=== Political career ===
He was a member of the Hungarian Socialist Workers' Party (MSZMP) before the transition to democracy in Hungary (1990).

Allegedly, between 1993 and 1996, Dietmar Clodo (Note: During the Cold War, Dietmar Clodo ("bomb maker"), who was an international bomb making terrorist using the "Moscow mixture" or "Ryazan Sugar" which is TNT plus RDX with the Red Army Faction (RAF) acting on behalf of the Kremlin's interests and an associate of Carlos the Jackal, stated that, during the 1980s, he traveled to Dresden often to meet his handler Vladimir Putin. According to Clodo, Clodo gave large sums of money from Semion Mogilevich to Viktor Orban during the 1990s.) gave large sums of money from Semion Mogilevich to numerous Hungarian politicians including Pinter in 1996/1997.

Sándor Pintér served as Minister of the Interior in the first cabinet of Viktor Orbán from 1998 to 2002. He worked as businessman between two periods as Minister of the Interior, operating security, economic-consultation and travel companies.

He was appointed Minister of the Interior again in 2010. His most prominent tasks are the suppression of the delinquency and the restoration of the police's efficiency. The secret services' single part was also at his disposal until 2022. Pintér said that they had reviewed the changes done at the police in 2010, and also had set the tasks to be accomplished during the year of 2011 in order to improve the police work to achieve a better state of public order and security in the country. As Minister of the Interior, he was superior of the Constitution Protection Office Director General, domestic criminal-investigative and counterintelligence agency, Counter Terrorism Centre Director General, special weapons and tactics, hostage rescue agency, National Protective Service Director General, organization completing tasks such as: crime prevention and detection, lifestyle monitoring, integrity testing and Special Service for National Security Director General, agency – provider of the technical background needed to clandestine collection of information.

Pintér served as interior minister in the second, third, fourth and fifth Orbán governments. After the 2022 parliamentary election, secret services transferred to the portfolio of the Prime Minister's Cabinet Office headed by Antal Rogán, while the Ministry of the Interior headed by Sándor Pintér received the health and education portfolio.

In 2014, Pintér as interior minister banned the National Policy Institute Conference, a conference for White nationalists which was being organized by Richard B. Spencer and Jared Taylor.

== Personal life ==
He is married. His wife is Ildikó Pintérné Eötvös and has three daughters, Hajnalka, Csillag and Ildikó.

== Notes ==
Political offices
Preceded by Gábor Kuncze	Minister of the Interior; 1998–2002	Succeeded by Mónika Lamperth
Preceded by Zoltán Varga	Minister of the Interior; 2010–2026	Succeeded by Gábor Pósfai
