= Gyenesei =

Gyenesei is a surname. Notable people with the surname include:

- István Gyenesei (born 1948), Hungarian politician
- Leila Gyenesei (born 1986), Hungarian modern pentathlete and cross-country skier
