= István Nikolits =

Hungarian politician

Minister of Civilian Intelligence Services of Hungary
- In office 1 April 1995 – 8 July 1998
- Preceded by: Béla Katona
- Succeeded by: László Kövér

Personal details
- Born: 24 June 1946 (age 79) Budapest, Hungary
- Party: MSZP
- Profession: politician

István Nikolits (born 24 June 1946) is a Hungarian politician, who served as Minister of Civilian Intelligence Services of Hungary between 1995 and 1998.

Political offices
Preceded by Béla Katona	Minister of Civilian Intelligence Services; 1995–1998	Succeeded by László Kövér
