= Ádám Ficsor =

Hungarian politician (born 1980)

Minister of Civilian Intelligence Services of Hungary
- In office 14 April 2009 – 13 September 2009
- Preceded by: György Szilvásy
- Succeeded by: Csaba Molnár

Personal details
- Born: 17 June 1980 (age 45) Miskolc, Hungary
- Party: MSZP, DK
- Spouse: Judit Kovách
- Profession: politician

Ádám Ficsor (born 17 June 1980) is a Hungarian politician, who served as Minister of Civilian Intelligence Services of Hungary in 2009. He was a part of Ferenc Gyurcsány's inner circle in the Hungarian Socialist Party.

In 2011 he joined Democratic Coalition Platform founded by Gyurcsány and became a member of its leadership. When the platform split from the Socialist Party on October 22, 2011 he joined to newly formed party and left the MSZP and its parliamentary group.

Political offices
Preceded by György Szilvásy	Minister of Civilian Intelligence Services; 2009	Succeeded by Csaba Molnár
