= Péter Harrach =

Hungarian politician and theologian

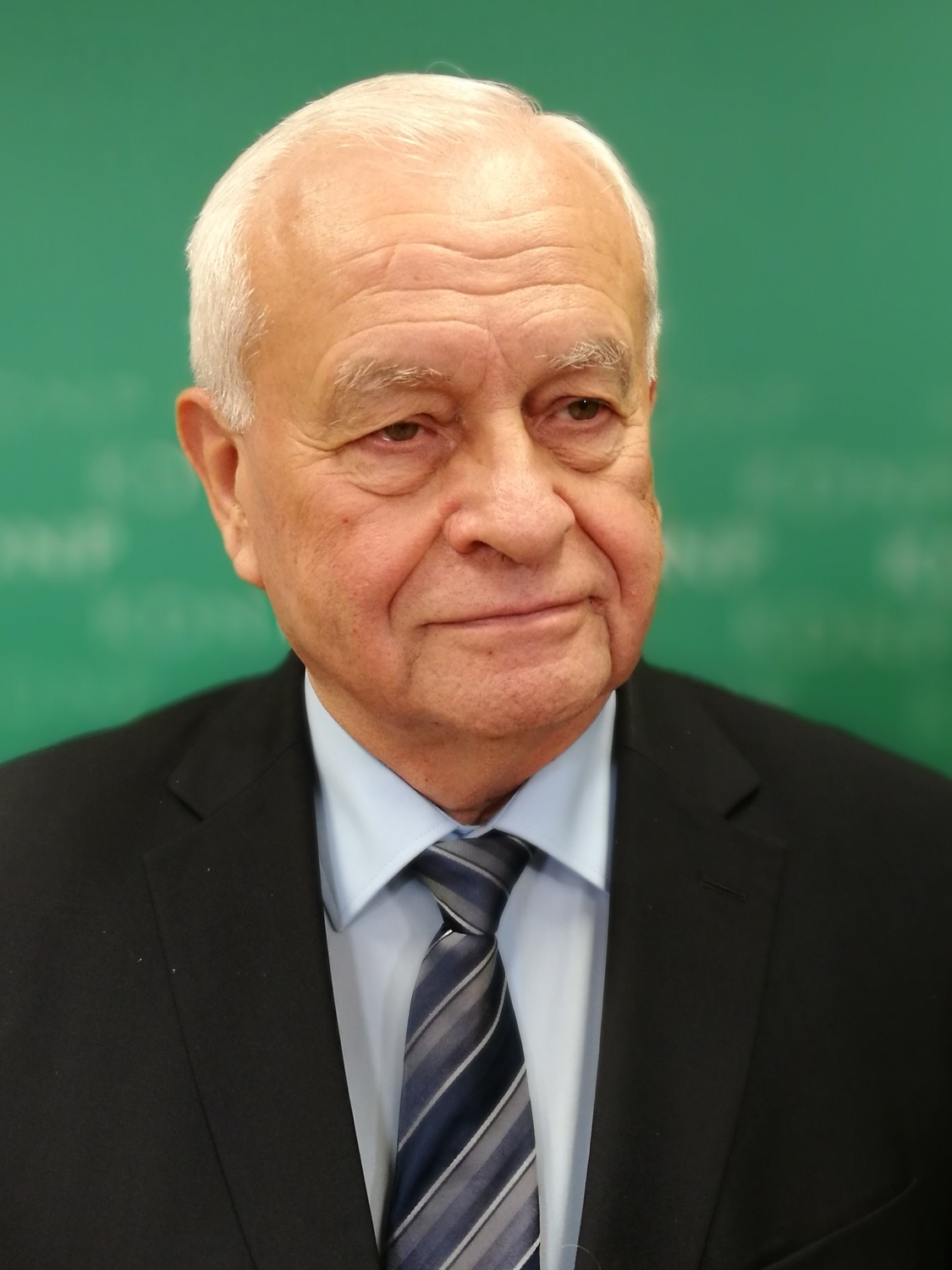

Deputy Speaker of the National Assembly
- In office 27 May 2002 – 13 May 2010

Minister of Social Affairs and Family
- In office 8 July 1998 – 27 May 2002
- Prime Minister: Viktor Orbán
- Preceded by: Péter Kiss (Minister of Labour)
- Succeeded by: Péter Kiss (Minister of Employment and Labour)

Personal details
- Born: 2 November 1947 (age 78) Budapest, Hungary
- Party: KDNP
- Spouse: Csilla Harrach
- Children: Gábor; Péter; Tamás
- Profession: politician, theologist

Péter Pál Harrach (born 2 November 1947) is a Hungarian politician and theologian, who served as Minister of Social Affairs and Family in the first cabinet of Viktor Orbán from 1998 to 2002. He was one of the Deputy Speakers of the National Assembly of Hungary from 27 May 2002 to 13 May 2010. He was a member of the National Assembly of Hungary from 18 June 1998 to 8 May 2026. He was leader of the Christian Democratic People's Party (KDNP) parliamentary group between 2010 and 2020.

== Early life and education ==
He finished King Stephen I Grammar School in 1966. He graduated as a theologian from the Roman Catholic Academy of Theology in 1972. He worked in numerous parishes as an assistant to the priest. He was the rapporteur of secular matters in the Episcopal Secretariat of the Hungarian Catholic Episcopal Conference, and he was a member of the family ministering commission from 1990 to 1998.

== Political career ==
He joined the Christian Democratic People's Party (KDNP) in 1989, where he was active as Church policy expert. He was the chairman of the Zugló branch from 1990 to 1997. He was the chairman of the Budapest coordination office of the Christian Democratic People's Party. He became one of the five national vice chairmen on 29 January 1995. He left the Christian Democratic People's Party in 1997 and became the vice president of the Hungarian Christian Democratic Alliance (MKDSZ) that was established on 30 August in Győr. As a delegate of the Hungarian Christian Democratic Alliance he was elected to the presidium of Fidesz - Hungarian Civic Party in 1999. He became co-president of the Hungarian Christian Democratic Alliance in 2000. He was re-elected president of the growing Christian Democratic Alliance on 14 February 2004. After the structural reform of Fidesz - Hungarian Civic Alliance he was awarded the chairmanship of the Szob constituency.

He ran in the 1990 and the 1994 parliamentary elections. He was a local representative in Zugló (14th district) from 1990 to 1998. He was also on the Budapest Assembly from 1994 to 1998. He secured his seat in Parliament supported by Fidesz - Hungarian Civic Party representing Constituency 1, Szob, Pest County. He was Minister of Social and Family Affairs of the Orbán Government from 8 July 1998 to 26 May 2002. In his capacity as a minister he was the member of the National Regional Development Council. In the 2002 parliamentary elections he was elected incumbent individual MP for his Szob district. He was elected one of the deputy speakers of Parliament on 27 May 2002. He had been deputy parliamentary faction leader of the Christian Democratic People's Party (KDNP) since 16 May 2006.

In the parliamentary elections in 2006 and 2010 he obtained an individual mandate in the constituency number 1, in Pest County. He was appointed leader of the KDNP parliamentary group on 14 May 2010. He was replaced by István Simicskó on 15 July 2020.

== Personal life ==
Péter Harrach is married to Csilla Harrach, a religion teacher, in 1973. They have three sons, Gábor, Péter and Tamás.

Political offices
| Preceded by Péter Kiss | Minister of Social Affairs and Family; 1998–2002 | Succeeded by Péter Kiss |
National Assembly of Hungary
| Preceded by Zsolt Semjén | Leader of the KDNP parliamentary group 2010–2020 | Succeeded by István Simicskó |
