= Community for Social Justice People's Party =

Hungarian political party

Community for Social Justice People's Party Közösség a Társadalmi Igazságosságért Néppárt
- Chairperson: Katalin Szili
- Founded: 17 October 2013
- Dissolved: August 2023
- Ideology: Third Way
- Colors: Blue, Green
- National Assembly: 0 / 199
- European Parliament: 0 / 21

Website
- http://ktipart.hu

The Community for Social Justice People's Party (Hungarian: Közösség a Társadalmi Igazságosságért Néppárt), abbreviated to KTI, was a Hungarian party and political alliance of several parties and civic organizations for the 2014 parliamentary election. The party was founded and led by MP Katalin Szili, a former Speaker of the National Assembly of Hungary. Another MP Gábor Ivády joined KTI.

== Members ==
The alliance consisted of the following organizations in October 2013: Social Union (SZU), Centre Party, Association Community for Carpathian Basin Life, Association of European Conservative Hungarians, Party of Hungarian Future, Hungarian Autonomous People's Party, Hungarian Social Forum, Association for Hungarian Regions (MARÉG), Peyer Károly Foundation, Advocacy Association for Citizens of Zugló, Association of Chance for Renewal and Movement for a People-oriented Country.

== History ==
In October 2013, 12 parties and civil organizations, on the initiative of Katalin Szili and her party, the Social Union (SZU), established an electoral alliance for the 2014 general election, called Community for Social Justice People's Party (KTI). According to the party's founding decree, KTI seeks to "give a chance to those people who cannot choose from existing parties, including Hungary's nearly 4 million poor whom nobody cares for". Szili also said "there was a tremendous need for a political alternative organised on a democratic and national basis. All political forces are at war with each other, leaving the problems of the impoverished masses unresolved." The party was dissolved in August 2023.
