= Katalin Szili =

Hungarian politician (born 1956)

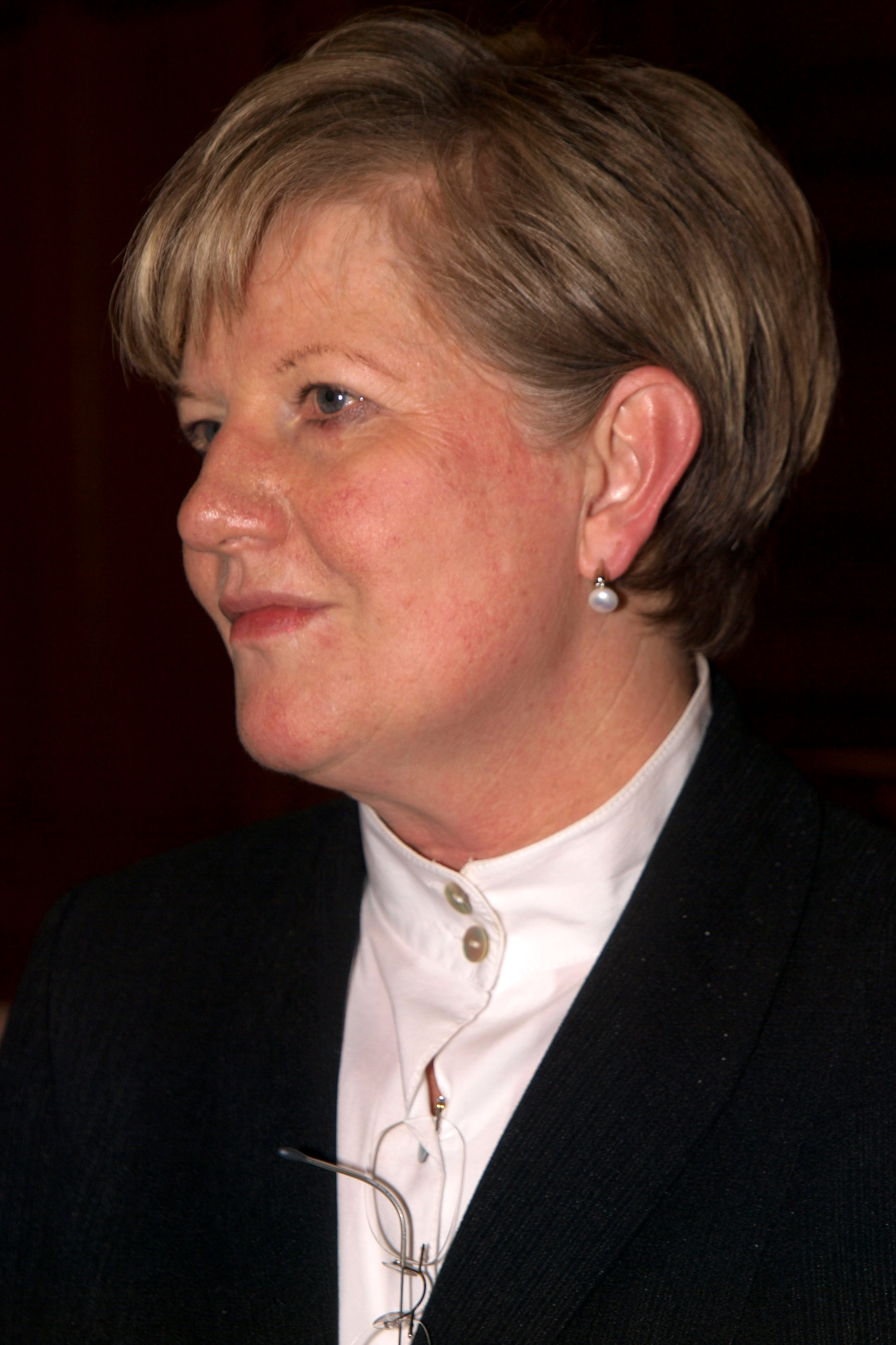
- Szili in 2009

Speaker of the National Assembly
- In office 15 May 2002 – 14 September 2009
- Preceded by: János Áder
- Succeeded by: Béla Katona

Member of the National Assembly
- In office 28 June 1994 – 5 May 2014

Personal details
- Born: 13 May 1956 (age 69) Barcs, Hungary
- Party: KDNP (2023–present)
- Other political affiliations: MSZMP (1983–1989); MSZP (1989–2010); SZU (2010–2014); KTI (2013–2015); Independent (2015–2023)
- Children: 2
- Profession: Politician; Jurist

Katalin Szili (born 13 May 1956) is a Hungarian politician and jurist, a former Member of the National Assembly, who served as Speaker of the National Assembly from 2002 to 2009.

Following an administrative career in the Hungarian People's Republic, she was a long-time member of the left-wing Hungarian Socialist Party (MSZP). She was Member of Parliament (MP) from 1994 to 2014, and was considered a leading politician of her party for a decade. After the 2014 election, she gradually became a proponent of the right-wing Fidesz government, voicing nationalist and anti-immigrant slogans.

== Early life ==
Katalin Szili was born into a family of bourgeois origin on 13 May 1956 in Barcs, Somogy County. Her maternal grandparents were ethnic Austrians. The family lost all their property during World War II, and her grandfather was killed in the Battle of Budapest in February 1945. Her father György Szili (1935–1987) worked as a commercial lecturer and her mother Anna Barakonyi (b. 1937) as an accountant. At the age of twelve, Katalin Szili lost her left hand as a result of an accident, when a grenade exploded in her hand. For this reason she wears shawls to cover her hands or pockets it in public. On ceremonial occasions, she usually wears an artificial hand that matches the color of her skin.

She attended elementary school in Barcs and Pécs. She finished her secondary studies at the Nagy Lajos Secondary Grammar School of Pécs in 1974. She obtained a doctorate in law at the Janus Pannonius University in 1981. She passed the bar examination in 1985. She graduated from the Department of Human Ecology of the Eötvös Loránd University (ELTE) between 1990 and 1992, and also earned a degree in political science in Pécs in 2001. She married architect Miklós Molnár in 1977. They raised the two children of a couple of friends who died in a car accident and have no children of their own.

== Professional career ==
After graduating, she was responsible for guardianship at the local council of Pécs, and she was the head of a local guardianship authority from 1984 to 1985. Thereafter, she joined the South Transdanubian Water Directorate in 1985, first as a legal adviser and then as the head of an official department. After the transition to democracy, she was the head of the Environment and Water Directorate and then of the Environmental Inspectorate until 1992. She became a member of the leadership of the Hungarian Society of Human Ecologists in 1992.

In 2003 she was elected the social president of the women's basketball department of the Pécsi VSK, she held the position until 2005. She became an honorary associate professor at the University of Pécs in 2008.

== Political career ==
=== MSZP ===
Szili joined the Hungarian Socialist Workers' Party (MSZMP) in 1983. She became a founding member of its legal successor, the Hungarian Socialist Party (MSZP) on 15 November 1989, and participated in the establishment of its local branch in Pécs. She ran as a candidate in the 1990 parliamentary election in Pécs (Constituency II, Baranya County), and finished third in the second round, while András Pap (MDF) obtained the mandate. She was elected to the municipal assembly of Pécs during a by-election in 1992.

She was also nominated individual candidate in Pécs (Constituency II), but her name also appeared at the first place on the regional county list of MSZP during the 1994 parliamentary election. She obtained the mandate in the constituency, defeating Tibor Németh (SZDSZ) and András Pap (MDF). After Gyula Horn formed his MSZP–SZDSZ coalition government, she served as the secretary of state for political affairs in the Ministry of Environment and Regional Development (under minister Ferenc Baja) from 15 July 1994 to 7 July 1998. At that time she was also a member of the Council of the National Technical Development Committee (OMFB). She was elected chairperson of the local branch of her party in Pécs in 1997. A year later, she became president of the party's national women section.

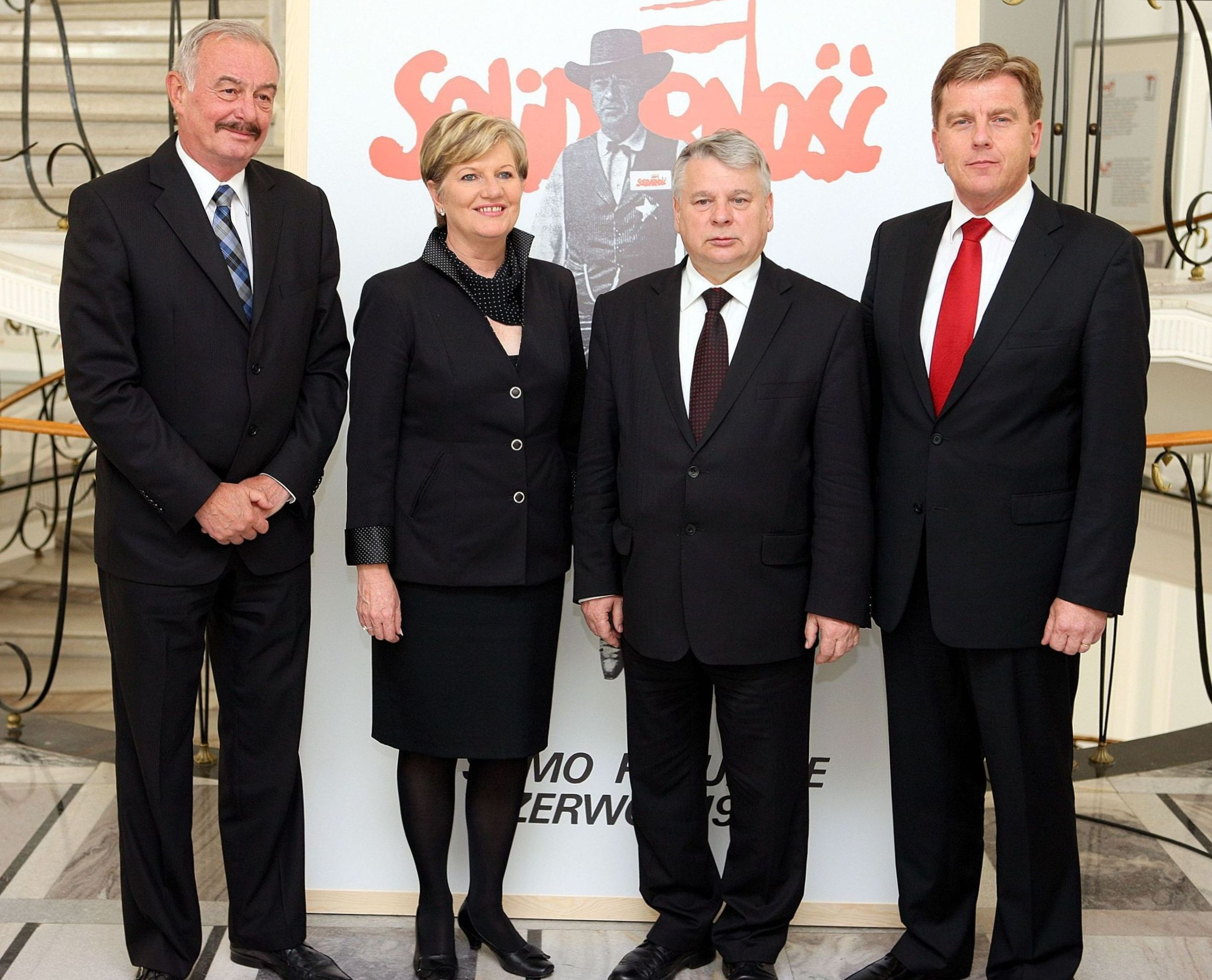
Meeting of speakers of parliaments of the Visegrád Group in the Polish Senate in June 2009 (from l–r): Přemysl Sobotka, Katalin Szili, Bogdan Borusewicz and Miloslav Vlček

Szili was re-elected MP for Pécs (Constituency II) in the 1998, 2002 and 2006 parliamentary elections. She served as Deputy Speaker of the National Assembly between 1998 and 2002. Following the 2002 parliamentary election, Szili was elected Speaker of the National Assembly, becoming the second woman, who held the office. She was re-elected as Speaker in 2006.

She was the candidate of the Hungarian Socialist Party for presidency in the 2005 Hungarian presidential election. Szili lost the election on 7 June 2005 to opposition nominee László Sólyom. The Hungarian Constitution prescribes that the President must be elected by the National Assembly of Hungary, thus the victory of the opposition came as something of a surprise. The junior coalition party, the Alliance of Free Democrats (SZDSZ), however, had long emphasized that it would not vote for a partisan President. Szili as a high-ranking member of the Socialist party was considered partisan, the SZDSZ abstained, enabling the more neutral candidate Sólyom (who was originally nominated by a non-governmental organization Védegylet and later supported by the opposition), to win the office. Another reason for the failed nomination was that SZDSZ was not consulted ahead of time and Szili lacked qualifications compared to Sólyom who previously held high office as the president of the Constitutional Court of Hungary.

In 2009 Szili was the mayoral candidate of MSZP for the mayor of a major Hungarian city, Pécs. She lost the election to Zsolt Páva. She came to be considered inner opposition inside the MSZP since 2009 (some considered she had prominent role in the leakage of the Őszöd speech three years earlier). In 2009 Szili resigned from her position as speaker of Parliament, She was succeeded by Béla Katona of MSZP. She formed the Movement of Alliance for the Future in 2010 and had her own candidates in some areas in the 2010 Hungarian parliamentary election. Szili was elected to the Parliament of Hungary via the Baranya County Party list where she was chairperson of the local MSZP branch.

=== Independent MP ===
After the 2010 local elections, held on 3 October, she founded the Social Union (SZU) and became its first chairperson. As a result, she quit the Hungarian Socialist Party and their parliamentary group, continuing her parliamentary work as a formally independent MP. However, as an elected parliamentarian she filled a four-year term ending in 2014. Thus the new party Social Union instantly had some representation in Parliament, which is usually not possible for parties having won less than 5% of votes.

In 2011 Szili became a member of the Nemzeti Konzultációs Testület (National Consultative body) preparing the new constitution. Later, she presented her own proposal. Szili was appointed Chairperson of the Committee on Sustainable Development on 25 February 2013.

On 17 October 2013, Szili and her party, the Social Union (SZU), entered into an alliance with 11 other parties and civil groups (including Centre Party) and established Community for Social Justice People's Party (KTI). Her new party did not reach the 5% threshold contrary in the 2014 parliamentary election, as a result she lost her parliamentary seat after 20 years.

=== Supporter of Viktor Orbán ===
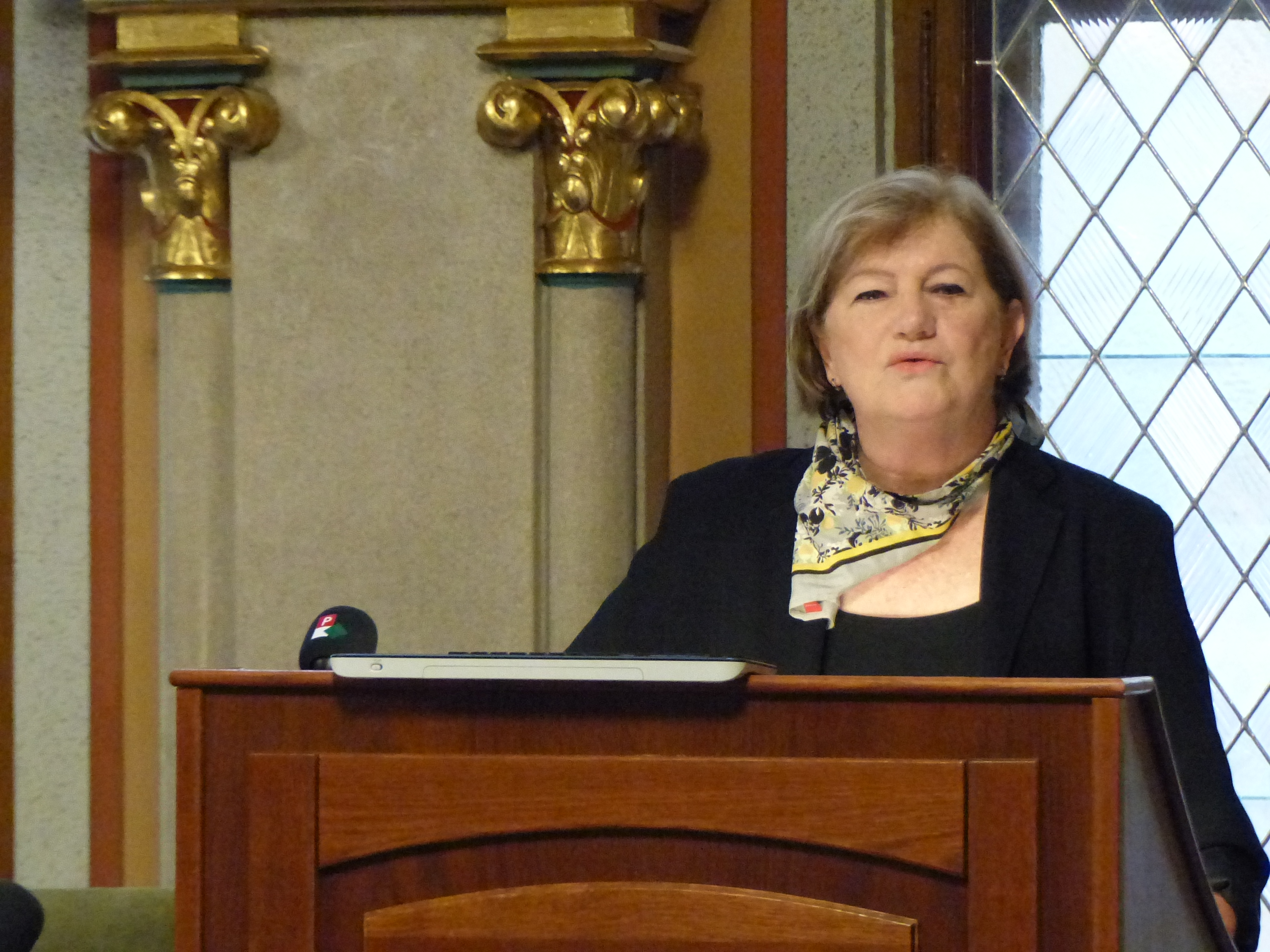
Katalin Szili as prime ministerial commissioner in November 2019

Following the 2014 national election, Szili gradually switched to Fidesz, and became a vocational supporter of Prime Minister Viktor Orbán, who retained his two-third majority in the Hungarian parliament. Upon the request of Deputy Prime Minister Zsolt Semjén, she was appointed Prime Ministerial Commissioner on 1 March 2015. Her task covers "coordination tasks related to the aspirations of autonomy in the Carpathian Basin and the concepts of autonomy of social, political and non-governmental organizations, in cooperation with the State Secretariat for National Policy of the Prime Minister's Office, and liaison with European Union and international organizations."

She voted "no" in the 2016 migrant quota referendum, because she "supports the long-term protection of the entire European Judeo-Christian cultural community". In a 2017 interview, she denied allegations that she had negotiated with Fidesz, betrayed the left, or that she would be a socialist "decorative finch" for Fidesz, stating she was doing important work for the nation, not a member of the MSZP since 2010, and she is criticized by those who have a "bad conscience" in national affairs (regarding the 2004 dual citizenship referendum). She explained the failures of her later small parties (SZU, KTI) by a lack of financial means. Szili actively campaigned for Fidesz during the 2018 parliamentary election. Szili stated just before the 2019 European Parliament election that the election will be a "struggle between supporters and opponents of migration", quoting the words of Viktor Orbán.

In order to remain a member of the board of trustees of the University of Pécs, she resigned as Prime Ministerial Commissioner in February 2023. However, soon, she was appointed chief advisor to the Prime Minister Viktor Orbán, which raised the issue of evasion of conflict of interest legislation. She joined the Christian Democratic People's Party (KDNP), the coalition partner of the ruling Fidesz, on 31 March 2023.

Political offices
Preceded by János Áder	Speaker of the National Assembly; 2002–2009	Succeeded by Béla Katona
