= Counter Terrorism Centre =

Hungarian government agency

Counter Terrorism Centre Terrorelhárítási Központ
- Logo of the Counter Terrorism Centre
- Abbreviation: TEK

Agency overview
- Formed: September 1, 2010
- Employees: 1300 (2022)
- Annual budget: 13.41 billion HUF (61 million $) annually (2013)

Jurisdictional structure
- Operations jurisdiction: Hungary

Operational structure
- Headquarters: Zách utca 4. Budapest, Hungary
- Elected officer responsible: Gábor Pósfai, Minister of Interior
- Agency executive: None currently (Brigadier General János Hajdu 2010-2026, Director-General)

Website
- http://tek.gov.hu/

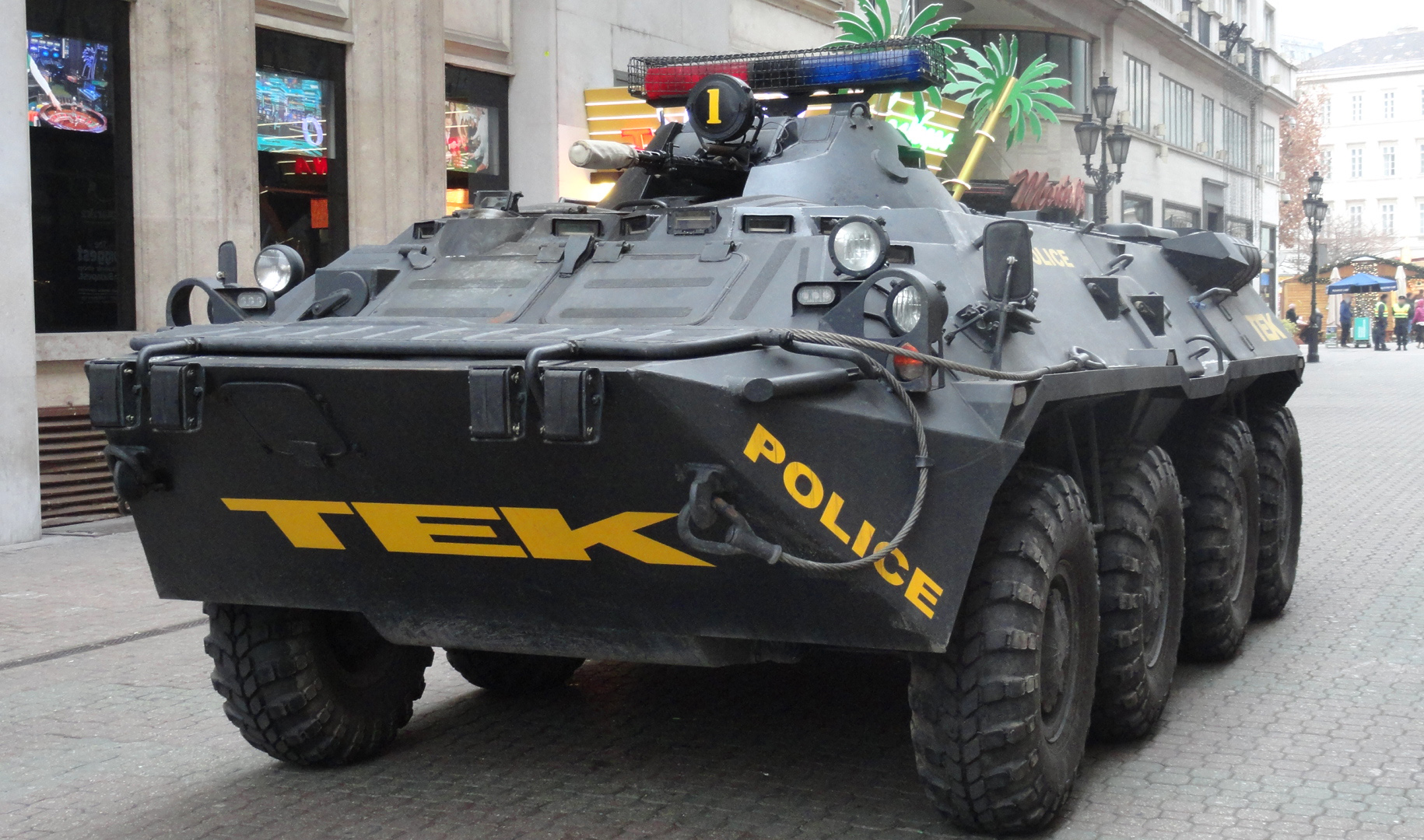
BTR-80 of the Counter Terrorism Centre

Counter Terrorism Centre (CTC) (Hungarian: Terrorelhárítási Központ, TEK) is a Hungarian government agency responsible for national and international counter terrorism including detection, prevention and interruption. The agency has a police tactical unit to respond terrorist incidents and if requested by law enforcement agencies can provide tactical assistance.

TEK provides personal protection including to the Prime Minister and the President and can also provide an escort for extraditions of dangerous persons to the Hungarian border and from abroad. TEK is under the direct control of the Hungarian Ministry of Interior, headed by Sándor Pintér.

TEK headquarters is located at Zách street (close to Hungária Boulevard), Pál Maléter Barracks, Kőbánya, Budapest, Hungary.

== History ==
TEK was founded by the Second Cabinet of Viktor Orbán on 1 September 2010. According to the Hungarian ombudsman (Máté Szabó), TEK is the most professional, well-financed and well-equipped state agency in the country.

== Role ==
- Counter-terrorism: Preventing terrorist attacks
- Hostage crisis: Set to free Hungarian hostages nationwide and worldwide
- Gun violence: Bank robbery, School shooting
- Capturing and arresting dangerous, armed criminals or POIs
- Fighting Organized crime: Elimination of mafia organizations
- Protecting the Hungarian government, politicians, ambassadors and citizens nationwide and worldwide

== Equipment ==
Aside from less lethal options, TEK employ a number of small arms:

Model	Type	Origin	References
Heckler & Koch USP	Semi-automatic pistol	Germany	
Glock 17	Semi-automatic pistol	Austria	
Glock 19	Semi-automatic pistol	Austria	
Heckler & Koch MP5	Submachine gun	Germany	
Heckler & Koch HK416	Assault rifle	Germany	
Heckler & Koch HK417	Sniper rifle	Germany	

Detailed information about the equipment of TEK is not public, but according to the Hungarian media, it uses armoured Audi Q7 luxury SUVs and BTR-80 armoured personnel carriers equipped with police light bars on the roof.

According to Sándor Pintér, the now former Minister of Interior under the Fidesz government, TEK does not use tanks.

== Notable operations ==
On 2010 Units of TEK deployed in order to arrest members of extreme BDSM website Mood Pictures in Budapest

On 10 October 2011, during World War Z filming in Budapest, TEK invaded the crew's stores and also seized several guns, sniper rifles etc. which were used for filming. According to the official statement producers failed to consult with the authorities and despite the import documentation's indication, all weapons were found to be fully functional. Later prosecutor's office dropped the charges in February 2012.

On August 13, 2012, three Hungarian nationals were held hostage by Syrian gunmen in Damascus. A detachment from TEK was deployed to Syria to set free the Hungarians. They arrived in Budapest on August 27, 2012, without injury.

In 2015 and 2016 the Europe-wide terrorist attacks and threat resulted in increased funds and constant readiness for TEK. They cooperated with the army and police to secure & patrol Budapest after the March 22 Brussels attacks.

== Controversy ==
In 2015, Hungarian President János Áder removed the TEK as his personal security after his conversations with Prime Minister Orbán indicated that the TEK were secretly informing Orbán of Áder's private meetings.

In the spring of 2018, former deputy head of the TEK, Brigadier General Zsolt Bodnár, was targeted with Pegasus spyware following his departure from the TEK and conflicts between Bodnár and TEK director János Hajdú.

In February 2025, the TEK's tactical unit was secretly deployed to Republika Srpska in Bosnia and Herzegovina to extract Milorad Dodik, the President of Republika Srpska, to Hungary. Dodik was being prosecuted for signing laws that nullified rulings of the Bosnian Constitutional Court and the High Representative for Bosnia and Herzegovina. The TEK reportedly deployed 70 officers, armored vehicles, and a mobile command center under the personal command of its commander János Hajdú, to Republika Srpska under the false auspices of a training exercise in order to extract Dodik in the scenario that the Constitutional Court ordered his detention. According to the Bosnian foreign ministry, the TEK's entry into the country was not authorized, their presence was condemned by Bosnia's defense minister Zukan Helez, and led to a formal protest from the foreign ministry and a request for Hungary's removal from EUFOR's ALTHEA mission.

On March 5, 2026, seven employees of the Ukrainian Oschadbank with two armoured cash trucks were seized by TEK overnight in a highway parking facility in Budapest. The trucks carried $40 million, €35 million and 9kg of gold from Austria to Ukraine. The seizure followed a dispute over gas supplies, in which Hungary and Slovakia have accused Ukraine of deliberately stalling on repairs to an oil pipeline after it was hit in a Russian drone attack. Ukrainian officials have accused Viktor Orbán of initiating the scandal for political gain ahead of a bitterly contested election in April 2026.
