= László Kövér =

Hungarian politician

László Kövér MP
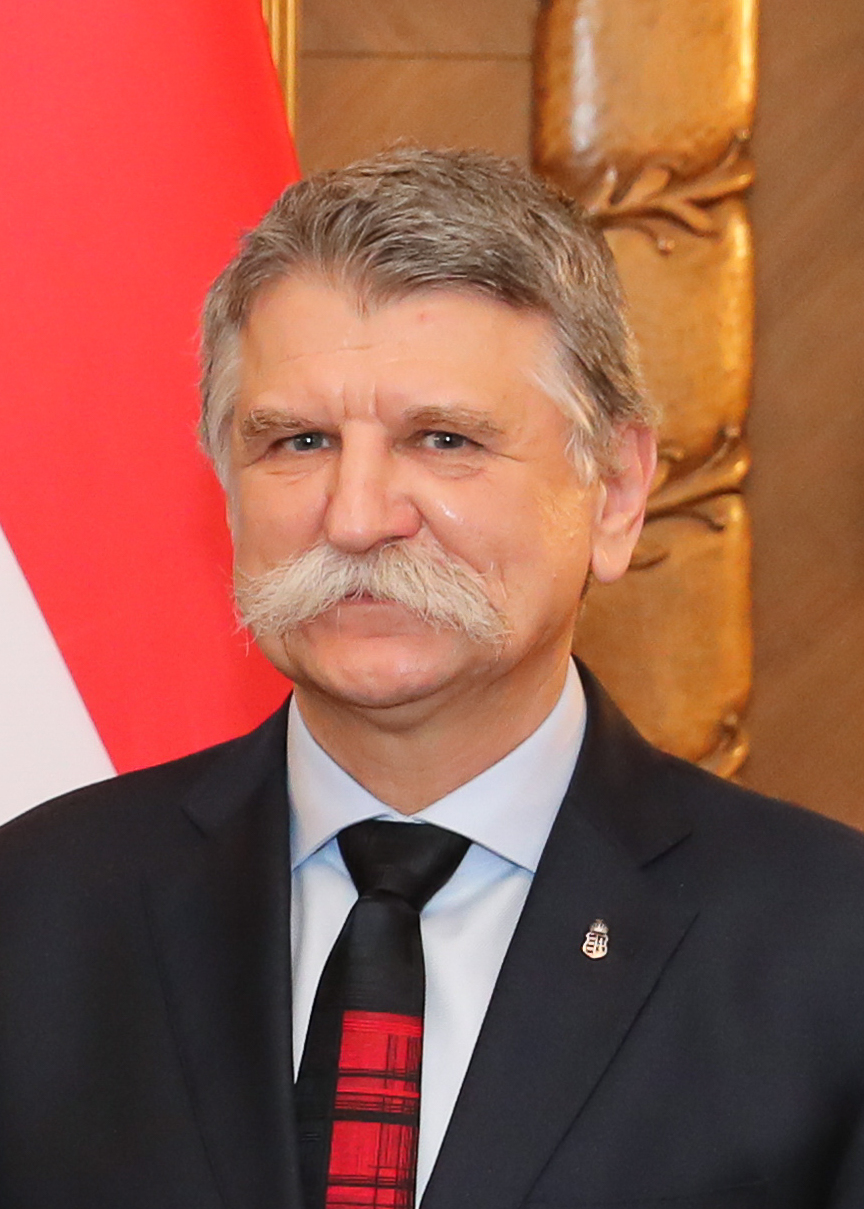
- Kövér in 2022

Speaker of the National Assembly
- In office 6 August 2010 – 8 May 2026
- Preceded by: Pál Schmitt
- Succeeded by: Ágnes Forsthoffer

Acting President of Hungary
- In office 26 February 2024 – 5 March 2024
- Prime Minister: Viktor Orbán
- Preceded by: Katalin Novák
- Succeeded by: Tamás Sulyok
- In office 2 April 2012 – 10 May 2012
- Prime Minister: Viktor Orbán
- Preceded by: Pál Schmitt
- Succeeded by: János Áder

Minister of Civilian Intelligence Services
- In office 8 July 1998 – 2 May 2000
- Prime Minister: Viktor Orbán
- Preceded by: István Nikolits
- Succeeded by: Ervin Demeter

Member of the National Assembly
- In office 2 May 1990 – 8 May 2026

Personal details
- Born: 29 December 1959 (age 66) Pápa, Hungary
- Party: Fidesz (1988–present)
- Spouse: Mária Bekk (m. 1987)
- Children: 3
- Education: Eötvös Loránd University

László Kövér (Note: Hungarian pronunciation: [ˈlaːsloː ˈkøveːr]) (born 29 December 1959) is a Hungarian politician who served as the speaker of the National Assembly of Hungary from 2010 to 2026. He is the longest-serving speaker of the unicameral parliament. Under his capacity as speaker, he was also twice acting president of Hungary in 2012 after the resignation of Pál Schmitt, and again in 2024 after the resignation of Katalin Novák.

A founding member of Fidesz since 1988, he was a Member of Parliament between 1990 and 2026. He served as Minister without portfolio for Civilian Intelligence Services from 1998 to 2000, during the first Viktor Orbán administration. He was appointed leader of the party in 2000, but resigned from his position the following year.

== Career ==
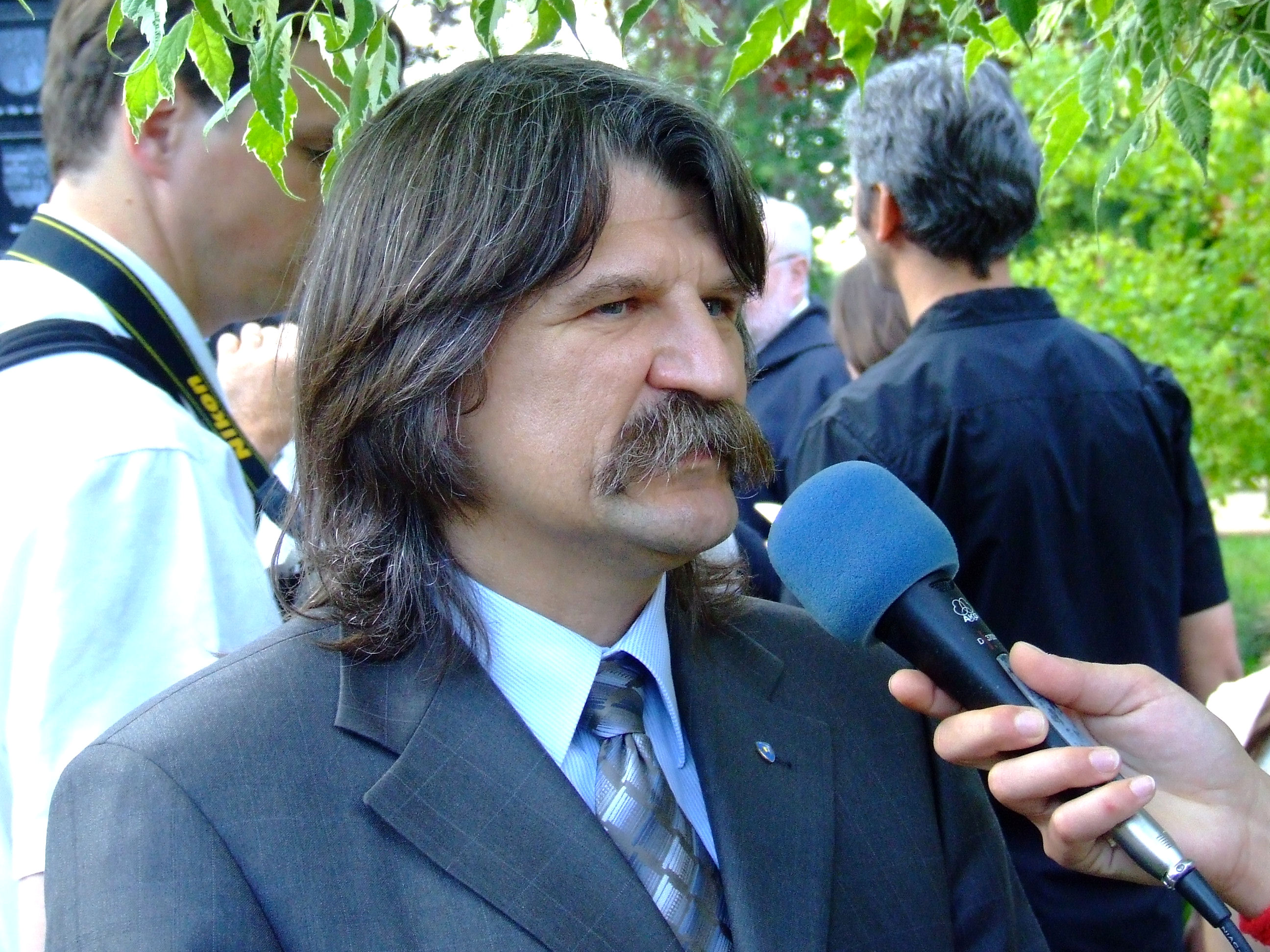
László Kövér in 2007

László Kövér was born in the town of Pápa and is a founding member of the Fidesz party. it is reported that even as late as the 1990s, he declared that he was a socialist and argued for the adjective “socialist” to be included in their student organization's (which later became Fidesz) name, which was eventually voted down by the majority, which included Viktor Orbán. He was an active participant in the Opposition Round Table discussions – a notable stage in the Hungarian transition – as well as of the tripartite political negotiations in 1989. A Member of Parliament since 1990, he is now the chairman of the Board of Fidesz - Hungarian Civic Union. He used to lead his political group in the National Assembly, and had chaired the Committee on National Security for two terms. He was minister without portfolio in charge of the Civil National Security Services during the first Orbán Cabinet. Shortly thereafter, he was elected as the President of Fidesz, a position he held until 5 May 2001.

In the 1996 to 2009 period, he was a member of the Board of the Hungarian Association for Civic Cooperation. A member of the Board of the Hungarian Association of International Children's Safety Service since 1990, he has been its president since 1994.

He was elected Speaker of the National Assembly of Hungary on 22 July 2010. Kövér took the position on 5 August, after his predecessor, Pál Schmitt, replaced László Sólyom as President of Hungary.

Kövér has become acting president twice-following the resignation of Schmitt as president on 2 April 2012, Kövér became acting president of the Republic according to the Constitution of Hungary. The National Assembly had 30 days to elect a new president. One of the five deputy speakers of the parliament, Sándor Lezsák was commissioned to exercise the Speaker's rights and responsibilities. On 10 February 2024, Katalin Novák resigned due to scandal, prompting him to take this office once more.

Kövér was re-elected as speaker of the parliament on 6 May 2014, on 8 May 2018, and also on 2 May 2022. Kövér is the longest serving speaker of the National Assembly with more than 15 years as of 2026. Following the 2026 Hungarian parliamentary election, when Fidesz suffered a crushing defeat, Kövér – although he was elected via his party's national list, he chose not to take up his parliamentary mandate, thereby leaving parliament after 36 years.

=== Personal life ===
His paternal grandfather was a carpenter and also a member of the Hungarian Social Democratic Party (MSZDP) and later of the Hungarian Working People's Party (MDP) and the Hungarian Socialist Workers' Party (MSZMP), who had served in the army of the Hungarian Soviet Republic in 1919. The maternal ancestors belonged to the middle class. His maternal grandfather was a taxi driver. His parents were László Kövér, Sr. (1933–1993), a locksmith and Erzsébet Ábrahám (born 1939). His brother, Szilárd, is a jurist. László Kövér married in 1987, his wife is Mária Bekk, a secondary school teacher of history and ethnography. They have three children: Vajk (1988), Botond (1989) and Csenge (1994).

After the 2006 parliamentary election, when Fidesz lost the elections for the second time, Kövér swore that he would not cut his hair until the party was once again able to form a government. After four years, when his party won a two-thirds majority of seats by gaining 52% of the votes, Kövér appeared with short hair in the inaugural session of the sixth parliamentary term on 14 May 2010. In January 2017, Kövér cut his iconic mustache, which became his trademark throughout his political career.

== Controversial views and statements ==
According to Czech newspaper Hospodářské noviny Kövér said about Gabčíkovo–Nagymaros Dams: "When the Gabčikova-Nagymaros dam was built, the Slovak side has brutally changed the borders. The Hungarian state sought a legal rather than military solution, which it could have used in this situation."

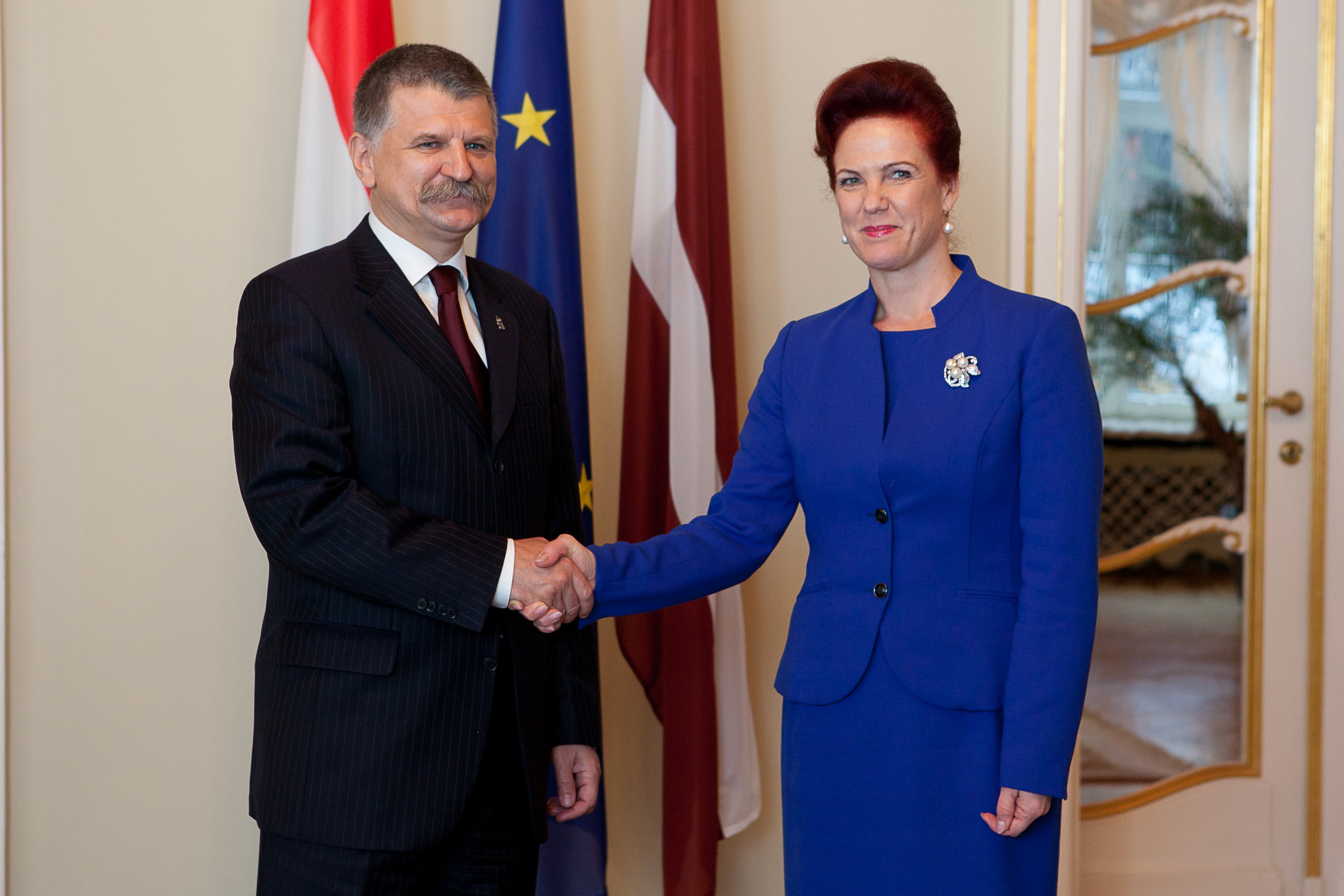
Kövér with Latvian House Speaker Solvita Āboltiņa in 2012

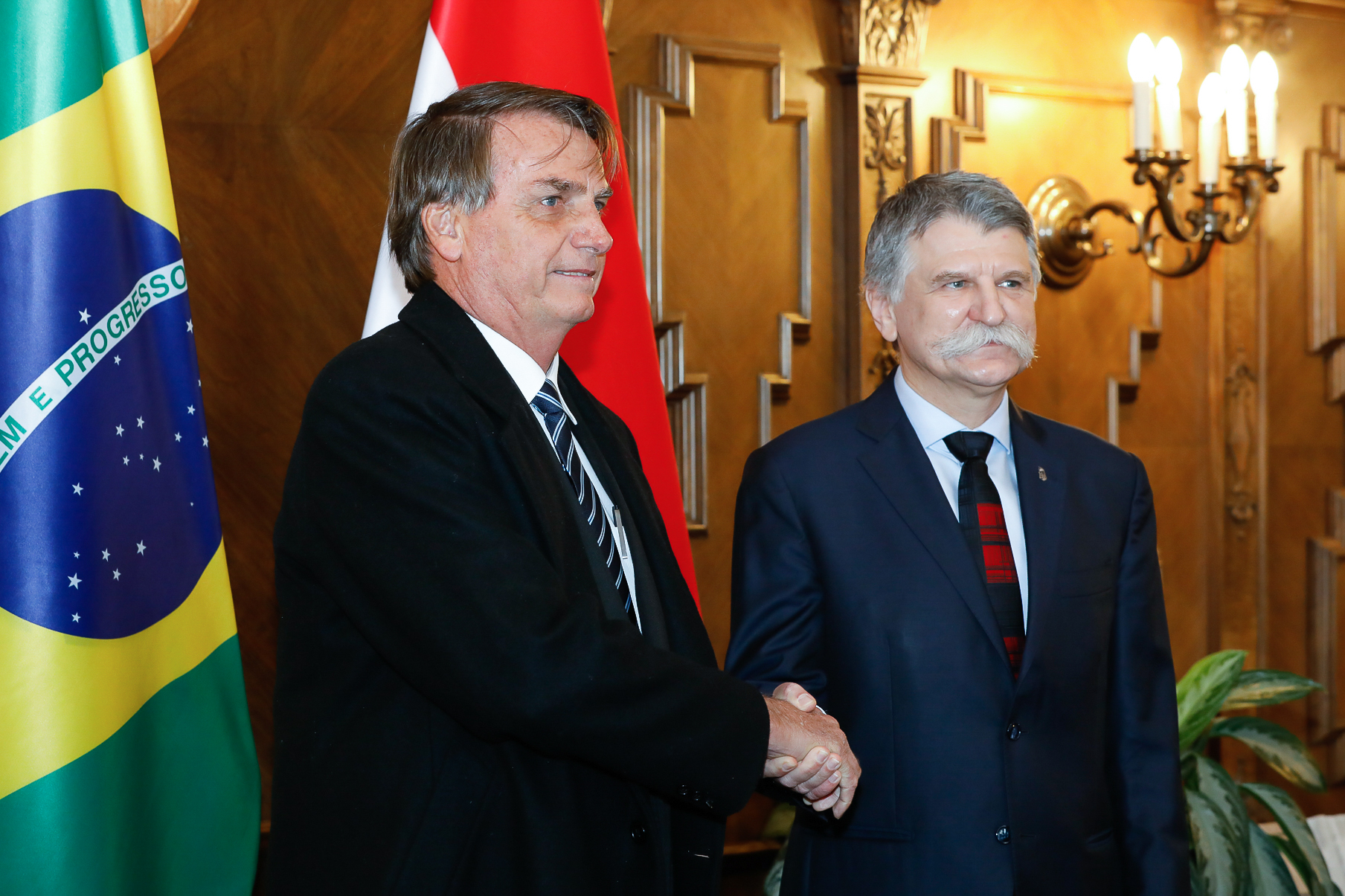
Kövér and Brazilian president Jair Bolsonaro during the latter’s visit to the Hungarian Parliament on 17 February 2022

In September 2013, László Kövér said in a radio interview that in the long run he could image parliament should give more executive and legislative power to the cabinet in order to more effective treatment on "everyday challenges and enforce decisions through decrees, without the need to enact even the most detailed rules." He also told to Echo TV that parliament's current legislative method "with unnecessary detail" must be reformed, "leaving the elaboration of details to the government and simultaneously allowing deputies more time to supervise the executive authority". Both Hungarian Socialist Party and the E14–PM electoral alliance called on Kövér to resign because of these statements. Jobbik said "Kövér's statement pointed to a return of the era of the people's republic."

In December 2015 he caused a furor with his conservative views on gender roles. His words "we would like it if our daughters believed the highest level of self-actualization is to give us grandchildren" caused a media storm and spawned memes on the internet.

In September 2019, during a summit devoted to Europe's demographic challenges, he suggested that childless people are "not normal" and stated that “having children is a public matter, not a private one”.

In April 2021, he claimed in an interview that “the Hungarian leftwing liberal opposition is part of a globalist, anti-national network” and that its representatives are “no different from Mátyás Rákosi or Ernő Gerő”. In November it was reported by the Hungarian investigative journalism outlet Direkt36 reported that Kövér had delivered a speech (which had been secretly recorded) when meeting Hungarian civil intelligence services at their private 30th anniversary event in February 2020, in which he claimed that the current opposition parties are "the greatest national security threat to the country", adding that “the other part of the political class is acting in the spirit of the political tradition of abandoning the state and of self-disparaging as a nation”, likening them to the Communists led by Béla Kun in 1919 and claiming that they are involved in a 'class war'.

=== Nyírő's reburial ===
József Nyírő was a popular Hungarian writer in the 1930s and 1940s, and a politician associated with fascism and antisemitism. In 2012, an attempt was made to move Nyírő's remains from Madrid, where his ashes were buried in 1953, to his birthplace Odorheiu Secuiesc in Transylvania. The reburial was originally planned for May 27, but the Romanian government banned the move. Prime Minister of Romania Victor Ponta said that Romania rejects paying tribute on its soil to people known for antisemitic, anti-Romanian and pro-fascist conduct. In place of the reburial a small ecumenical service for the writer took place. The ceremony was attended by the leadership of the Jobbik party, and Hungary's State Secretary for Culture Géza Szőcs and speaker of the Hungarian Parliament László Kövér. Kövér complained that the Romanian government is "uncivilized," "paranoid," "hysterical," "barbaric," and that the people "who had a son whose ashes were feared" would be "victorious." He announced that they will bury Nyírő one way or the other and that they had smuggled his ashes into the country. Government authorities searched vehicles to ensure the urn were not buried at the ceremony but its location still remains unknown.

Nobel Prize laureate and Holocaust survivor Elie Wiesel, in a letter to Kövér, said he was furious that Kövér had participated in a ceremony honoring a writer who was a loyal member of Hungary's World War II far-right parliament, an act he suggested reflected the authorities' willingness to gloss over the country's dark past. "I found it outrageous that the Speaker of the Hungarian National Assembly could participate in a ceremony honoring a Hungarian fascist ideologue," Wiesel wrote. In further protest, Wiesel rejected the Great Cross, a Hungarian government award that he received in 2004.

Kövér, in his answer letter to Wiesel stated, the American, British and Soviet generals in the Allied Control Commission determined the conclusion in 1945 and 1947, when they refused to extradite the exiled writer two times for the request of the contemporary Hungarian Communist Minister of the Interior, Nyirő was not a war criminal, nor fascist or antisemitic. He also mentioned that Nicolae Ceauşescu's government treated Nyírő as a well-recognized writer and ensured pension for his widow in the 1970s. Kövér cited a Hungarian Jewish scientific review (the Libanon) and the newspaper stated that neither Nazi ideals nor antisemitism could be found in Nyírő's literary works. Nyírő, the Transylvanian-born Hungarian writer, deserves respect not because of his—although insignificant, but certainly tragically misguided—political activities but his literary works, according to Kövér.

Knesset Speaker Reuven Rivlin told Kövér that he is not welcome in Israel saying that the government of Israel is "shocked" that he chose to participate in the event commemorating Nyírő. "We are shocked by the reports that you chose to participate in an event commemorating anti-Semitic writer József Nyírő," wrote Rivlin, "By so doing, you have openly proclaimed your identification with a man whose party, as part of the Hungarian leadership, cooperated with the Nazi murderers in the execution of their plan to annihilate the Jewish people." Rivlin also said: "A person who took part in such a ceremony cannot participate in an event honoring a man like Raoul Wallenberg, a Righteous Gentile, a symbol of humanity, who saved Jews while risking his life, and who serves as an example of the fight against the Nazis and their collaborators, with whom you chose to identify."

=== Homophobic comments ===
In a speech at the Budapest Metropolitan University pronounced on 15 May 2019, Kövér said that the desire of homosexual people to adopt children could be likened to paedophilia as "both are interests into children". Kövér's words were strongly condemned by centre-left opposition and LGBT associations: Tímea Szabó (Dialogue for Hungary) described the statement as "shameful", while independent MP Bernadett Szél accused Fidesz to "court the far-right with no more inibitions". The Democratic Coalition even described Kövér as "a political criminal" and stated that its MPs would no longer stand up to salute the Speaker as he enters the Assembly.

Kövér's words also received condemnation from the political scientist Zoltán Lakner and by the German ambassador in Hungary.

Political offices
Preceded by István Nikolits	Minister of Civilian Intelligence Services; 1998–2000	Succeeded by Ervin Demeter
Preceded by Pál Schmitt	Speaker of the National Assembly; 2010–2026	Succeeded by Ágnes Forsthoffer
Preceded by Pál Schmitt	President of Hungary; Acting; 2012	Succeeded by János Áder
Preceded by Katalin Novák	President of Hungary; Acting; 2024	Succeeded by Tamás Sulyok
Party political offices
Preceded by Viktor Orbán	President of Fidesz; 2000–2001	Succeeded by Zoltán Pokorni
