= Kriszta Bódis =

Hungarian politician (born 1967)

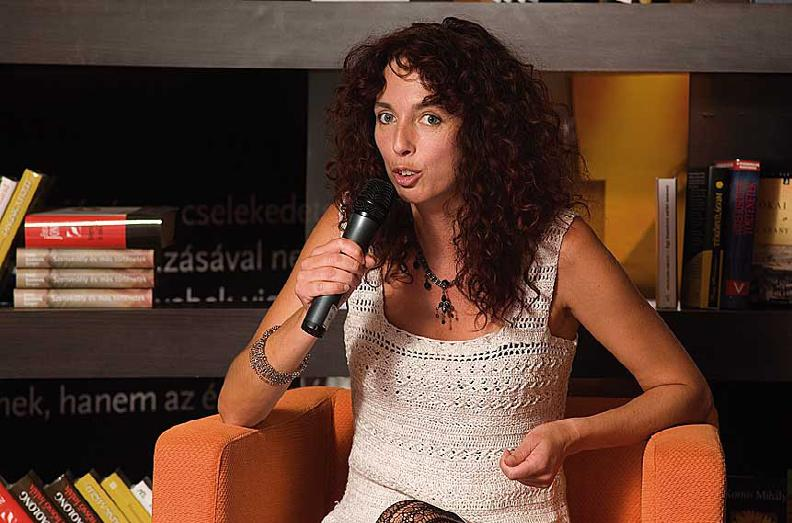
- Bódis in 2012

Commissioner for Social Policy Strategy
- Incumbent
- Assumed office 13 May 2026
- Prime Minister: Peter Magyar
- Preceded by: Office established

Member of the National Assembly
- Incumbent
- Assumed office 9 May 2026
- Preceded by: Anna Orosz
- Constituency: Budapest 2nd

Personal details
- Born: 9 June 1967 (age 58)
- Party: TISZA

Kriszta Bódis (born 9 June 1967) is a Hungarian politician, psychologist, author and filmmaker, who was elected member of the National Assembly in 2026. She is a social policy advisor for the Tisza Party.
