= Péter Kiss =

Hungarian politician

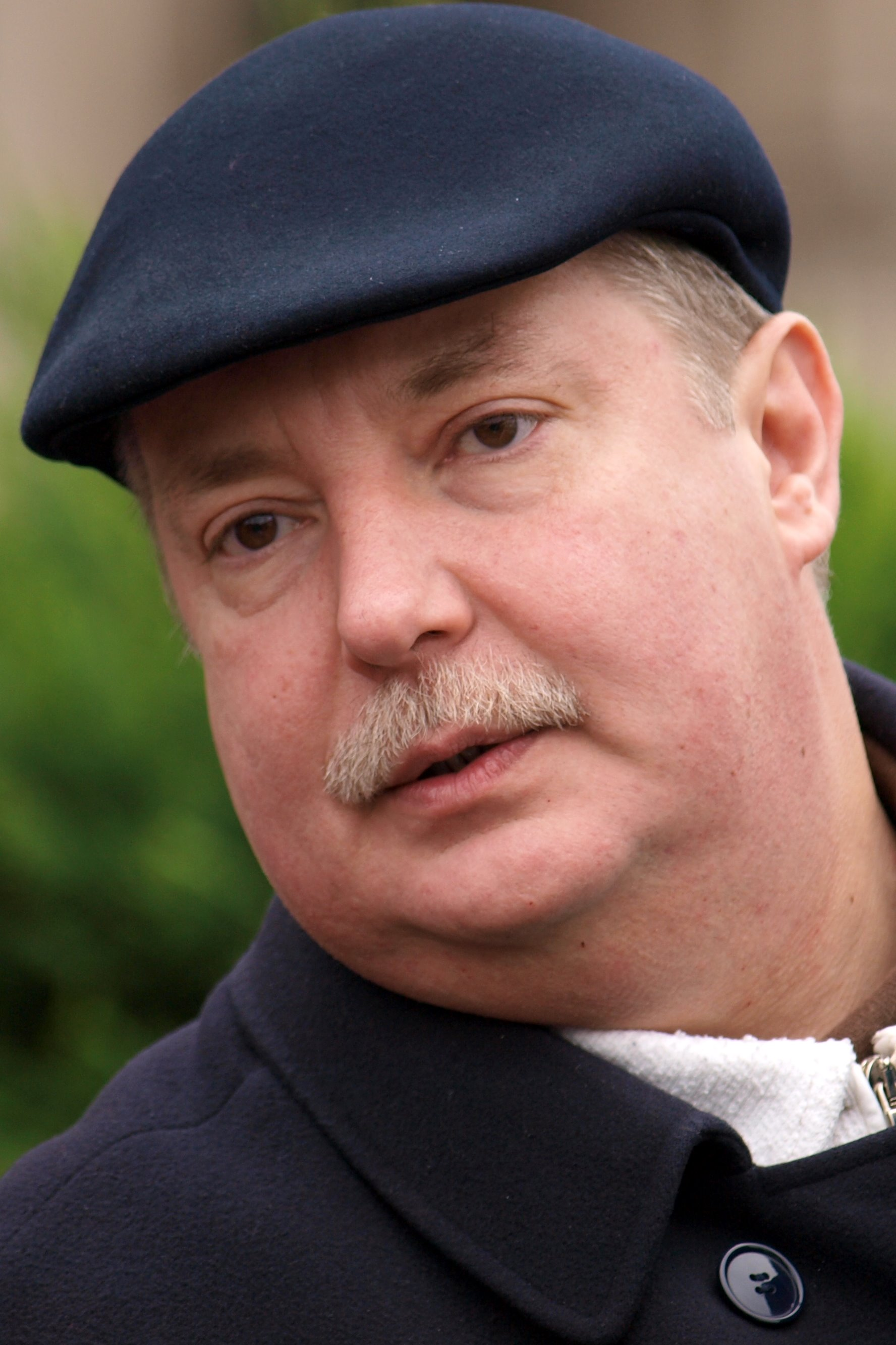

Minister of Social Affairs and Labour
- In office 9 June 2006 – 30 June 2007
- Preceded by: Gábor Csizmár (Minister of Employment and Labour)
- Succeeded by: Mónika Lamperth

Personal details
- Born: 11 June 1959 Celldömölk, Hungary
- Died: 29 July 2014 (aged 55) Budapest, Hungary
- Party: MSZMP, MSZP
- Spouse: Tímea Petykó
- Children: Diána Dóra
- Profession: politician, engineer

Péter Kiss (11 June 1959 – 29 July 2014) was a Hungarian Socialist politician. In Bajnai's government, he was a minister without portfolio. He was one of the candidates to succeed Péter Medgyessy as prime minister in 2004 but lost to Ferenc Gyurcsány.

== Career ==
In 1983 he graduated from the Technical University in Budapest, majoring in engineering. He was a member of the Hungarian Chamber of Engineers and the Society of Economic Sciences.

In 1989 he was a founder and first leader of the Left Youth Association. Since 1992, he was a board member of the Hungarian Socialist Party (MSZP), and since 1994 a member of its presidium. In 1992 he became a member of the National Assembly, where worked until his death. Kiss served as president of MSZP's local branch in Vas County from 2005 to 2009.

In 1995-1998 he served as minister of work in the office of Prime Minister Gyula Horn. From 2002 to 2003 he served as minister of employment and work in the government of Prime Minister Péter Medgyessy. In 2003-2006 he was chief minister in the cabinet of Prime Minister's Office Prime Minister Ferenc Gyurcsány, and then from June 2006 to July 2007 the Minister of Labour and Social Affairs. From July 2007 to April 2009 again held the position of chief minister of the Prime Minister. From 20 April 2009 to May 29, 2010 was a minister without portfolio in the cabinet of Prime Minister Gordon Bajnai.

Kiss also became a member of the National Assembly after the 2010 Hungarian parliamentary election winning a seat from the national list of MSZP. He was a member of the parliamentary Committee for Employment and Labour and deputy chairman of the Subcommittee for European Affairs. Between 29 June 2010 and 7 March 2011 he also worked for the ad hoc committee for the preparation of Constitution which was responsible for drafting the new constitution. He was elected MP for Újpest during the 2014 Hungarian parliamentary election.

== Personal life ==
He was married. His wife was Tímea Petykó. They had a daughter, Diána Dóra.

== Death ==
Kiss died on 29 July 2014 due to prolonged illness. Commenting on his death, former PM Gyurcsány said Kiss was "a good man, an honest politician, a democrat, who excelled in peace-making and seeking compromises." Gordon Bajnai sent a message to the press, which he wrote Kiss "had been more than a politician, he was a statesman. He was a crucial player in helping Hungary successfully overcome one of the hardest crises of the past 30 years with the least possible pain suffered." András Schiffer, leader of the Politics Can Be Different told Kiss "understood and represented the desires of the country's employees and workers."

Kiss was buried in Kerepesi Cemetery on 15 August 2014. Several politicians and public figures attended the event, including former prime ministers Péter Boross, Péter Medgyessy, Ferenc Gyurcsány and Gordon Bajnai.

Political offices
Preceded by Magda Kósáné Kovács	Minister of Labour; 1995–1998	Succeeded by Péter Harrach
Preceded by Péter Harrach	Minister of Employment and Labour; 2002–2003	Succeeded by Sándor Burány
Preceded by Imre Szekeres	Minister of Prime Minister's Office; 2003–2006	Succeeded by György Szilvásy
Preceded by Gábor Csizmár	Minister of Social Affairs and Labour; 2006–2007	Succeeded by Mónika Lamperth
Preceded by György Szilvásy	Minister of Prime Minister's Office; 2007–2009	Succeeded by Csaba Molnár
