= Gábor Juhász =

Hungarian politician

Minister of Civilian Intelligence Services of Hungary
- In office 17 September 2009 – 29 May 2010
- Preceded by: Csaba Molnár
- Succeeded by: position abolished

Personal details
- Born: 14 July 1963 (age 63) Salgótarján, Hungary
- Party: MSZMP, MSZP
- Profession: politician

Gábor Juhász (born 14 July 1963) is a Hungarian politician, who served as Minister of Civilian Intelligence Services of Hungary between 2009 and 2010.

Political offices
Preceded by Csaba Molnár	Minister of Civilian Intelligence Services; 2009–2010	Succeeded by position abolished
