= Zoltán Varga (politician) =

Hungarian politician

Minister of Local Government of Hungary
- In office 16 April 2009 – 29 May 2010
- Prime Minister: Gordon Bajnai
- Preceded by: István Gyenesei
- Succeeded by: Sándor Pintér (Interior Minister)

Personal details
- Born: 17 September 1952 (age 73) Miskolc, Hungary
- Party: Hungarian Socialist Party
- Children: 2
- Profession: engineer-economist, politician

Zoltán Varga (born 17 September 1952 in Miskolc) is a Hungarian engineer-economist and politician. He was the Minister of Local Government in cabinet of Prime Minister Gordon Bajnai. Since 2006 he is one of the members of the Committee of the Regions.

== Political career ==
He spent his student years in Miskolc, although he did his secondary school studies in Kazincbarcika, in a Chemical Industry Technical School. He obtained a chemical industry graduate engineer diploma at the Pollack Mihály Technological College in Pécs. First he obtained a special engineer then an engineer-economist diploma. Although he met his wife, Erzsébet Vági in Pécs, he established a family in Orosháza, where in 1979 he worked in the local glassworks as a graduate engineer. In 1997 he left the glassworks in Orosháza as the works manager when he was elected as the president of the Representative Body of Békés County. From 1998 he worked as a works manager of the industrial park in Orosháza when in the municipal elections he was elected as the president of the general assembly in Békés County again.

In 1990 he was a founder member of the Organisation in Orosháza of the Hungarian Socialist Party. In 1994 he was elected as the member of the representative body in Békés County. Meanwhile, until 1997 he was the leader of the parliamentary group of the Hungarian Socialist Party. He occupied this position between 1998 and 2002 as well. During this time period he also worked as the president of the Economic Committee. In 2000 he was elected as the party's vice president of the county which position he still occupies.

In 2006 and 2010 at the parliamentary elections he obtained a mandate on the regional list in Békés County.

== Trivia ==
He has an oral intermediate language exam in English. In his free time he likes playing tennis and going on excursions.

Political offices
Preceded by István Gyenesei	Minister of Local Government; 2009–2010	Succeeded by Sándor Pintér
