= Mónika Lamperth =

Hungarian politician and jurist

Minister of the Interior of Hungary
- In office 27 May 2002 – 9 June 2006
- Preceded by: Sándor Pintér
- Succeeded by: post abolished

Minister of Local Government of Hungary
- In office 9 June 2006 – 30 June 2007
- Preceded by: post established
- Succeeded by: Gordon Bajnai

Minister of Social Affairs and Labour of Hungary
- In office 30 June 2007 – 5 May 2008
- Preceded by: Péter Kiss
- Succeeded by: Erika Szűcs

Personal details
- Born: 5 September 1957 (age 68) Bácsbokod, Hungary
- Party: Hungarian Socialist Party
- Spouse: Dr András Jegesy
- Children: Vera; András
- Profession: politician, jurist

Mónika Lamperth (born 5 September 1957 in Bácsbokod) is a Hungarian politician and jurist, who served as Interior Minister between 2002 and 2006, after that she became Minister of Local Government until 2007, while Ferenc Gyurcsány appointed her as Minister of Social Affairs and Labour.

== Personal life ==
She is married to Dr András Jegesy. They have a daughter, Vera and a son, András.

Political offices
Preceded by Sándor Pintér	Minister of the Interior; 2002–2006	Succeeded by post abolished
Preceded by post established	Minister of Local Government; 2006–2007	Succeeded by Gordon Bajnai
Preceded by Péter Kiss	Minister of Social Affairs and Labour; 2007–2008	Succeeded by Erika Szűcs
