= Csaba Molnár =

Hungarian politician

Csaba Molnár MEP
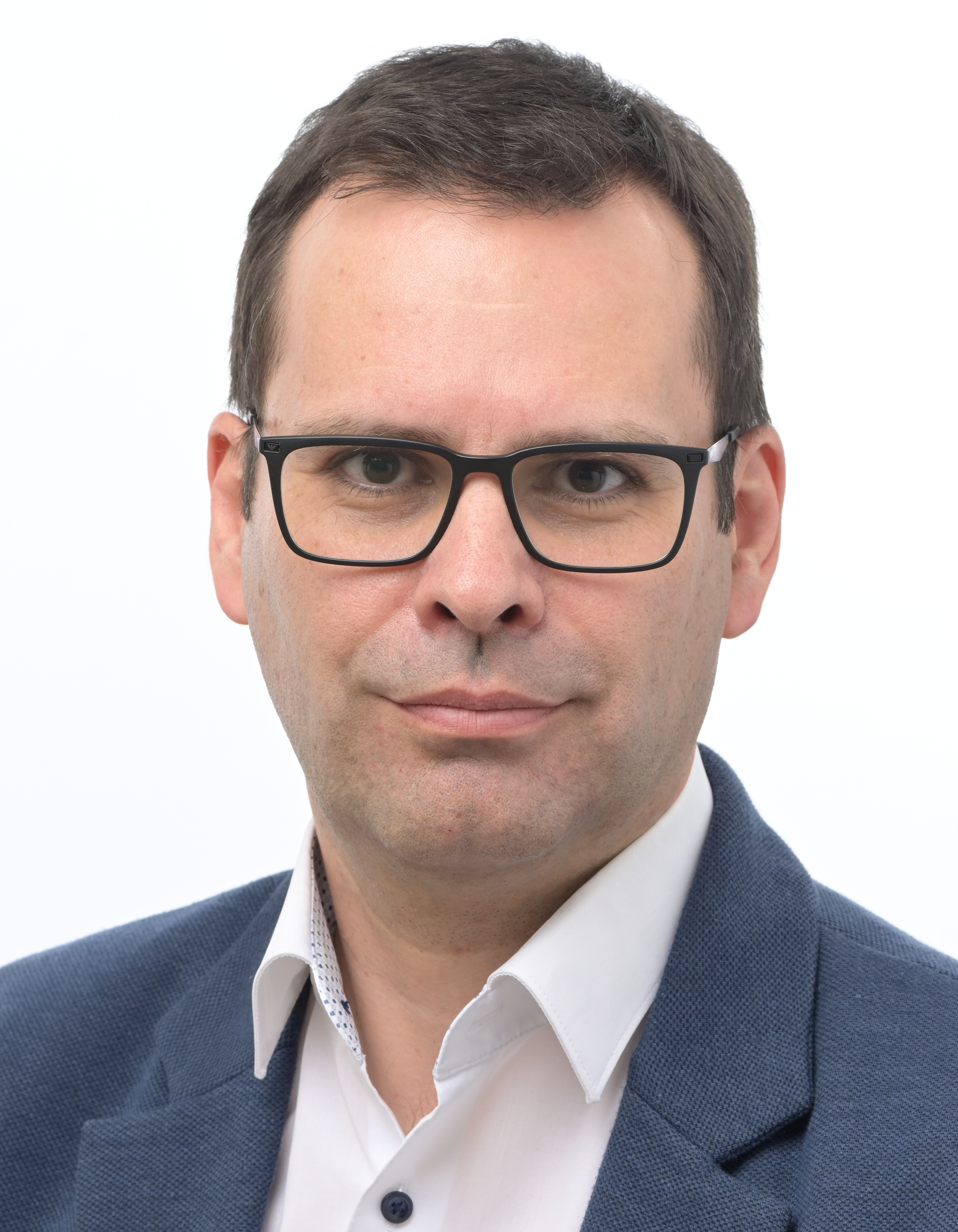
- Official portrait, 2024

Member of the European Parliament
- Incumbent
- Assumed office 1 July 2014
- Constituency: Hungary

Minister of the Prime Minister's Office
- In office 20 April 2009 – 29 May 2010
- Prime Minister: Gordon Bajnai

Personal details
- Born: 4 December 1975 (age 50) Csorna, Hungary
- Party: Hungarian: Democratic Coalition; EU: Party of European Socialists
- Spouse: Kinga Szűcs
- Children: 1

Csaba Molnár (born 4 December 1975) is a Hungarian politician and Member of the European Parliament (MEP). He is a member of the Democratic Coalition. He served as Minister of Transport, Communications and Energy in the second cabinet of Ferenc Gyurcsány, later as a Minister of the Prime Minister's Office (Minister of Chancellery) in the government of Gordon Bajnai.

== Political career ==
Molnár was a part of Gyurcsány's inner circle in the Hungarian Socialist Party (MSZP). As a result, he joined Democratic Coalition Platform founded by the former prime minister and became its deputy chairman. When the platform split from the Socialists on 22 October 2011 he joined to newly formed party and left the MSZP and its parliamentary group. He was appointed leader of the parliamentary group, however according to the decision of the Constitutional and Procedural Committee, the Democratic Coalition could not form an own parliamentary group because of the parliamentary house rules. Molnár was elected one of the four deputy chairmen of the Democratic Coalition on 6 November 2011.

He participated in a week-long hunger strike, along with three other members of the Democratic Coalition (party leader Gyurcsány, Péter Niedermüller and István Kolber) which started in Kossuth tér on 9 September 2012. The demonstration, called Seven Days for Free Elections, was a protest against the proposed voter registration plan by ruling party Fidesz.

=== Member of the European Parliament, 2014–present ===
Molnár was elected to the European Parliament during the 2014 European election. He is a member of the Committee on Economic and Monetary Affairs and a substitute member of the Committee on Industry, Research and Energy. In this capacity, he is his parliamentary group's shadow rapporteur on renewable energy.

In addition to his committee assignments, Molnár is a member of the parliament's delegation for relations with the countries of Southeast Asia and the Association of Southeast Asian Nations (ASEAN).

== Personal life ==
He is married to Kinga Szűcs. They have a son, András.

Political offices
Preceded by Pál Szabó	Minister of Transport, Communications and Energy; 2008–2009	Succeeded by Péter Hónig
Preceded by Péter Kiss	Minister of Prime Minister's Office; 2009–2010	Succeeded by Mihály Varga
Preceded by Ádám Ficsor	Minister of Civilian Intelligence Services; Acting; 2009	Succeeded by Gábor Juhász
