= Tibor Füzessy =

Hungarian politician and jurist (1928–2023)

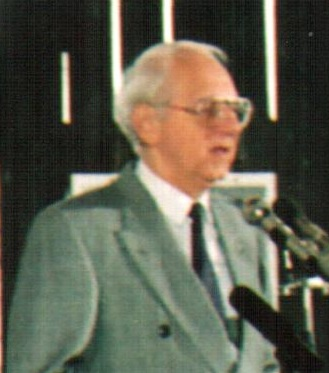
- Füzessy in 1993

Minister of Civilian Intelligence Services of Hungary
- In office 18 June 1992 – 15 July 1994
- Preceded by: Péter Boross
- Succeeded by: Béla Katona

Personal details
- Born: 14 September 1928 Sashalom (today part of Budapest), Hungary
- Died: 19 July 2023 (aged 94)
- Party: KDNP
- Profession: Politician, jurist

Tibor Füzessy (14 September 1928 – 19 July 2023) was a Hungarian politician and jurist, who served as Minister of Civilian Intelligence Services of Hungary between 1992 and 1994.

Füzessy died on 19 July 2023, at the age of 94.

== Sources ==
- Biográf ki kicsoda (Budapest, 2003)
- Bölöny, József – Hubai, László: Magyarország kormányai 1848–2004 [Cabinets of Hungary 1848–2004], Akadémiai Kiadó, Budapest, 2004 (5th edition).

Political offices
Preceded by Péter Boross	Minister of Civilian Intelligence Services; 1992–1994	Succeeded by Béla Katona
