= Gábor Ivády =

Hungarian politician

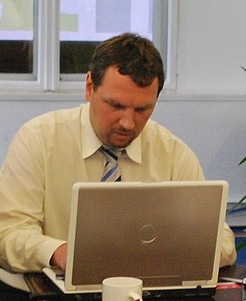

Member of the National Assembly
- In office 14 May 2010 – 5 May 2014

Mayor of Ivád
- In office 20 October 2002 – 12 October 2014
- Preceded by: István Forgó
- Succeeded by: László Valyon

Personal details
- Born: 15 July 1973 (age 53) Körmend, Hungary
- Party: Fidesz, LMP, KTI
- Profession: political scientist

Gábor Ivády (born 15 July 1973) was a Hungarian politician, member of the National Assembly (MP) from 2010 to 2014. He seated as an independent MP.

== Biography ==
He was born in Körmend and raised in Pápa. He attended military college then he worked in advertising. He moved to Ivád, Heves County in 2001 whence his ancestors came from. He was elected deputy-mayor of the municipality in 2002. He degree in political science faculty.

He served as constituency chairman of the Fidesz for a year between 2004 and 2005. He resigned from this position and left the party. He was a candidate of the Hungarian Democratic Forum (MDF) in the 2006 parliamentary election. Later he was a founding member of the Politics Can Be Different (LMP) social initiative which later was transformed into a party. He became a member of the 13-member leadership board. During the 2009 European elections in Hungary he received second place in the LMP-HP joint list. In the 2010 parliamentary election he was a candidate of the 5th Constituency of Heves County. He became a member of the National Assembly of Hungary from the party's national list.

In the 2010 local elections he won the mayoral election in Ivád and became mayor again. He was the only mayor from the LMP in the country. However he left the party on 21 October 2010. Ivády became a member of the Community for Social Justice People's Party (KTI) in 2013. KTI did not reach the election threshold in the 2014 parliamentary election.

In the 2014 local elections he lost the mayoral election in Ivád and established a labour union KFDSZ.
