= Erika Szűcs =

Hungarian politician and economist

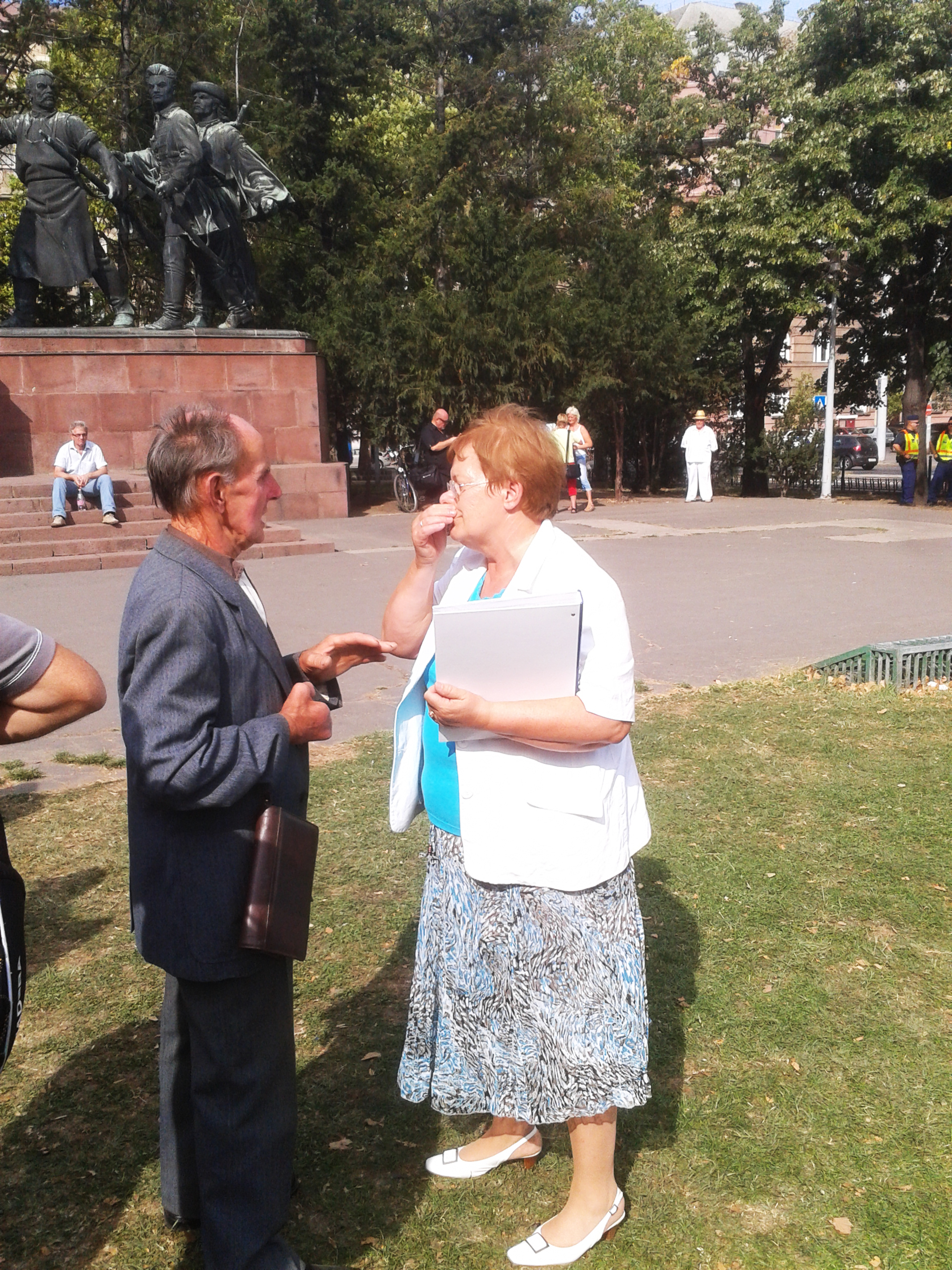
- Szűcs (right) touching her nose

Minister of Social Affairs and Labour
- In office 5 May 2008 – 14 April 2009
- Preceded by: Mónika Lamperth
- Succeeded by: László Herczog

Personal details
- Born: 2 April 1951 (age 75) Budapest, Hungary
- Party: MSZMP, MSZP, DK
- Children: 2
- Profession: politician, economist

Erika Mária Szűcs (born April 2, 1951) is a Hungarian politician and economist, who served as Minister of Social Affairs and Labour from 5 May 2008 to 14 April 2009 in the second cabinet of Prime Minister Ferenc Gyurcsány. She was a member of the National Assembly of Hungary from August 27, 2004 to May 5, 2014.

At the end of 2010 she joined Democratic Coalition Platform founded by Gyurcsány and became a member of its leadership. When the platform split from the Hungarian Socialist Party (MSZP) on October 22, 2011 she joined the newly formed party and left the MSZP and its parliamentary group.

Political offices
Preceded by Mónika Lamperth	Minister of Social Affairs and Labour; 2008–2009	Succeeded by László Herczog
