= Minister of Civilian Intelligence Services (Hungary) =

The minister without portfolio for civilian intelligence services of Hungary (Hungarian: Magyarország polgári titkosszolgálatokat felügyelő tárca nélküli minisztere), nicknamed the minister of secret (Hungarian: titokminiszter), was a member of the Hungarian cabinet between 1990 and 2010. The minister was tasked with supervising the Information Office, the National Security Office and the National Security Service. The last minister was Gábor Juhász.

== Ministers of civilian intelligence services (1990–2010) ==
=== Hungarian Republic (1989–2010) ===
Parties MDF KDNP MSZP Fidesz Independent

| # | Picture | Name | From | Until | Political party | Cabinet | Assembly (Election) |
|---|---|---|---|---|---|---|---|
| 1 | | Péter Boross (1928–) | 19 July 1990 | 21 December 1990 | MDF | Antall; MDF–FKGP–KDNP | 34 (1990) |
| 2 | | András Gálszécsy (1933–2021) | 21 December 1990 | 29 February 1992 | Independent | Antall; MDF–FKGP–KDNP | 34 (1990) |
| — | | Péter Boross (1928–) acting | 29 February 1992 | 18 June 1992 | MDF | Antall; MDF–FKGP–KDNP | 34 (1990) |
| 3 | | Tibor Füzessy (1928–2023) | 18 June 1992 | 21 December 1993 | KDNP | Antall; MDF–FKGP–KDNP | 34 (1990) |
| 3 | | Tibor Füzessy (1928–2023) | 21 December 1993 | 15 July 1994 | KDNP | Boross; MDF–EKGP–KDNP | 34 (1990) |
| 4 | | Béla Katona (1944–) | 15 July 1994 | 1 April 1995 | MSZP | Horn; MSZP–SZDSZ | 35 (1994) |
| 5 | | István Nikolits (1946–) | 1 April 1995 | 8 July 1998 | MSZP | Horn; MSZP–SZDSZ | 35 (1994) |
| 6 | | László Kövér (1959–) | 8 July 1998 | 3 May 2000 | Fidesz | Orbán I Fidesz–FKGP–MDF | 36 (1998) |
| 7 | | Ervin Demeter (1954–) | 3 May 2000 | 27 May 2002 | Fidesz | Orbán I Fidesz–FKGP–MDF | 36 (1998) |
| — | | vacant (under the supervision of Prime Minister's Office) | 27 May 2002 | 4 October 2004 | — | Medgyessy; MSZP–SZDSZ | 37 (2002) |
| — | | vacant (under the supervision of Prime Minister's Office) | 4 October 2004 | 9 June 2006 | — | Gyurcsány I MSZP–SZDSZ | 37 (2002) |
| — | | vacant (under the supervision of Prime Minister's Office) | 9 June 2006 | 30 June 2006 | — | Gyurcsány II; MSZP–SZDSZ | 38 (2006) |
| 8 | | György Szilvásy (1958–) | 1 July 2006 | 14 April 2009 | Independent | Gyurcsány II; MSZP–SZDSZ | 38 (2006) |
| 9 | | Ádám Ficsor (1980–) | 14 April 2009 | 13 September 2009 | MSZP | Bajnai; MSZP | 38 (2006) |
| — | | Csaba Molnár (1975–) acting | 14 September 2009 | 16 September 2009 | MSZP | Bajnai; MSZP | 38 (2006) |
| 10 | | Gábor Juhász (1963–) | 17 September 2009 | 29 May 2010 | MSZP | Bajnai; MSZP | 38 (2006) |

== See also ==
- List of heads of state of Hungary
- List of prime ministers of Hungary
- Politics of Hungary

Cabinet ministers

- Minister of Agriculture (Hungary)
- Minister of Croatian Affairs of Hungary
- Minister of Defence (Hungary)
- Minister of Education (Hungary)
- Minister of Finance (Hungary)
- Minister of Foreign Affairs (Hungary)
- Minister of the Interior (Hungary)
- Minister of Justice (Hungary)
- Minister of Public Works and Transport (Hungary)
