= Ervin Demeter =

Hungarian politician (born 1954)

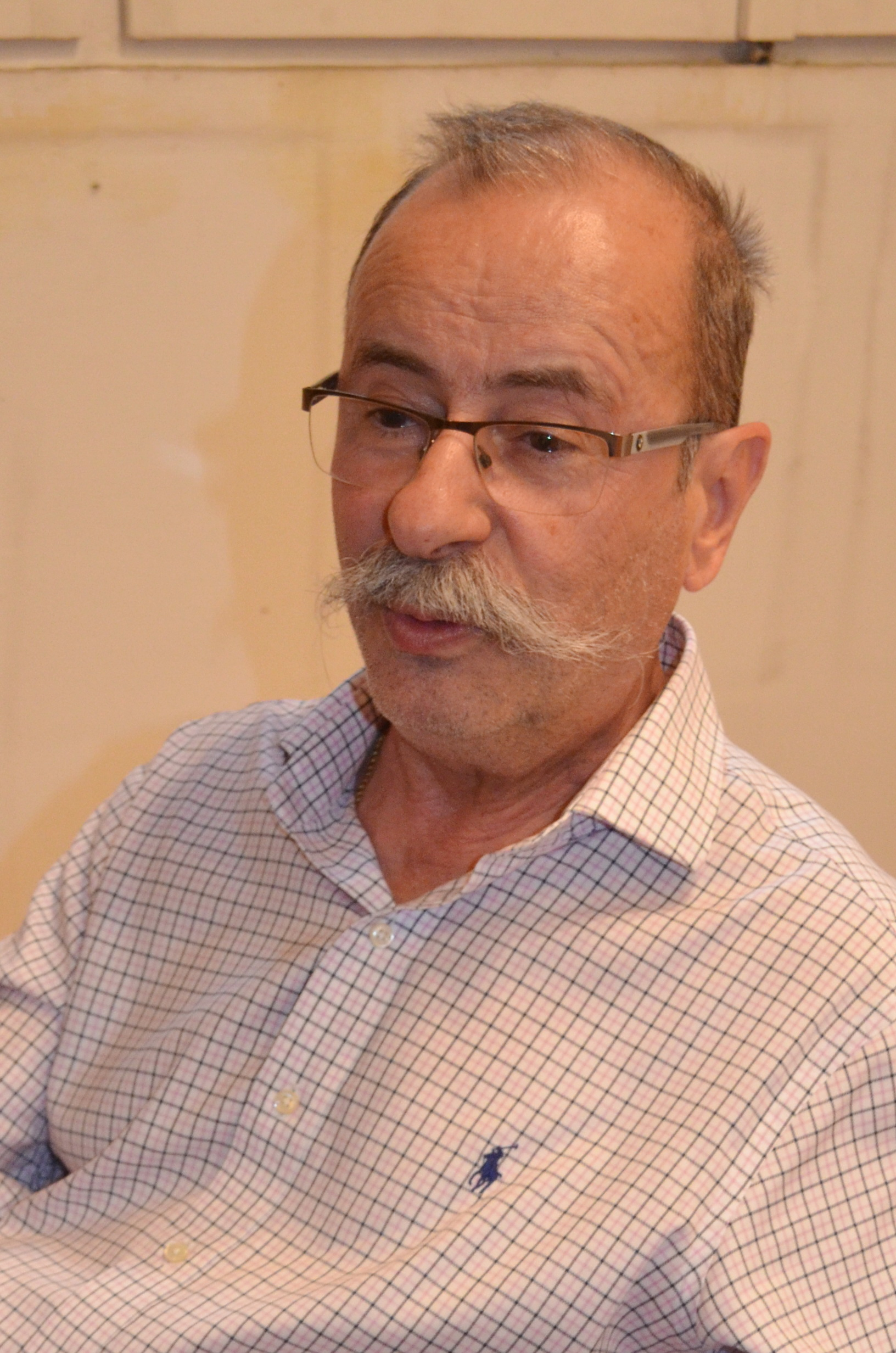

Minister of Civilian Intelligence Services of Hungary
- In office 3 May 2000 – 27 May 2002
- Preceded by: László Kövér
- Succeeded by: Vacant

Personal details
- Born: 21 December 1954 (age 71) Budapest, Hungary
- Party: MDF, Fidesz
- Spouse: Edit Kulcsár
- Children: Endre
- Profession: politician

Ervin Demeter (born 21 December 1954) is a Hungarian politician, who served as Minister of Civilian Intelligence Services of Hungary between 2000 and 2002.

== Personal life ==
He is married. His wife is Edit Kulcsár. They have a son, Endre.

National Assembly of Hungary
Preceded by Iván Szabó	Leader of the MDF parliamentary group 1996–1998	Succeeded by István Balsai
Political offices
Preceded by László Kövér	Minister of Civilian Intelligence Services; 2000–2002	Succeeded by Post abolished 2002–2006; Title next held by György Szilvásy
