= István Gyenesei =

Hungarian politician (1948–2024)

Minister of Local Government of Hungary
- In office 15 May 2008 – 16 April 2009
- Prime Minister: Ferenc Gyurcsány
- Preceded by: Gordon Bajnai
- Succeeded by: Zoltán Varga

Personal details
- Born: 1 April 1948 Kaposvár, Hungary
- Died: 21 March 2024 (aged 75)
- Party: Association for Somogy
- Spouse: Judit Horváth
- Children: Leila Gyenesei and two others
- Profession: Politician

István Gyenesei (1 April 1948 – 21 March 2024) was a Hungarian politician and the Chairman of the Association for Somogy party. He was the only representative in the Hungarian National Assembly who gained a seat as an independent. During the formation of the minority government in April 2008, Prime Minister Ferenc Gyurcsány appointed him as Minister of Local Government. He did not get a post in the cabinet of Gordon Bajnai in 2009.

He had several children. The youngest daughter, Leila Gyenesei, is a pentathlete who participated in the 2006 Winter Olympics and 2008 Summer Olympics.

István Gyenesei died on 21 March 2024, at the age of 75.

== Sources ==
- MTI Ki Kicsoda 2009, Magyar Távirati Iroda Zrt., Budapest, 2008, 409. old., ISSN 1787-288X
- Gyenesei országgyűlési adatlapja

Political offices
Preceded by Gordon Bajnai	Minister of Local Government; 2008–2009	Succeeded by Zoltán Varga
