= Béla Katona =

Hungarian politician

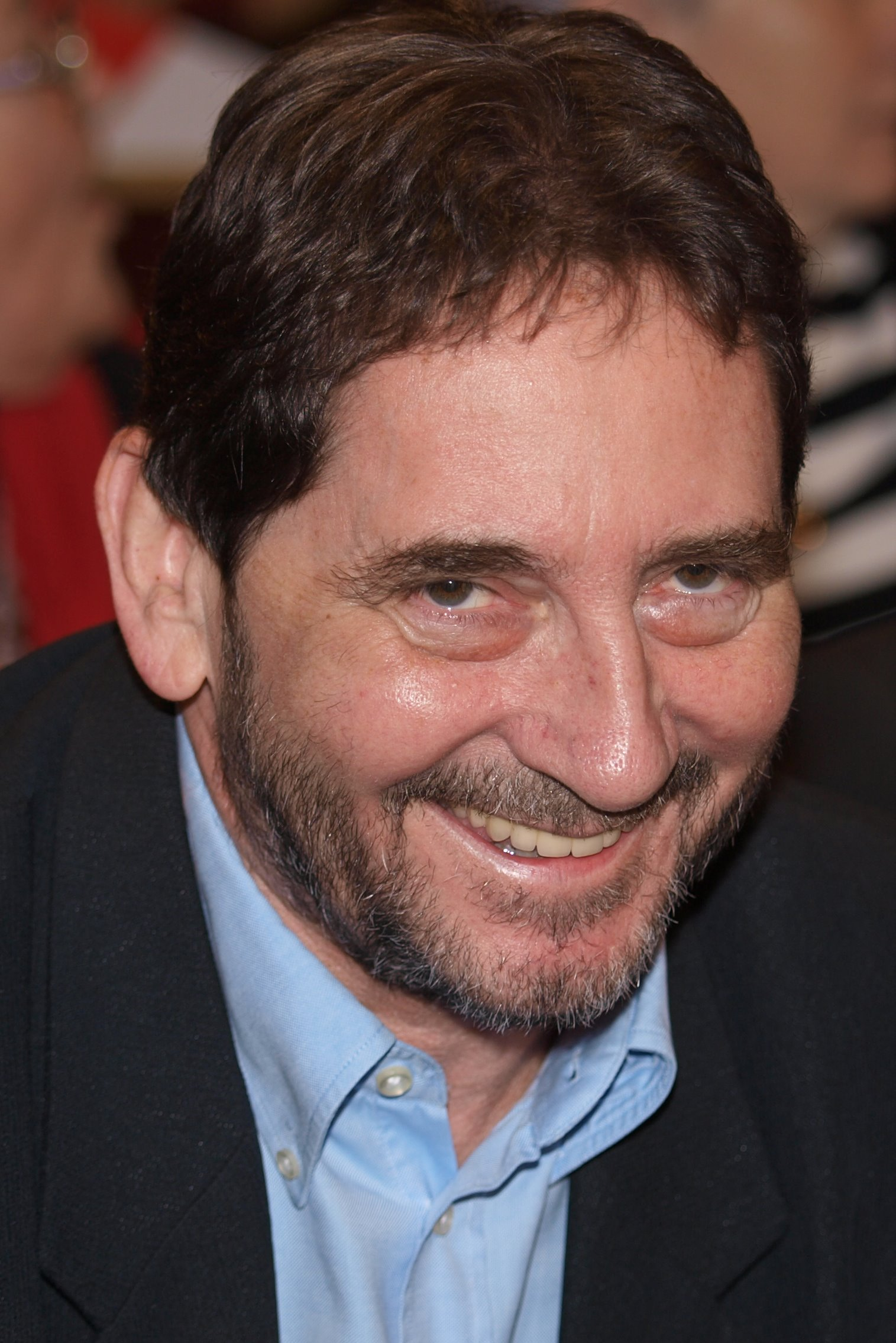
- Katona in 2010

Speaker of the National Assembly
- In office 15 September 2009 – 13 May 2010
- Preceded by: Katalin Szili
- Succeeded by: Pál Schmitt

Personal details
- Born: 9 February 1944 (age 82) Budapest, Hungary
- Party: MSZMP, MSZP
- Profession: politician, engineer

Béla Katona (born 9 February 1944) is a Hungarian politician (MSZP), who served as Speaker of the National Assembly of Hungary from 2009 to 2010.

Political offices
Preceded by Tibor Füzessy	Minister of Civilian Intelligence Services; 1994–1995	Succeeded by István Nikolits
Preceded by Katalin Szili	Speaker of the National Assembly; 2009–2010	Succeeded by Pál Schmitt
