= György Szilvásy =

Hungarian politician

Minister of Civilian Intelligence Services of Hungary
- In office 30 June 2006 – 14 April 2009
- Preceded by: Vacant
- Succeeded by: Ádám Ficsor

Personal details
- Born: 29 April 1958 (age 67) Budapest, Hungary
- Party: MSZP
- Children: 2
- Profession: politician

György Szilvásy (born April 29, 1958, Budapest) is a Hungarian politician, a former minister in the cabinet of Ferenc Gyurcsány supervising the secret service.

== Education and career ==
He obtained an economic degree in the academic specialization of international relations in 1982 from Marx Károly Közgazdaságtudományi Egyetem (today Corvinus University). In 1985 he obtained a doctoral title.

In the Prime Minister's Office (MEH), of Imre Pozsgay he worked as a government chief counselor on a Ministers of State secretariat in 1989. He was also the spokesman of the Hungarian Young Communist League (KISZ) central committee in the same year (previously he was KISZ leader at the university). He met Ferenc Gyurcsány, who became Prime Minister at KISZ during this time.

Between 1989 and 1990 he was on the supervisory board of Magyar Televízió and Magyar Rádió, and held a position as under-secretary in Prime Minister's Office (MEH). Between 1998 and 2000 he was the CEO of Altus corp. the company owned by his close friend Ferenc Gyurcsány. Soon after Gyurcsány became Prime Minister he appointed Szilvásy as his minister of the chancellery. Between 2006 and 2007 Szilvásy was leading Cabinet Minister of the office of the Prime Minister. After June 2007 he became minister supervising the secret service. He lost that position after Gordon Bajnai succeeded Gyurcsány as Prime Minister.

=== Criminal charge and trial ===
He was arrested in July 2011. News channel Hír TV reported on 1 July evening that a house search had been carried out at the home of Szilvásy. According to Hír TV, the house search was connected to a statement by Lajos Galambos, former chief director of the National Security Office (NBH) who was under house arrest on espionage charges. The main opposition Socialist Party stands up for György Szilvásy, believes that he is innocent and expresses solidarity with the former minister in charge of the secret services during the Gyurcsány government, Socialist leader Attila Mesterházy said on 2 July. Ferenc Gyurcsány said on Facebook earlier on that day that he had been informed by Szilvásy’s family that the former minister is suspected of criminal activities against the state.

On 5 July 2013, a court in Debrecen sentenced in a non-final ruling Szilvásy and Galambos to two years and ten months in prison for espionage. The trial was held in full secrecy and the files of the case have been classified until 2040 because, as the prosecution put it, “several state secrets have emerged during the lawsuit”. Szilvásy told MTI that he had been sentenced without any evidence brought up during the trial.

The opposition Socialists said they believed in Szilvásy’s innocence. As long as the files of the case are classified, the Socialist consider the lawsuit against Szilvásy to be based on trumped-up charges, Socialist leader Mesterházy said. Ex-premier Ferenc Gyurcsány, leader of the leftist Democratic Coalition, expressed solidarity with his former minister. Gyurcsány called it characteristic of the “absurd world of the Orbán government” that, for the first time since the 1950s, a former minister has been sentenced to a term in prison. The opposition E14-PM electoral alliance called for the files of the case to be made public.

Commenting the sentence, a Fidesz spokesman said that “a key figure of the mafia left wing could be put behind bars”. Máté Kocsis called Szilvásy a close associate of Gyurcsány, ex-premier Gordon Bajnai and Mesterhazy, whom he co-blamed for “destroying the country both economically and morally”. It is, therefore, no surprise that they have expressed solidarity with him, he said.

== Family ==
Szilvásy is married, with two children. One of his brothers, Péter Szilvásy called attention to himself with operating the so-called Kormányzati Tanácsadó Jósda in 2007. His other brother, István Szilvásy is heading the national medical centre (ÁEK) from 2007.

Political offices
Preceded by Péter Kiss	Minister of Prime Minister's Office; 2006–2007	Succeeded by Péter Kiss
Preceded by Post abolished 2002–2006; Title last held by Ervin Demeter	Minister of Civilian Intelligence Services; 2006–2009	Succeeded by Ádám Ficsor
