= Constitution Protection Office =

Hungarian governmental intelligence agency

- Alkotmányvédelmi Hivatal
- The AH logo. The bird is a turul and the shield itself the Arpad stripes of ancient Hungary. Its slogan means: "The homeland before all!"

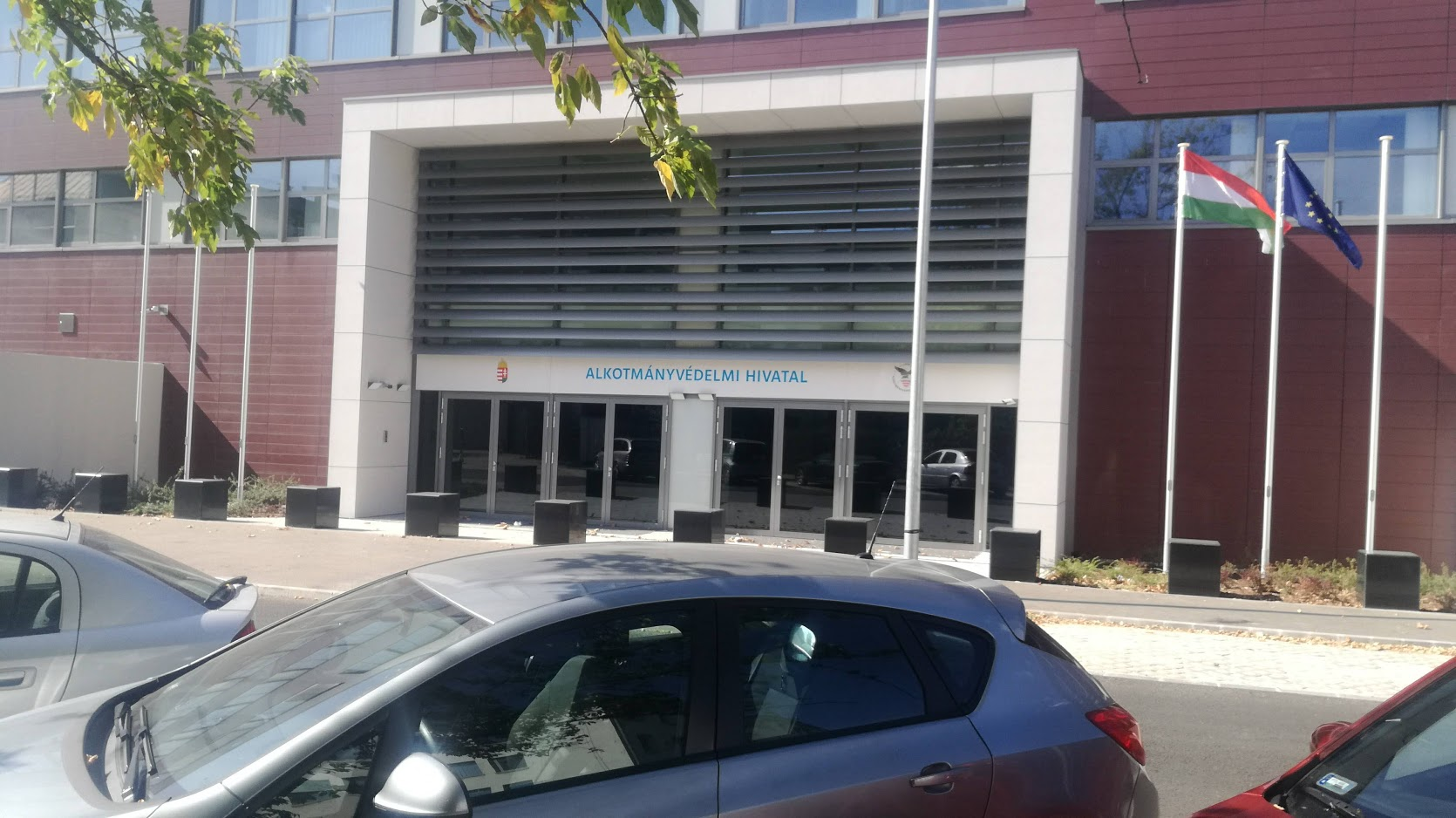

Agency overview
- Formed: 2010
- Type: Secret police Intelligence agency
- Jurisdiction: Hungary
- Headquarters: Budapest; 47°27′59″N 19°02′41″E
- Parent agency: Ministry of Interior

The Constitution Protection Office (Hungarian: Alkotmányvédelmi Hivatal, "AH") is a Hungarian internal security intelligence agency, formerly known as Nemzetbiztonsági Hivatal (En. Office of National Security). Its primary responsibilities are: counterintelligence, anticorruption, economic security and related proactive measures. The AH also leads investigations against organized crime and deals with (mainly internal) threats against society (such as subversion).

AH has been active since 2010.

== General Directors ==
- Dr. Bárdos Szabolcs
- Zoltán Kiss
