= Minister of the Living Environment (Hungary) =

Hungarian cabinet position

Minister of the Living Environment of Hungary
- Magyarország élő környezetért felelős minisztére

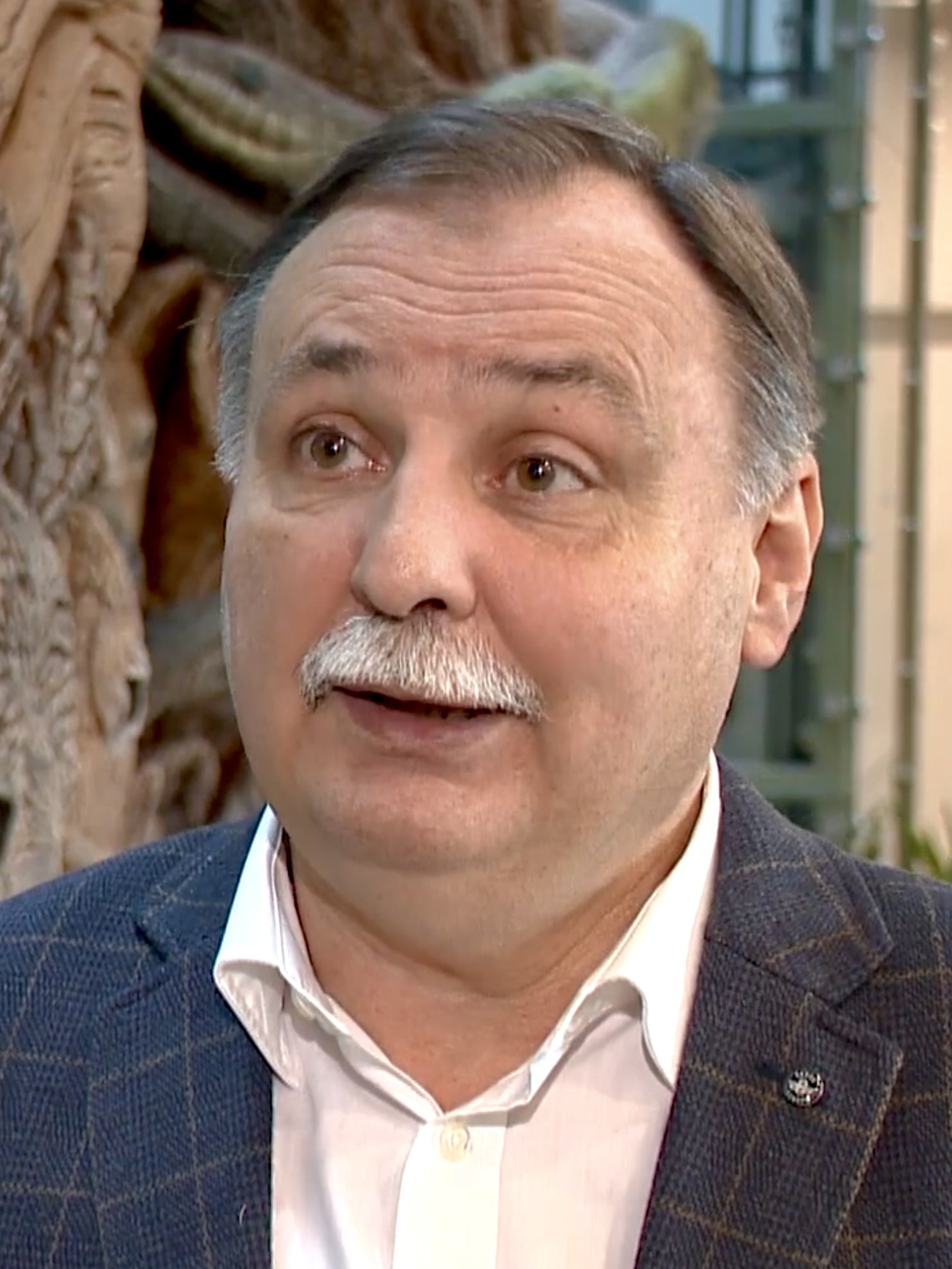
- Incumbent; László Gajdos since 13 May 2026
- Ministry of the Living Environment
- Type: Cabinet minister
- Member of: Cabinet; Council; Parliament
- Nominator: Prime Minister of Hungary
- Appointer: President of Hungary
- Inaugural holder: László Maróthy
- Formation: 16 December 1987 (as the Minister of Environment and Water Management)

The Minister of the Living Environment (Hungarian: Élő környezetért felelős minisztére, EKFM) is a member of the Hungarian cabinet. The position has undergone various iterations over the years since its creation in 1987 as the Minister of the Environment and Water Management. The current iteration was created in 2026 under the Magyar Government, under which it assumes responibilites similar to that of its predecessors.

== History ==
The environment and water portfolios have previously existed under various cabinet positions from 1987 to 2010. Between 1990 and 2002, the water functions were under the Ministry of Transport, Communication and Water; environmental responsibilities continued under the Ministry for Environment Protection, then, from October 1990 to 1998, as the Ministry of Environment and Regional Development, and then, from 1998 to 2002, once again as the Ministry of Environment Protection.

In April 1988, the Ministry of Environment and Water was established through a merger of the National Water Bureau and the National Environment and Nature Protection Office. In July 1990, the Ministry of Transport, Communication and Water assumed the responsibility of water affairs, taking it from the Ministry of Environment and Water, which changed its name to the Ministry for Environment Protection and kept that name for several months. It later became known as the Ministry of Environment and Regional Development. In 1998 the Ministry of Environment Protection was established after another reorganization occurred in the governmental ministries.

In 2002, the responsibility of water affairs was transferred from the Ministry for Transport, Communication and Water to the Ministry of Environment Protection, which again became the Ministry of Environment and Water. The ministry was abolished again following the 2010 parliamentary election upon the return of Viktor Orbán as Prime Minister, and responsibities were handed over to the Ministry of Agriculture.

Upon the election of Péter Magyar following the 2026 parliamentary election, it was announced that the position would be reconstituted as its own independent portfolio as the Minister of the Living Environment, carving out part of the mandate of the Ministry of Energy; Former director of the Nyíregyháza Zoo, László Gajdos, was appointed to the position.

== List of ministers ==
=== Minister of the Environment and Water Management (1987-1990) ===
==== Hungarian People's Republic (1987–1989) ====
Parties MSZMP MSZP

| No. | Portrait | Name (Birth–Death) | Term of office | | Political party | Cabinet | Assembly (Election) |
|---|---|---|---|---|---|---|---|
| 1 | | László Maróthy (1942–) | 16 December 1987 | 23 October 1989 | MSZMP | Grósz; MSZMP | 33 (1985) |
| (1) | | László Maróthy (1942–) | 16 December 1987 | 23 October 1989 | MSZP | Németh (MSZMP)→MSZP | 33 (1985) |

==== Third Hungarian Republic / Hungary (1989–1990) ====
Parties MSZP

| No. | Portrait | Name (Birth–Death) | Term of office | | Political party | Cabinet | Assembly (Election) |
|---|---|---|---|---|---|---|---|
| (1) | | László Maróthy (1942–) | 23 October 1989 | 21 November 1989 | MSZP | Németh; MSZP | — |
| — (Note: Appointed as State Secretary.) | | Miklós Varga (1944–) | 21 November 1989 | 23 May 1990 | MSZP | Németh; MSZP | — |

=== Minister of the Environment and Regional Development (1990-1993) ===
==== Third Hungarian Republic / Hungary (1990–1993) ====
Parties MDF

| No. | Portrait | Name (Birth–Death) | Term of office | | Political party | Cabinet | Assembly (Election) |
|---|---|---|---|---|---|---|---|
| 1 | | Sándor Keresztes (1919–2013) | 23 May 1990 | 22 February 1993 | MDF | Antall; MDF | 34 (1990) |
| 2 | | János Gyurkó (1952–1996) | 23 February 1993 | 21 December 1993 | MSZP | Antall; MDF | 34 (1990) |

=== Minister of the Environment and Water (1993-1994) ===
==== Third Hungarian Republic / Hungary ====
Parties MDF

| No. | Portrait | Name (Birth–Death) | Term of office | | Political party | Cabinet | Assembly (Election) |
|---|---|---|---|---|---|---|---|
| 1 | | János Gyurkó (1952–1996) | 21 December 1993 | 15 July 1994 | MDF | Boross; MDF | 34 (1990) |

=== Minister of the Environment and Regional Development (1994-1998) ===
==== Third Hungarian Republic / Hungary ====
Parties MSZP

| No. | Portrait | Name (Birth–Death) | Term of office | | Political party | Cabinet | Assembly (Election) |
|---|---|---|---|---|---|---|---|
| 1 | | Ferenc Baja (1955–) | 15 July 1994 | 7 July 1998 | MSZP | Horn; MSZP | 35 (1994) |

=== Minister of the Environment (1998-2002) ===
==== Third Hungarian Republic / Hungary ====
Parties FKgP

| No. | Portrait | Name (Birth–Death) | Term of office | | Political party | Cabinet | Assembly (Election) |
|---|---|---|---|---|---|---|---|
| 1 | | Pál Pepó (1955–) | 8 July 1998 | 19 June 2000 | FKgP | Orbán I Fidesz | 36 (1998) |
| 2 | | Ferenc Ligetvári (1941–) | 19 June 2000 | 30 November 2000 | FKgP | Orbán I Fidesz | 36 (1998) |
| 3 | | Béla Turi-Kovács (1935–2023) | 30 November 2000 | 27 May 2002 | FKgP | Orbán I Fidesz | 36 (1998) |

=== Minister of the Environment and Water (2002-2010) ===
==== Third Hungarian Republic / Hungary ====
Parties MSZP SZDSZ Independent

| No. | Portrait | Name (Birth–Death) | Term of office | | Political party | Cabinet | Assembly (Election) |
|---|---|---|---|---|---|---|---|
| 1 | | Mária Kóródi (1950–) | 27 May 2002 | 18 May 2003 | SZDSZ | Medgyessy; Independent | 37 (2002) |
| 2 | | Miklós Persányi (1950–) | 18 May 2003 | 3 October 2004 | Independent | Medgyessy; Independent | 37 (2002) |
| 2 | | Miklós Persányi (1950–) | 4 October 2004 | 9 June 2006 | Independent | Gyurcsány I MSZP | 38 (2006) |
| 2 | | Miklós Persányi (1950–) | 9 June 2006 | 6 May 2007 | Independent | Gyurcsány II; MSZP | 38 (2006) |
| 3 | | Gábor Fodor (1962–) | 6 May 2007 | 30 April 2008 | SZDSZ | Gyurcsány II; MSZP | 38 (2006) |
| 4 | | Imre Szabó (1953–) | 30 April 2008 | 16 April 2009 | MSZP | Gyurcsány II; MSZP | 38 (2006) |
| 4 | | Imre Szabó (1953–) | 16 April 2009 | 29 May 2010 | MSZP | Bajnai; Independent | 38 (2006) |

=== Minister of the Living Environment (2026-present) ===
==== Third Hungarian Republic / Hungary ====
Parties TISZA

| No. | Portrait | Name (Birth–Death) | Term of office | | Political party | Cabinet | Assembly (Election) |
|---|---|---|---|---|---|---|---|
| 1 | | László Gajdos (1962-) | 13 May 2026 | Incumbent | TISZA | Magyar; TISZA | 43 (2026) |
