= Family policy in Hungary =

Policy to manage the national birthrate

Family policy in Hungary has been a major focus of various Hungarian governments, with concerted political efforts to increase the country's birth rate and to stop its population decline dating back as far as the 1950s. The country generally follows models aiming to subsidize and encourage childcare for new parents. Specific academic and media attention have been directed to the pronatalist policies pursued by Hungarian governments under Mátyás Rákosi (as well as his minister of health Anna Ratkó) and Viktor Orbán.

== Background ==
Hungary's population has been declining since 1980 when it peaked at 10.7 million. It is the country in Europe whose population has been shrinking for the longest time. Persistently low fertility rates, having first fallen below to sub-replacement fertility in the 1960s, are viewed as being as the main structural cause of this. Compared to the rest of Europe, which also suffers from population ageing as part of a wider demographic transition, Hungary's population numbers are also strained by particularly strong emigration and weak immigration (aside from returning, mostly older members of the Hungarian diaspora living in parts of the former Kingdom of Hungary). The Bokros package, the 2008 financial crisis, and the Euro area crisis all accelerated the downward trend.

This shift is viewed as being problematic due to raising the dependency ratio and threatening the long-term sustainability of public systems, especially pensions and healthcare, which will face rising costs and potential deficits as fewer workers support more retirees. At the same time, a smaller labour force could reduce employment levels and economic growth, making it harder to finance welfare provision and maintain public services.

== History ==
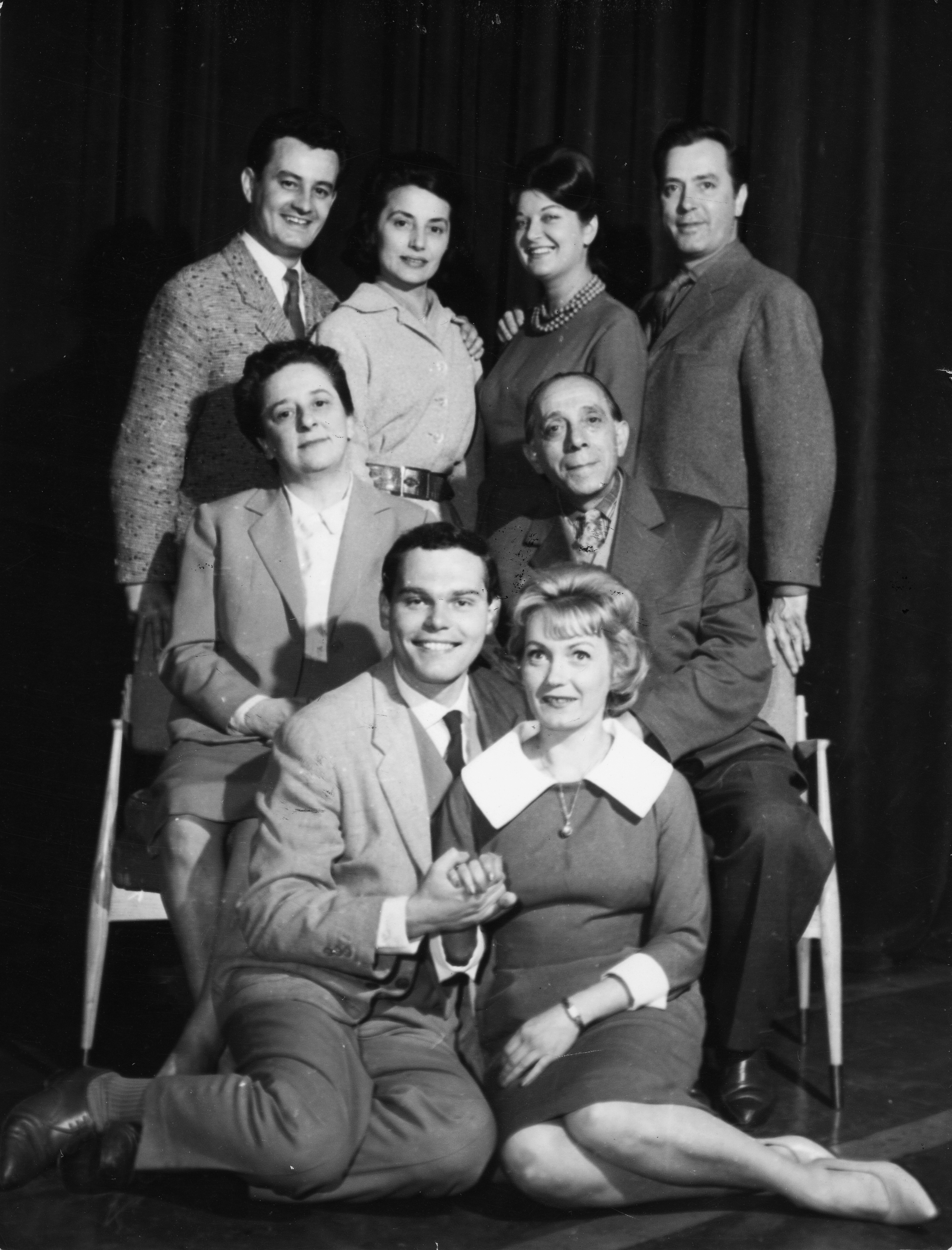
The Szabó family, the most famous soap opera in Hungary during the second half of the 20th century, was a typical depiction of a Hungarian family of the time.

=== Post-war communist period (1949–1989) ===
After World War II, the Hungarian People's Republic implemented policies aimed at supporting women's participation in the workforce participation and families with more children in general. Notable measures included the introduction of the GYES in 1967, which provided financial support for parents of young children with a fixed amount of cash on a per-child basis, and the introduction of GYED in 1985, which provided earnings-related parental leave benefits.

Between 1953 and 1956 specifically, during the so-called Ratkó era, the ministry of health under minister Anna Ratkó pursued aggressively pro-natalist policies aimed at boosting population growth to further ideological goals of a "socialist utopia", as expressed in Resolution 1.004. Measures to achieve this included both benefits (longer maternal leave, increased state stipends for families with three or more children) as well as coercion, notably a tax on childlessness, affecting approximately 4% of the tax base, as well as a ban on abortion combined with increased sanctions against illegal abortions as well intensified propaganda framing motherhood as a civic duty. These measures did noticeably increase the fertility rate, but failed to meet the original demographic goals, were poorly coordinated and deeply unpopular. They were repealed after the Hungarian Revolution of 1956.

=== After communism (1989–2010) ===
Following the end of communism in Hungary, under the Antall, Boross and Horn Governments, family benefits in Hungary were retained from the communist period and initially expanded significantly: In 1992, both the universal flat-rate GYES and the income-scaled GYED were made more generous. Major reforms aimed at rendering the benefits of state-sponsored childcare programs more egalitarian, regardless of the recipients' economic or social background, were passed between 1992 and 1999.

After the GYED was cancelled in 1996 as part of the Bokros package, it was reintroduced by the First Orbán Government in 2000. Additionally, the realization of family tax brakes for working parents (disproportionally benefitting more affluent families) marked the beginning of a gradual shift of prioritizing middle and high-income families which would eventually continue under later Fidesz-led governments (see below). An example of this was the reform of the GYED in 2006, making paid paternal leave more selective via stricter means testing and offering more benefits to high-income earners.

Throughout 2006, the First and Second Gyurcsány Governments would reverse this course of regressively-scaled support by raising the per-child allowances, abolishing the 13th-month family allowance payment, reducing tax credits to cover only a third child and replacing the monthly means-tested child support with two smaller biannual payments, aiming primarily to simplify the system while maintaining overall support levels. This was followed with a new targeted safety-net scheme in June 2006, called the Rendszeres szociális segély, which replaced earlier welfare provisions by serving as a regular payment to top up household income to a certain threshold (tied to family size and the minimum pension). Additional indirect support came from locally administered housing schemes based on household size. The GYES and GYED were maintained, though the former was notably reformed to allow mothers to work full time after their child turned one year old, removing work limits as an eligibility criterium.

=== Fidesz government (2010–2026) ===
Following the return to power of Fidesz under the leadership of Viktor Orbán after the 2010 Hungarian parliamentary election, increasing the birthrate became a major policy focus. This response to perceived demographic decline has been described by analysts as being part of a broader neo-familialist and traditionalist/nationalist ideological project. Shortly after taking office, the government set out a plan to reach a fertility rate of at least 2.1 children per women by 2030. To further these means, family tax credits were substantially expanded, with major fiscal resources being devoted to programs designed to encourage childbearing and increase fertility amid concerns about population loss. In official communication, fertility has been presented as a matter of national survival and social renewal. In just a couple of years, Hungary went from being one of the countries spending the least on families in the OECD to being one of those spending the most.

Most prominently, the Family Protection Action Plan announced in 2019 included a combination of measures such as subsidized loans for young married couples, extended homeownership loans, and tax exemptions for mothers of multiple children. These policies were designed to incentivize marriage and childbirth within the context of a pronatalist agenda, often articulated in opposition to liberal views on reproductive rights, such as abortion. While these measures were framed as responses to Hungary's demographic crisis, their implementation has been criticized as reflecting a broader shift towards illiberal politics, seeking to reassert a patriarchal, ethnocentric vision of family and society. Poorer families have been disadvantaged by Hungary’s programmes during this era, specifically ethnic Roma families, though child poverty as a whole has seen a decrease.

== Current provisions ==
=== Marriage support ===
==== Marriage lump sum ====
The government introduced the discount for first married couples (Hungarian: első házasok kedvezménye): newly-married couples receive together 5,000 HUF per month for 24 months after marriage.

==== Housing support ====
Since 2015, the CSOK (családi otthonteremtési kedvezmény, transl. family housing benefit) can be utilized by married couples for used or newly-built houses and apartments if they promise to have one, two, three, or four children. The amount of support depends on the number of children that the couple plans to have. At least one of the parents must be under 40 years old. They also have to meet the following requirements: no criminal record and 180 days of social security payment before the request (in case of one or two children) or 2 years of social security payment (in case of 3 or more children). The children - who could be biological or adopted - have to live with the parents to fulfill the criteria. They can get CSOK as a fixed sum of money or as a preferential mortgage rate on housing. The sum can be calculated as follows:

Number of children	Buying new apartment or house Area	Buying new apartment or house Preferential mortgage rate	Buying used apartment or house Area	Buying used apartment or house Preferential mortgage rate
1 child	Minimum 40 m^{2} apartment or 70 m^{2} house	600,000 HUF	Minimum 40 m^{2} apartment or house	600,000 HUF
2 children	Minimum 50 m^{2} apartment or 80 m^{2} house	2,600,000 HUF	Minimum 50 m^{2} apartment or house	1,430,000 HUF
3 children	Minimum 60 m^{2} apartment or 90 m^{2} house	10,000,000 HUF + 10,000,000 HUF fix payment	Minimum 60 m^{2} apartment or house	2,200,000 HUF
4 or more children	Minimum 60 m^{2} apartment or 90 m^{2} house	10,000,000 HUF + 10,000,000 HUF fix payment	Minimum 70 m^{2} apartment or house	2,750,000 HUF

Families can also refund most of their taxes up to 5 million HUF that they pay for house and building material purchases. Finally, they need to pay only 5% in VAT instead of the standard 27% for most items.

=== Support for families with children ===
==== Support in salaries ====
The Orbán Government kept the already existing family allowance (Hungarian: családi pótlék) and further introduced the family tax benefit (Hungarian: családi adókedvezmény).

==== Tax benefits ====
Tax benefits depend on the number of children. As of 2024, the following is current. With one child, the taxable income will be reduced by 66,670 HUF per month. For two children, the taxable income will be reduced by 133,330 HUF per child per month. For three of more children, the tax base will be reduced by 220,000 per child per month. Further, mothers with four or more children are completely exempt from income taxes.

==== Transportation support ====
Families with three or more children receive a 2,500,000 HUF subsidy for the purchase of a seven seater car. Children may use public transport for free if they are accompanied by an adult and do not attend school yet. Pupils, students and undergraduates may use public transport at half price by showing their student card.

==== Maternity benefit ====
The amount of the maternity benefit is equal to the 225% of the minimum pension at the time of birth of the child (64,125 HUF in 2017); in case of twins, it is 300% (85,500 HUF in 2017). It is a one-time support.

==== Child care allowance ====
The child care allowance is paid monthly if the child has reached the age of 2. The amount is equal to 70% of either the mother or the father's salary up 140% of the current minimum wage, which was 138,000 HUF in 2018.

==== Free or reduced cost services for children ====
Several measures were introduced since 2010 that made services free or cheaper for families with children.

Vaccinations against the following diseases are free and obligatory in Hungary: tuberculosis, diphtheria, tetanus, pertussis, poliomyelitis, haemophilus influenzae, measles, mumps, rubella, hepatitis, streptococcus pneumoniae. The government made vaccinations for other diseases such as chicken pox, both types of meningitis and rotavirus free in 2018.

Children in the first nine years get free textbooks in school from 2017. Those in higher years but living in disadvantaged conditions, suffering from long-term illness, receiving child protection benefits, or living in a large family with three or more children are also entitled to free textbooks. However, the government plans to provide free textbooks for every pupils and students until the final exam.

Children who live in disadvantaged conditions, suffer from long-term illness, get child protection benefits, or live in a large family with three or more children also get free or half-priced meals in nurseries, kindergartens and schools. Meanwhile, others get them on reduced prices.

Those younger than 20 who will get a European driving license in Category B (motor vehicles) may both take a course on the KRESZ (similar to the British Highway Code) for free and try the test for the first time at no charge.

For those getting a successful language exam at the B2 or the C1 level, the price of the exam is refunded by the state if the examinee is under 35 years old.

==== Support for parents ====
Parents of one child have 2 days extra paid vacation. Parents of two children get 4 days. Parents of three or more children receive seven extra paid vacation days, compared to the average Hungarian.

=== Support for grandmothers ===
The Women 40 (Hungarian: Nők 40) program makes it possible for women who have worked 40 years to retire to get more time to spend with grandchildren or with their own parents.

=== Support of Hungarians outside of Hungary ===
==== Maternity benefit (outside of Hungary) ====
Maternity benefit is a one-off support to Hungarian mothers living abroad and amounts to 64,125 HUF per child. In the case of twins, the amount is 85,500 HUF together.

==== Baby bond (outside of Hungary) ====
Every Hungarian parent living outside of Hungary may have a 42,500 HUF account per child. The money stays in the bank and bears interest until the child reach the age of 18, When the person may get the final amount.

== Impact ==
=== Total fertility rate ===
View source data.

After initially being described as promising, yielding an increase in fertility rates from 2011 to 2016, the results of modern family policy in Hungary have since come to be viewed more divisively.

Although subsequent Hungarian governments have increased their spending on family support significantly, with direct payments, tax breaks, home loans and grants amounting to as much as 6.2% of GDP in some years, the fertility rate has only shown marginal improvements, with positive effects usually being limited to short time spans after the introduction of specific measures. Since 2022, Hungarian birth rates have once again been falling. Furthermore, even their minor increases have failed to stop Hungary's significant population decline, leading to speculation that the decline in births "appears to be driven primarily by macroeconomic factors and prevailing public sentiment" instead of natalist welfare policies. The slowing decrease of the population between 2016 and 2019 are mostly a consequence of the positive migration balance during that time.

Existing policies have further been criticized for perpetuating existing inequalities by offering comparatively more advantages to high-income families and being exclusionary, particularly towards non-traditional families.

Despite these issues, prominent conservative figures in other countries, such as Vice President of the United States J.D. Vance, have praised Hungarian family policy under Viktor Orbán and proposed adopting similar models.
