= Hungary–Russia relations =

- Hungary: Russia

Diplomatic mission
- Embassy of Hungary in Moscow: Embassy of Russia, Budapest

Hungary–Russia relations are the bilateral foreign relations between the two countries, Hungary and Russia. Hungary has an embassy in Moscow and two consulate-generals (in Saint Petersburg and Yekaterinburg). Russia has an embassy in Budapest and a consulate-general in Debrecen. Both countries are full members of the Organization for Security and Co-operation in Europe.

Hungary is highly dependent on sources of energy imported from Russia. In the context of the ongoing Russo-Ukrainian War, Viktor Orbán, Hungary's long-serving prime minister has been described as pro-Putin. Relations have deteriorated under prime minister Péter Magyar, who has pursued rapprochement with the European Union and Ukraine.

During the Second World War, the Soviet army occupied Hungary, and in 1948 the Soviet Union took full control of the country. It became part of the Warsaw Pact military alliance and the Comecon economic union. Relations between the two countries were strained in 1956 due to the Soviet military intervention in the revolution occurring in Hungary. Hungary expelled its communist government during the Revolutions of 1989, and diplomatic relations with Russia were restored after the breakup of the USSR in 1991.

== History ==
In the thirteenth century, a Hungarian Dominican friar named Julian traveled to the East in search of the ancestral home of the Hungarians.

During and following the Polish November Uprising of 1830–1831 against Russia, the counties and parliament of Hungary voiced their support for the Polish uprising.

The Hungarian Revolution of 1848 under Lajos Kossuth gained strong support across Hungary from 1848 to 1849. The young Austrian Emperor Franz Joseph appealed to Tsar Nicholas I for aid. He sent a large force that had been based in nearby Russian-controlled Congress Poland and it suppressed the revolt. However, the military intervention was unpopular among the ordinary soldiers and the liberal officers of the Russian army. It was sharply criticized by such democrats as Alexander Herzen and Nikolay Chernyshevsky.

Several hundred Hungarian volunteers fought alongside Poles in the January Uprising against Russia in 1863–1864, forming a large group among the foreign volunteers.

Budapest Convention of 1877 was a secret agreement between Austria-Hungary and Russia outlining Austria-Hungary’s neutrality and the division of influence in the Balkans in the event of a Russo-Turkish war. The secret convention allowed Russia to focus on military operations against the Ottoman Turks while ensuring Austria-Hungary’s neutrality. For Austria-Hungary, it prevented the creation of a powerful Slavic state that might inspire independence movements within its empire.

=== Hungary and the Soviet Union ===
Hungary was an ally of Germany during World War II. When Germany declared war on the Soviet Union in 1941, Hungary tried to remain neutral. When the controversial bombing of Kassa occurred, the government quickly declared the state of war existed between Hungary and the USSR, without receiving the consent of the Parliament.

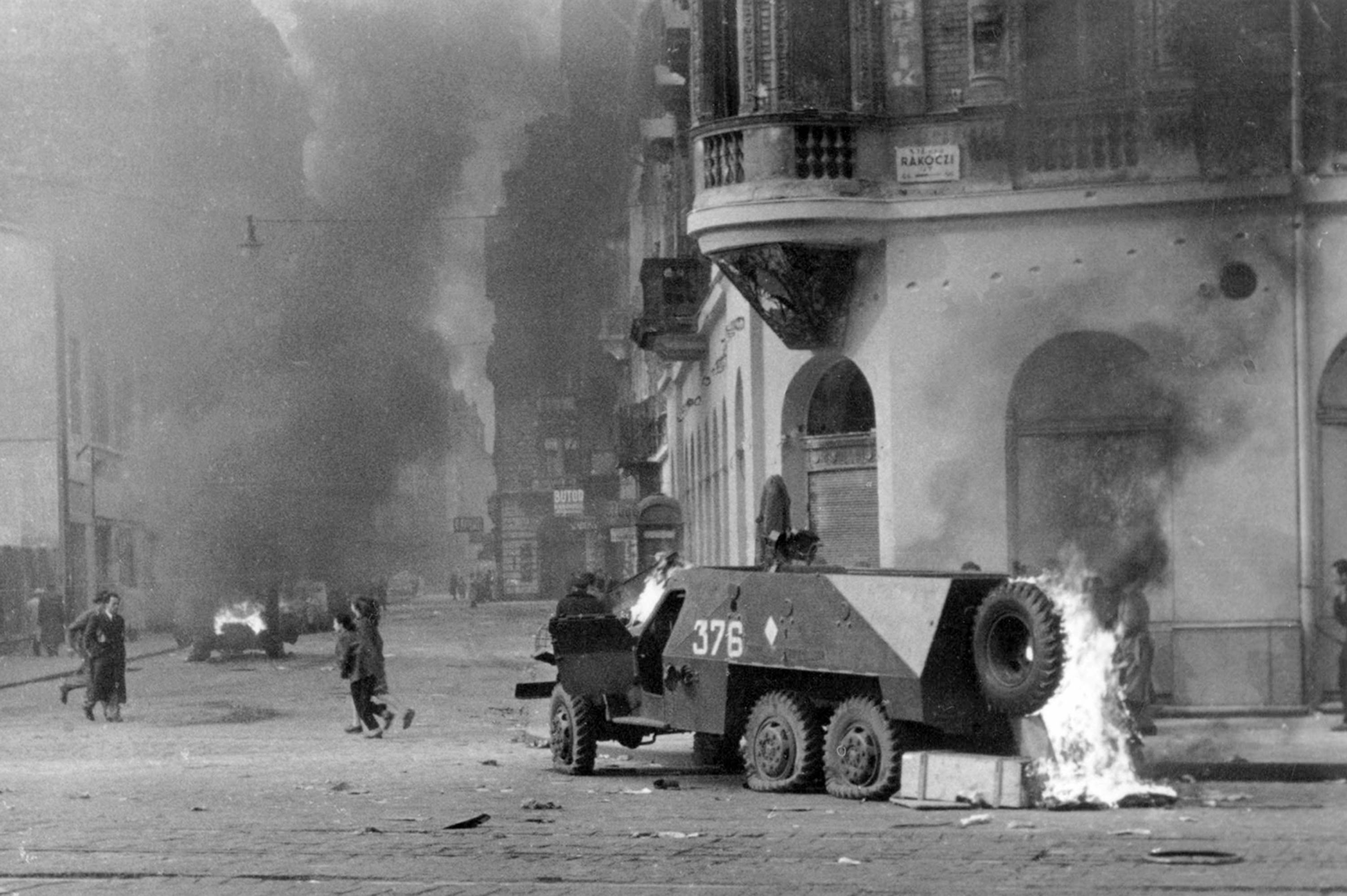
Hungarian Revolution of 1956

The Hungarian People's Republic (Magyar Népköztársaság) was the official state name of Hungary from 1949 to 1989 during its Communist period under the control of the Soviet Union. Following the Soviet occupation of Hungary after World War II, the Soviets set up a police system that persecuted all opposition through direct force and propaganda, hoping this would lead to a Communist victory in the elections of 1946. Despite these efforts, the Hungarian Communist Party came in third place in the elections, prompting the Soviets to directly impose a puppet government the following year. The next few years were spent consolidating power, using the ÁVH secret police to suppress political opposition through intimidation, false accusations, imprisonment and torture. The worst of the repression came under the rule of Mátyás Rákosi. At the height of his rule, Rákosi developed a strong cult of personality. Dubbed the "bald murderer", Rákosi imitated Stalinist political and economic programs, resulting in Hungary experiencing one of the harshest dictatorships in Europe. He described himself as "Stalin's best Hungarian disciple" and "Stalin's best pupil". After Khrushchev's "Secret Speech" denouncing Stalin's cult of personality, Rákosi was ultimately removed from power and replaced by the reformist Imre Nagy, who attempted to take Hungary out of the Soviet bloc. This led to the Hungarian Revolution of 1956, which was brutally crushed by the Soviets. Following the failed revolution, the Soviets instituted János Kádár as the leader of Hungary. After an initial period of repressions against the revolutionaries, Kádár implemented a more moderate form of communism, which he referred to as "Goulash Communism." He would rule until 1988, when he was removed from power just before the "revolution" that ended Communism in Hungary.

=== Hungary and the Russian Federation ===
==== 1991–2002 ====
After 1991, Hungarian-Russian relations improved, but within the context of Hungary's increasing commitment to Euro-Atlantic integration. Hungary participated in NATO's Partnership for Peace from 1994 under Prime Minister Gyula Horn, becoming a full member in 1999, during Viktor Orbán's first term as prime minister.

In 1994, during the Boross Government Hungary and Russia signed an agreement about the handling of international debt between the Soviet Union and Hungary. In 1995, during the Horn Government, the leaders of the two countries met again to monitor the ratification of previous agreements and to sign an agreement about boosting bilateral foreign investment. No further major meetings took place between the leaders of Russia and Hungary until the Medgyessy Government.

In 2000, during Viktor Orbán's first term as Prime Minister of Hungary, the country left the International Investment Bank, citing a lack of transparency.

==== Medgyessy–Gyurcsány era (2002–2009) ====
During the Medgyessy Government (2002–2004) and the governments of Prime Minister Ferenc Gyurcsány (First Gyurcsány Government, 2004–2006; Second Gyurcsány Government 2006–2009) relations continued to improve, and leaders of Hungary and Russia met several times, renewing their commitment to economic collaboration, especially in the energy sector.

In 2005, Prime Minister Ferenc Gyurcsány and Prime Minister Mikhail Fradkov signed an agreement of economic cooperation in Moscow. In the same visit, Ferenc Gyurcsány also met with President Vladimir Putin. During this meeting, Putin promised Russia will return artifacts looted during World War II to Hungary. In 2006, Russia passed a law allowing the return of said stolen artifacts to Hungary. In the same year, 2006, Vladimir Putin and Sergey Lavrov visited Hungary. Putin paid his respects at a memorial of the 1956 uprising, said that Russia is not responsible for the atrocities. On this visit, Putin personally returned the looted artifacts as previously agreed.

In his 2007 Munich speech, Vladimir Putin heavily criticized the United States and said that Russia will not tolerate Western dominance. In this period, Russia's foreign policy started to be monitored with more suspicion in the United States, and US ambassador April H. Foley was keen to know where Hungary was going to stand. She met with Prime Minister Ferenc Gyurcsány to talk about her concerns about Hungary getting too close with Russia. In their conversation Ferenc Gyurcsány claimed he was not aware of declining relations between the United States, and according to Foley's report, he got defensive about his relationship with Russia. Following this meeting, US ambassador April H. Foley also met with Viktor Orbán who was then the leader of the opposition in Hungary. In 2007, Orbán was publicly critical of Russia and Foley felt reassured that Orbán has a strong commitment to Euro-Atlantic integration and is strongly anti-Russian.

During the year 2007, relations between Western nations and Russia continued to deteriorate. Estonia removed a Soviet monument which angered the local Russian minority and the Russian government, causing violent clashes between police and protesters in Estonia and the blockade of the Estonian embassy in Moscow. Later in the same year, a Finno-Ugric conference was held in Udmurtia, home to a Finno-Ugric minority in Russia. President Vladimir Putin invited the governments of Hungary and Finland, both independent nations speaking Finno-Ugric languages, however high-ranking members of the third independent Finno-Ugric-speaking nation, Estonia were not invited due to the incident involving the Soviet monument in Estonia. Viktor Orbán, then the leader of the opposition urged the prime minister to decline Putin's invitation, citing that Russia's goal is to use the conference to isolate Estonia. In the end, both Hungarian prime minister Ferenc Gyurcsány and Finnish president Tarja Halonen attended the conference. Negative perception of this move was widespread, and Ferenc Gyurcsány attempted to control the damage by signalling commitment to the Euro-Atlantic community.

==== Orbán era (2010–2026) ====
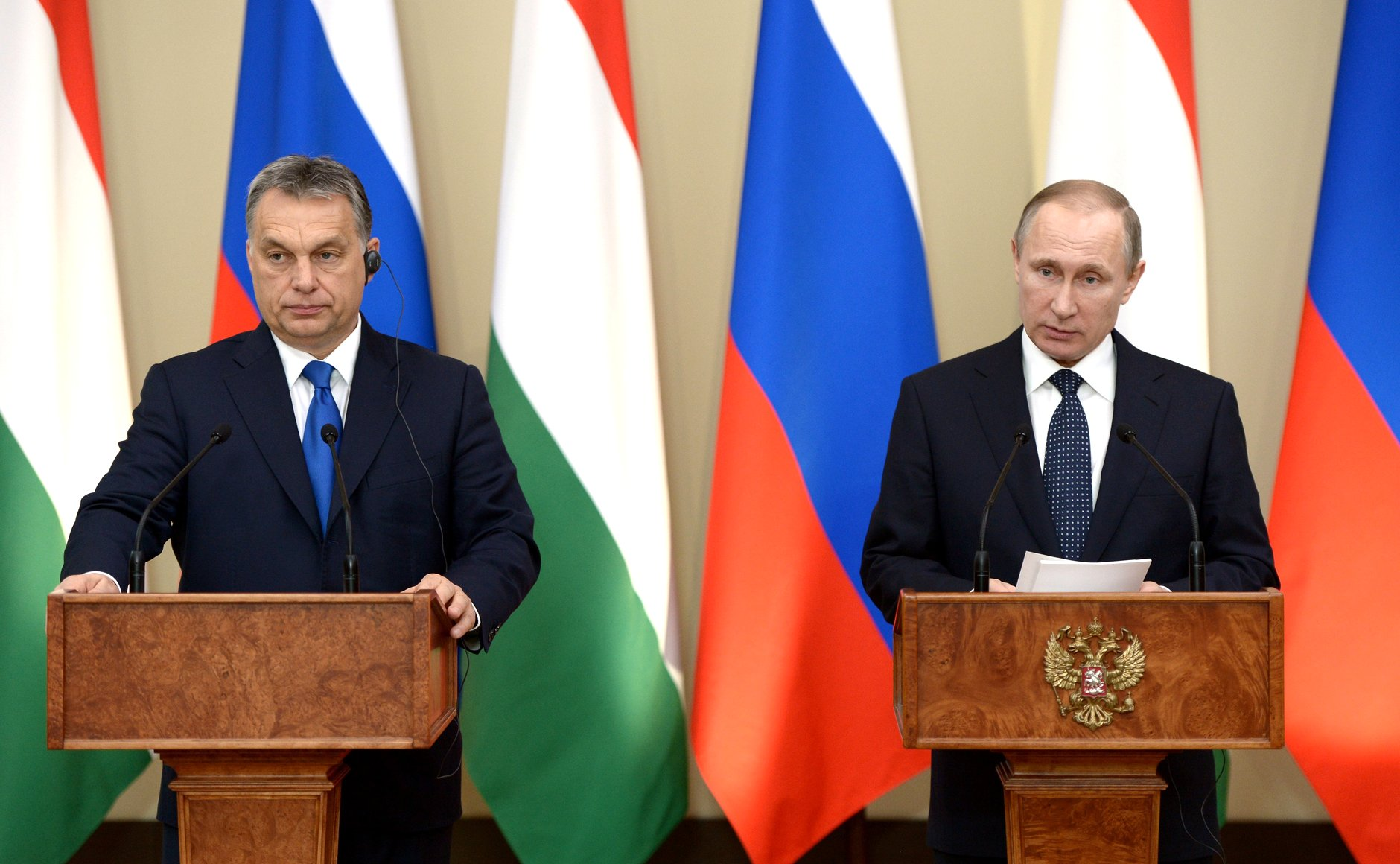
Orbán with Vladimir Putin in February 2016

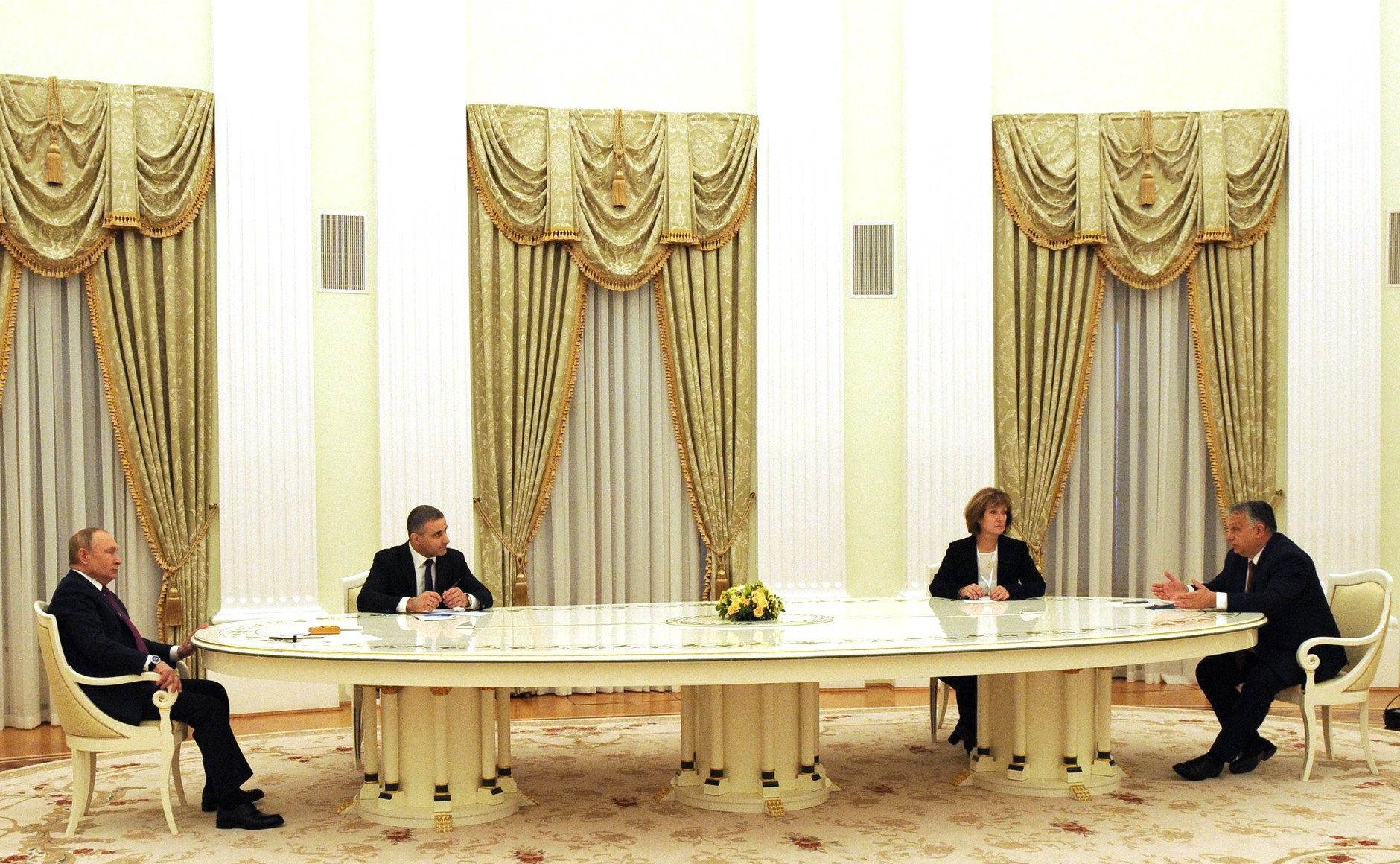
Russian president Vladimir Putin with Viktor Orbán in the Kremlin on 1 February 2022

Historically Orbán was staunchly anti-Russian. He strongly criticized Ferenc Gyurcsány's foreign policy that he perceived as too pro-Russian. In 2007 he said that Hungary should use protectionist policies against countries like China and Russia, because while they are capitalist countries, they are still authoritarian. According to some reports, Orbán's views on geopolitics started to change due to the 2008 financial crisis because he perceived that the United States's dominant status in global politics is not going to last, and a multipolar world will become the norm, with Russia and China rivaling the United States' on the global stage. After his shift away from his previously strong anti-Russian views, Orbán often mentioned the importance of powerful "Eastern countries", and in a 2024 speech he declared that a new world order is unfolding.

In 2010 Prime Minister Viktor Orbán announced his foreign relations plan, the "Eastern Opening Policy." Created in opposition to Hungary's western alliances such as the European Union (EU) and NATO, the Eastern Opening plan heavily prioritized Russia as a viable ally, and efforts were taken to secure that tight relationship throughout 2013–2014. One major proof of this is the bilateral agreement between the two nations over the Paks Nuclear Power Plant in Hungary, which called into the question the risk of Hungary becoming financially dependent on Russia for more than a few decades.

Following the Russian military intervention in Ukraine in 2014, Prime Minister Viktor Orbán rejected imposing sanctions on Russia despite EU pressure. This has led to officials in the EU and NATO to accuse Hungary of being a "Trojan Horse", acting ultimately in the interests of Russia.

In 2015 and 2017, Vladimir Putin visited Budapest to meet with Orbán to discuss bilateral ties.

In May 2019, concerned over close Hungarian relations with China and Russia, the Trump administration hosted Orbán in Washington, D.C., raising criticism from the EU and UN.

On 21 January 2021, Hungary became the first European Union member state to approve the Russian Sputnik V COVID-19 vaccine.

In July 2021, Hungarian delegates to the Parliamentary Assembly of the Council of Europe (PACE) joined with Russia to protest Ukraine's "Indigenous law", which fails to mention Russians as "Indigenous" to Ukraine.

Following the outbreak of the Russian invasion of Ukraine, Hungary, as an EU member state, imposed minor sanctions on Russia, while Russia subsequently added all EU countries to its "Unfriendly Countries List". On 8 March, Hungary opposed imposing outright energy embargoes on Russia. Despite the issues, Hungary remained mostly neutral to the conflict, although it opposed harsh sanctions especially in the oil sector.

Orbán, speaking at a meeting of the Hungarian governing party Fidesz in Balatonalmádi in September 2022, identified EU sanctions and restrictive measures against Russia as major causes for the ongoing inflation surge and 'global economic war', and called for the lifting of EU sanctions by the end of the year.

On 12 March 2024, Rosatom CEO Alexey Likhachev paid a visit to the Paks II Nuclear Power Plant, an expansion of the existing plant 100 km south of Budapest on the Danube river. As of 2024, Russia provided roughly 75% of Hungary's natural gas, between 60 and 80% of its oil and all of its nuclear fuel.

===== "Silent expulsions" of diplomats =====
In April 2018, Sergei and Yulia Skripal were poisoned in the United Kingdom. As a response to government involvement in the attack, several countries expelled a total of 342 Russian diplomats. In April 2018, one Hungarian embassy staffer was expelled from Russia. Investigative journalists later revealed that Orbán's government coordinated the expulsion of the Russian diplomat with the Russian government: they chose to formally expel a diplomat who has already finished their mission and was preparing to return to Russia.

After the Skripal incident, Orbán's government had not formally expelled any Russian diplomats, even when serious abuses of diplomatic immunity were found. The authorities did, however, ask the diplomats to leave the country without striking a formal diplomatic incident, thus limiting the damage done to bilateral relations between Russia and Hungary. In one incident, Hungarian authorities became aware that GRU agents - enjoying diplomatic immunity - trained Hungarian Neo-Nazi paramilitary organization Hungarian National Front in mock combat as many as 5 times a year. Secret service was aware of the collaboration between the paramilitary organization and the Russian state agents, but could not take action because the mock combat activities did not violate any laws. The events escalated when police obtained a search warrant under the suspicion that the leader of the organization, István Győrkös, was in possession of firearms illegally. When police attempted to execute the search warrant, István Győrkös shot and killed an officer. Following the events, police executed 13 additional search warrants and indicted 17 individuals. Several members of the organization were later convicted because of illegal possession of a large quantity of weapons and ammunition. The GRU members involved in training with the group returned home after being informally asked to do so, without escalating a formal diplomatic incident between Russia and Hungary.

==== Magyar era (2026–) ====
Relations have deteriorated under prime minister Péter Magyar, who has pursued rapprochement with the European Union and Ukraine. On 8 September 2026, Hungary expelled 10 Russian diplomats, with foreign minister Anita Orbán saying they "were engaged in activities in Hungary ‌that are unacceptable for diplomats under the Vienna Convention".

== Russian media influence in Hungary ==
In 2012, István Győrkös launched Hídfő, an online newspaper. István Győrkös's father, also named István Győrkös is the leader of the Neo-nazi paramilitary organization Hungarian National Front. The header of the website itself declared it the official website of the Hungarian National Front. The content of the website has been described as Pro-Russian, and the Facebook post announcing the creation of the website was written in Cyrillic script. It is one of the few websites in Hungary offering Vkontakte integration.

Notably, during the Russian Invasion of Ukraine (2014) Hídfő published an article falsely accusing Hungary of arming Ukraine. The government of Russia publicly accused Hungary, citing this article. Hungary's secret service was aware of the connection between Russian state agents and Hídfő's owner - a Neo-nazi organization called Hungarian National Front, but this only became known to the public when the organization's leader was arrested for killing a policeman. The website originally used the generic .net Top-level domain, but later switched to .ru. Linguistic analysis in a study by Corruption Research Center Budapest (CRBC) later showed that the content on Hídfő shows strong signs of being translated from Russian, because it shows syntactical constructions that are statistically common in Russian text, but statistically rare in Hungarian text.

By 2014, the daily readership of Hídfő was in the low thousands, which would not make it a major newspaper by Hungarian standards with 40 websites in Hungary achieving daily readership over a hundred thousand. Despite low readership, there are certain factors potentially augmenting the real impact of Hídfő.net. A study by Corruption Research Center Budapest (CRCB) used statistical analysis of articles connected to divisive political issues. This study found, that several newspapers that are connected to, or can be described as supporting of Viktor Orbán's politics had content very similar to that of Hídfő. On the divisive issues that Hídfő liked to cover, 888.hu (then indirectly financed by the government, now part of Origo (website)) offered coverage that was nearly identical to Hídfő. The pro-Orbán website Origo itself showed resemblance to Hídfő when compared to other major websites. The combined readership of these websites is not negligible: in 2020, origo.hu was the second most popular website in Hungary. It was also revealed that one of the most shared Hungarian websites on Facebook, Mindenegyben.com also covers divisible political issues using discourse nearly identical to Russian propaganda, even though their content is generally apolitical.

In 2024, two Russian nationals were indicted by the United States Department of Justice due to alleged crimes in connection with their founding of the Russian disinformation network Tenet media. Tenet media had connections to Hungary: according to the indictment, part of the illicit funds were funneled to Tenet Media through a Hungarian company, albeit the company is not named in the indictment, and the nature of their involvement - if any - beyond the money-laundering activities is not known. Lauren Chen, the owner of Tenet media was known in pro-Orbán media circles and gave an exclusive interview to Pesti Srácok. She also visited Hungary after being invited to a conservative event organized by Mathias Corvinus Collegium. Many of the influencers hired by Tenet media, such as Dave Rubin, Lauren Southern and Benny Johnson (columnist) were also featured in Hungarian media or visited Hungary to speak at events In a similar case - also in 2024 - Czech authorities discovered that the media network Voice of Europe was created by Russia to manipulate European Union politics and that several politicians in Europe were paid hundreds of thousands of Euros in connection to Voice of Europe. Voice of Europe was frequently used as a source in pro-Orbán media. Newspapers reported that Hungarian politicians might have been among those paid to spread Russian disinformation. Voice of Europe used a speech by Hungarian politician László Toroczkai to suggest that Hungary might claim Ukrainian territory. Later László Toroczkai gave an interview to the outlet covering his position on the Russo-Ukrainian War.

== Resident diplomatic missions ==
- Hungary has an embassy in Moscow and consulates-general in Kazan, Saint Petersburg and Yekaterinburg.
- Russia has an embassy in Budapest and a consulate-general in Debrecen.

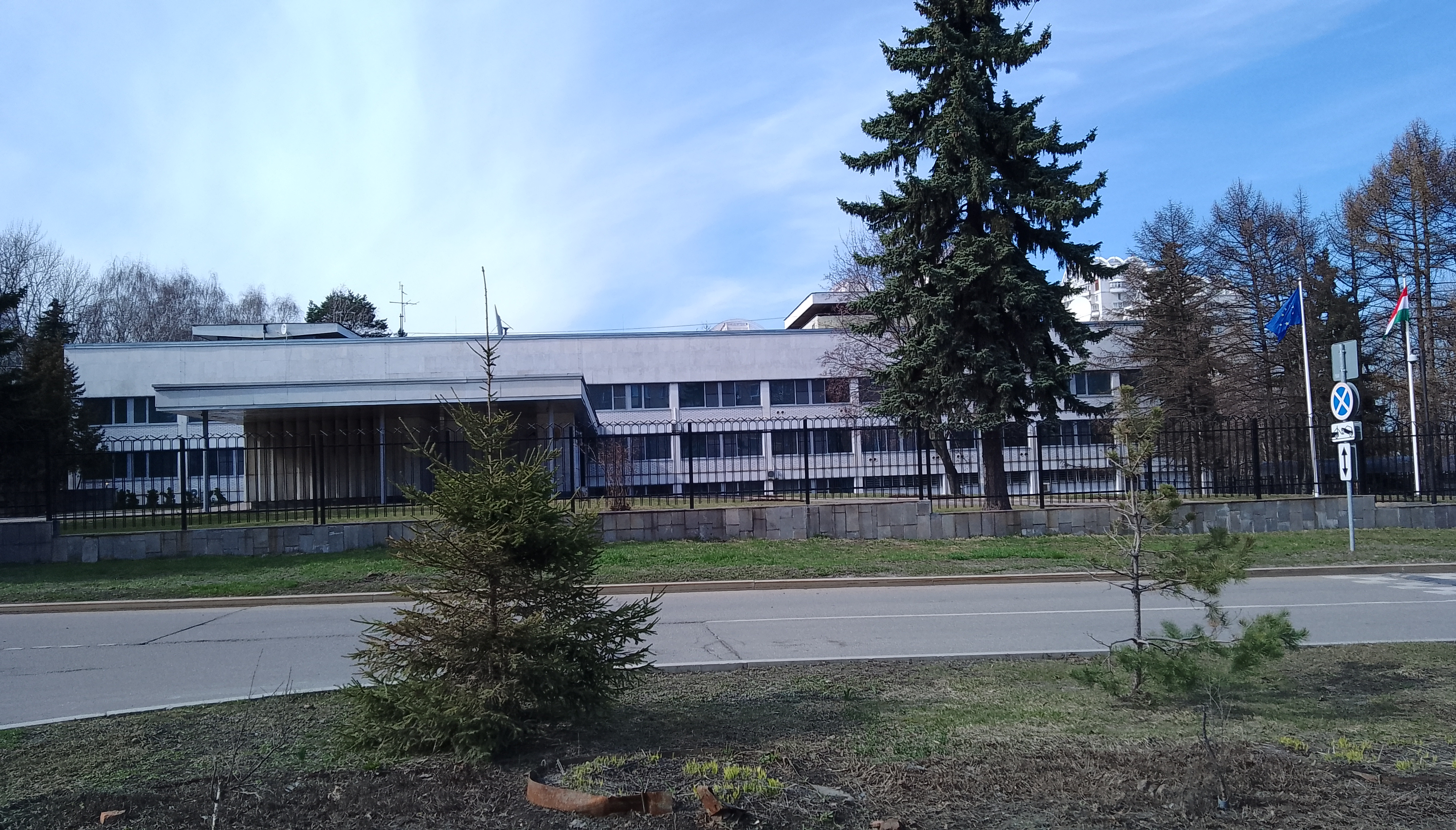
Embassy of Hungary in Moscow

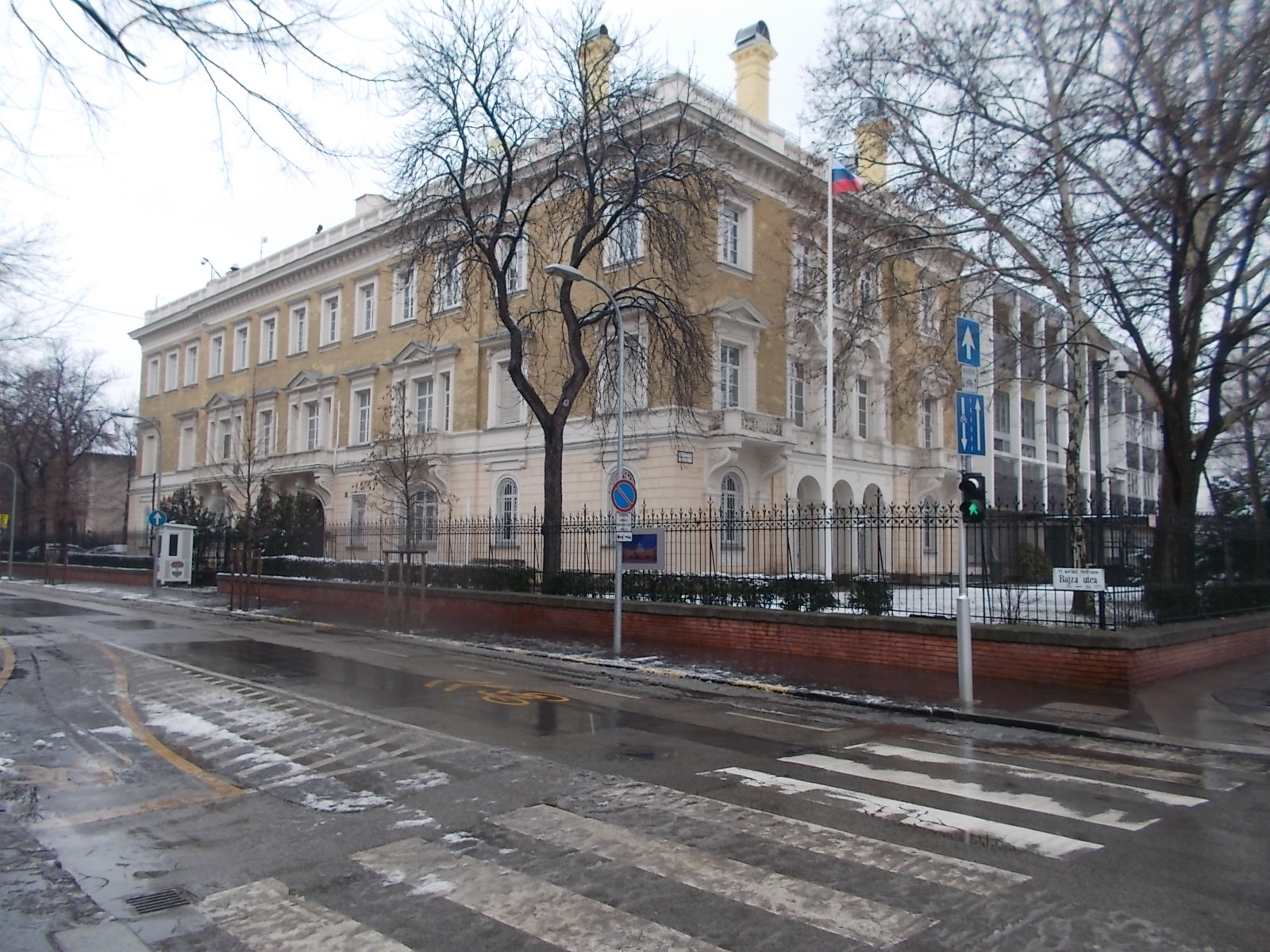
Embassy of Russia in Budapest

== See also ==
- Hungary–Soviet Union relations
- Foreign relations of Hungary
- Foreign relations of Russia
- György Gilyán
- Russia–European Union relations
- List of ambassadors of Russia to Hungary
- Hungarians in Russia
- Russians in Hungary
