= Imre Szabó =

Hungarian politician

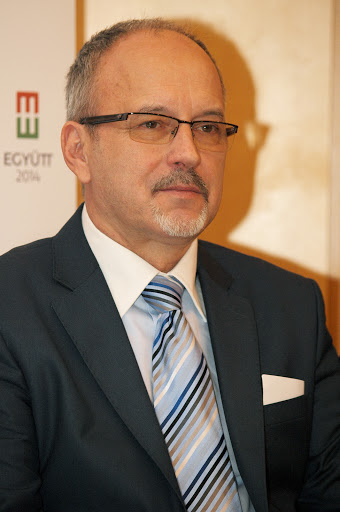
- Imre Szabó in December 2013

Minister of Environment and Water
- In office 5 May 2008 – 29 May 2010
- Prime Minister: Ferenc Gyurcsány; Gordon Bajnai
- Preceded by: Gábor Fodor
- Succeeded by: László Gajdos (2026; as Minister of the Living Environment)

Member of the National Assembly
- In office 18 June 1998 – 5 May 2014

Personal details
- Born: 1 April 1953 (age 73) Esztergom, Hungary
- Party: MSZMP (1977–1989); MSZP (since 1992)
- Other political affiliations: KISZ
- Children: 6 (1 died)
- Profession: Politician

Imre Szabó (born 1 April 1953) is a Hungarian politician, who served as Minister of Environment and Water between 2008 and 2010. He was also a member of the National Assembly (MP) from 1998 to 2014.

== Youth and sports movements ==
Szabó was born in Esztergom on 1 April 1953. He finished his secondary studies at the Dobó Katalin Secondary Grammar School at his birthplace in 1971. After graduating from the Teacher Training College in 1977, he obtained a degree in physical education at the Gyula Juhász Teacher Training College in Szeged, and at the same time a degree in football coaching at the College of Physical Education. He worked as a primary school teacher in Sárisáp and Tokodaltáró between 1975 and 1980, then as a physical education teacher and football coach in Szentendre between 1980 and 1983. He was also involved in the local pioneer movement.

He joined Hungarian Socialist Workers' Party (MSZMP) in 1977. He was also a member of Hungarian Young Communist League (KISZ). Between 1983 and 1987, he was responsible for sports, camping, tourism, and environmental and nature conservation at the National Center of the Hungarian Pioneers' Association. He served as head of department of the State Office of Youth and Sports (ÁISH) from 1 March to 27 November 1987. Between 1989 and 1991, he was also chairman of the National Tourism Council's youth committee. He served as Secretary-General of the Hungarian Hikers' Association (MTSZ) from 1987 to 2003. He served as national president of the organization between February 2007 and May 2012. He was replaced by businessman István Garancsi.

== Political career ==
During the transition to democracy in 1989–90, Szabó was an organizer of the National Council of Hungarian Youth Organizations (MISZOT). He joined the Hungarian Socialist Party (MSZP) in 1992. He presided the party's local branch in Szentendre between 1994 and 1995. He was elected to the local representative body of Szentendre in the 1994 municipal elections. He became chairman of his party's Pest County branch in 1995. He retained this position until 2008. He was the head of the environmental department of the MSZP between 1996 and 2002.

Szabó obtained parliamentary mandate from his party's regional list of Pest County each 1998, 2002, 2006 and 2010 parliamentary elections. He was a member of the Committee on the Environment and Youth and Sports Committee from 1998 to 2000, the chairman of the latter committee between 2000 and 2002. After the 2002 national election, he briefly served as president of the Committee of Social Organizations from May to November 2002, then a member until 2006. Beside that, after he was elected during the 2002 local elections, he also served as President of the General Assembly of Pest County between 2002 and 2006. At the same time, he became the chairman of the Pest County Regional Development Council and the Central Hungary Regional Development Council. After the 2006 parliamentary election, he worked as a member of the Committee on the Environment from 2006 to 2008.

After the formation of minority government of Prime Minister Ferenc Gyurcsány, when the Alliance of Free Democrats (SZDSZ) quit the coalition agreement, Szabó was appointed Minister of Environment and Water in May 2008. He retained his position in the cabinet of Gordon Bajnai too, until 29 May 2010. Following the 2010 parliamentary election, Szabó was a member of the Committee on Sustainable Development in the 2010–2014 parliamentary term, serving its vice-chairman between 2011 and 2014. He was also chairman of the Subcommittee on Forestry from 2010 to 2014.

== Personal life ==
Szabó married three times. His third wife is Krisztina Szabó (born 1979), who worked as a jurist beside the MSZP parliamentary group and was personal assistant of fellow Socialist politician József Tóbiás. His marriages produced altogether six children. One of his sons, the fifteen-year-old Barnabás died in a car accident in Szentendre on 11 August 2008.

Political offices
Preceded by Gábor Fodor	Minister of Environment and Water; 2008–2010	Succeeded by position abolished
