= Zoltan Torey =

Hungarian-Australian psychologist and writer

Zoltan Torey (21 November 1929 - 2014) was a Hungarian-Australian psychologist, writer and philosopher. He is known for his theories on consciousness. He left Hungary when he was 18 years old and came to Australia in 1949. Later he became blind in an industrial accident and forced to leave his studies to become a dentist. Next phase of his life started after earning a degree in Clinical Psychology. He not only worked as a practitioner in Clinical Psychology but also wrote three books; one of them more autobiographical and the others on what is known as hard problem in philosophy.

== Early life ==
Zoltan was the only child of Zoltan Torey and Jolan Szabo, an upper middle-class family from Budapest. and had grown up in a privileged environment among intellectuals. The Russian Army came to Budapest around December 1944 and in the following year, Hungary came under the Soviet occupation. Zoltan, the senior was arrested under the guise of him being a liberal subversive and a bleak life befell the family. After his matriculation in 1948, in the face of not getting a university place for hailing from a bourgeois background, he left Hungary with three other youth by crossing Austro-Hungarian border. The 19-year old Zoltan landed in Melbourne, Australia on 17 July 1949.

== Life in Australia ==
After arriving in Australia, he was admitted to a degree course in dentistry at University of Sydney in the following year and also started to work part-time at several jobs. In 1951, while he was loosening the plug in a vat of acid at the plant he was working, he was sprayed in an accident, with battery acid causing blindness, damage to his throat and fusion of vocal cords. This accident also made his voice a whisper. While still in the hospital he married his first wife and later left for France in the hope of getting a corneal graft done. After dashing the hope for vision, he came back to Australia with his wife and graduated with Bachelor of Arts degrees in psychology and philosophy at the turn of 1960s.

After his accident, contrary to the advice he received to use his auditory faculties, he trained himself to visualise his surrounds. He became so adept at visual imagery he could replace roof-guttering of his multi-gabled house single-handedly, even at night, to the horror of his neighbours.

== Personal life ==
Torey’s first marriage ended in 1986, and he remarried Dawn Emerton in 1989. They have a son.

== Books authoured by Zoltan Torey ==
The first book Torey wrote was The Crucible of Consciousness published in 1999 an edited version of which titled The Crucible of Consciousness: An Integrated Theory of Mind and Brain was later published by the MIT Press with a foreword by the American Philosopher, Daniel Dennett. A friend of his read and recorded the information used in the book over a twenty year-period.

He published his second book Out of Darkness in 2003 on the suggestion from the British neurologist Oliver Sacks to document how the blindness changed his life and how he dealt with it. When he died, he had completed final checks on the manuscript of his last book The Conscious Mind, a book for the non-specialist on the mind-body problem, that was published by MIT Press in 2014

== See also ==
- Daniel Dennett
- Oliver Sacks
- Consciousness
- Hungary–Russia relations
