= Orbán government =

Premiership of Viktor Orbán or Orbán government may refer to:

- First premiership of Viktor Orbán (1998–2002)
- Second premiership of Viktor Orbán (2010–2026)

Individual government terms:

- First Orbán government, 1998–2002
- Second Orbán government, 2010–2014
- Third Orbán government, 2014–2018
- Fourth Orbán government, 2018–2022
- Fifth Orbán government, 2022–2026
