= Government of Hungary =

- Magyarország kormánya
- State government
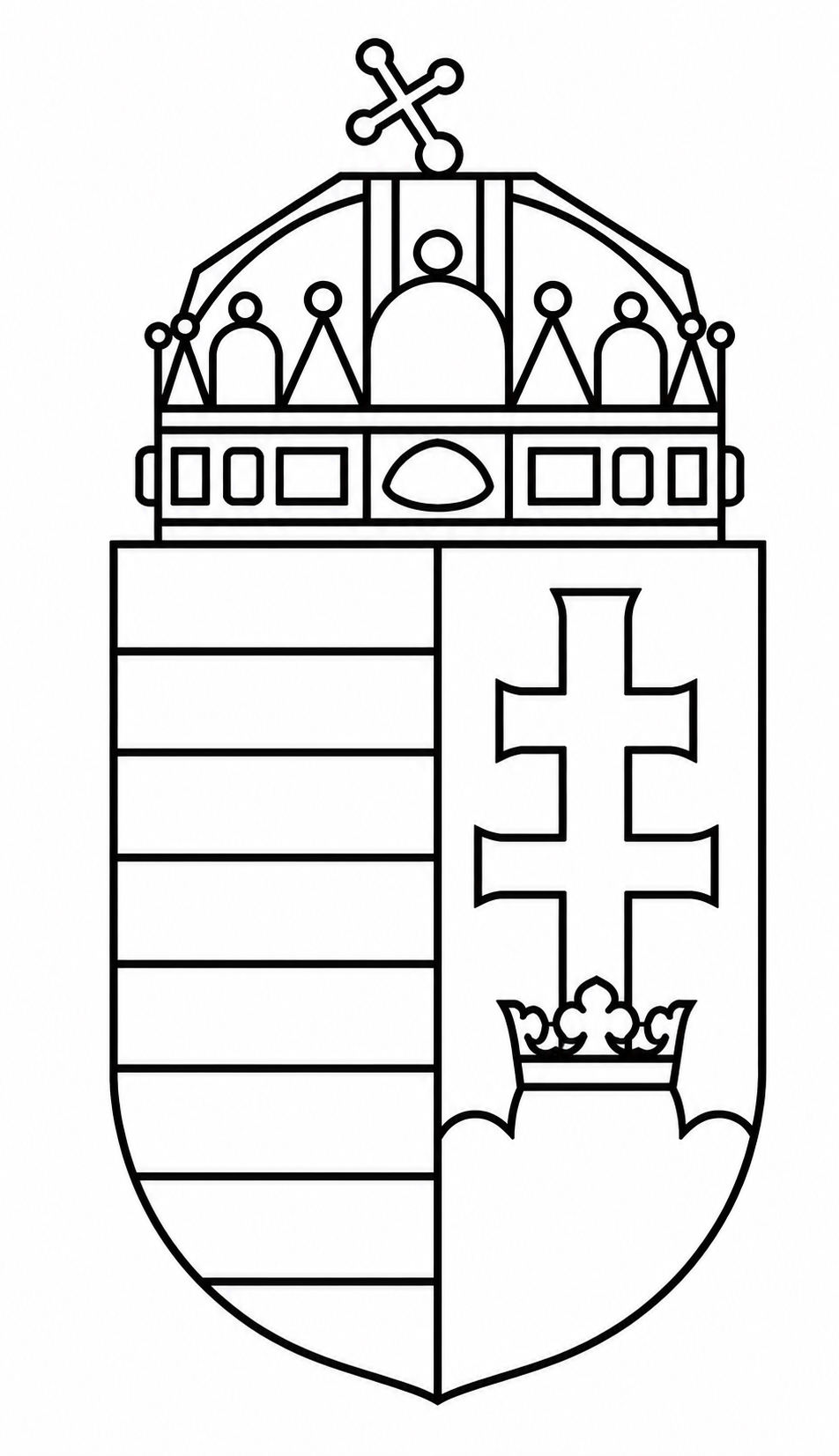
- Logo of the Hungarian Government

Overview
- Established: 28 March 1848
- State: Hungary
- Leader: Prime Minister
- Leader Name: Péter Magyar
- Appointed by: President
- Ministries: 16
- Responsible to: National Assembly
- Website: kormany.hu

The Government of Hungary (Hungarian: Magyarország Kormánya) exercises executive power in Hungary. It is led by the Prime Minister, and is composed of various ministers. It is the principal organ of public administration. The Prime Minister (miniszterelnök) is elected by the National Assembly and serves as the head of government and the country's political leader. The Prime Minister is the leader of the party with the most seats in parliament. The Prime Minister selects Cabinet ministers and has the exclusive right to dismiss them. Cabinet nominees must appear before consultative open hearings before one or more parliamentary committees, survive a vote in the National Assembly, and be formally approved by the President. The cabinet is responsible to the parliament.

The Government's role is greatly enhanced compared to cabinets in other parliamentary republics. Since the adoption of the current constitution, the Government is explicitly defined as the country's executive authority. In most other parliamentary republics, the president is at least nominal chief executive.

Since the fall of communism, Hungary has had a multi-party system. A new Hungarian parliament was elected on 8 April 2018. This parliamentary election was the 8th since the 1990 first multi-party election. The result was a victory for Fidesz–KDNP alliance, preserving its two-thirds majority with Viktor Orbán remaining Prime Minister. It was the second election according to the new Constitution of Hungary which went into force on 1 January 2012. The new electoral law also entered into force that day. The voters elected 199 MPs instead of previous 386 lawmakers.

As of 2023, there have been increasing concerns over the commitment of the Hungarian government towards democratic values. Freedom House and the European Parliament have claimed that Hungary is no longer a fully democratic country. During his tenure, Prime Minister Viktor Orbán and his leading politicians openly used racist arguments, making the normalization of right-wing extremism a valid concern in case of Hungary. Voicing hate speech or discriminatory language against marginalized groups, including but not limited to those based on race, religion, or sexual orientation, especially when presented in a humorous context, is often socially accepted in Hungary.

List of cabinets since 1989:

Governments of Hungary
| Name of Government | Duration of Government | Prime minister | Parties Involved |
|---|---|---|---|
| Németh | November 24, 1988 – May 23, 1990 | Miklós Németh (MSZP) | MSZP |
| Antall | May 23, 1990 – December 12, 1993 | József Antall (MDF) | MDF, FKgP, KDNP |
| Boross | December 12, 1993 – December 21, 1993 | Péter Boross (MDF) | MDF, EKgP, KDNP |
| Boross | December 21, 1993 – July 15, 1994 | Péter Boross (MDF) | MDF, EKgP, KDNP |
| Horn | July 15, 1994 – July 6, 1998 | Gyula Horn (MSZP) | MSZP, SZDSZ |
| Orbán I | July 6, 1998 – May 27, 2002 | Viktor Orbán (Fidesz) | Fidesz, FKgP, MDF |
| Medgyessy | May 27, 2002 – September 29, 2004 | Péter Medgyessy (Ind.) | MSZP, SZDSZ |
| Gyurcsány I | September 29, 2004 – June 9, 2006 | Ferenc Gyurcsány (MSZP) | MSZP, SZDSZ |
| Gyurcsány II | June 9, 2006 – April 14, 2009 | Ferenc Gyurcsány (MSZP) | MSZP, SZDSZ |
| Bajnai | April 14, 2009 – May 29, 2010 | Gordon Bajnai (Ind.) | MSZP |
| Orbán II | May 29, 2010 – June 6, 2014 | Viktor Orbán (Fidesz) | Fidesz, KDNP |
| Orbán III | June 6, 2014 – May 18, 2018 | Viktor Orbán (Fidesz) | Fidesz, KDNP |
| Orbán IV | May 18, 2018 – May 24, 2022 | Viktor Orbán (Fidesz) | Fidesz, KDNP |
| Orbán V | May 24, 2022 – May 9, 2026 | Viktor Orbán (Fidesz) | Fidesz, KDNP |
| Magyar | May 9, 2026 – present | Péter Magyar (TISZA) | TISZA |
Notes
| Traditional colours | | | |
| Hungarian Socialist Party (Magyar Szocialista Párt, MSZP) | | | |
| Hungarian Democratic Forum (Magyar Demokrata Fórum, MDF) | | | |
| Independent Smallholders, Agrarian Workers and Civic Party (Független Kisgazda-, Földmunkás- és Polgári Párt, FKgP); United Smallholders' Party (Egyesült Történelmi Kisgazda és Polgári Párt, EKgP) | | | |
| Christian Democratic People's Party (Kereszténydemokrata Néppárt, KDNP) | | | |
| Alliance of Free Democrats (Szabad Demokraták Szövetsége, SZDSZ) | | | |
| Fidesz – Hungarian Civic Alliance (Fidesz – Magyar Polgári Szövetség, Fidesz) | | | |
| Respect and Freedom Party (Tisztelet és Szabadság Párt, TISZA) | | | |

== Current government ==
Following the 2026 Hungarian parliamentary election, the current prime minister, Péter Magyar is serving with a caretaker government, consisting of himself and the ministers of the Fifth Orbán Government. His government is planned to be inaugurated on 12 May 2026, consisting of the ministers in the table below.

| Office | Name | Party | Term |
Prime Minister's Office
| Prime Minister | Péter Magyar | TISZA | 2026–present |
| Deputy Prime Minister | Anita Orbán | TISZA | 2026–present |
| Minister of the Prime Minister's Office | Bálint Ruff | Independent | 2026–present |
Cabinet Ministers
| Minister of Interior | Gábor Pósfai | TISZA | 2026–present |
| Minister of Foreign Affairs | Anita Orbán | TISZA | 2026–present |
| Minister of Finance | András Kármán | TISZA | 2026–present |
| Minister of Economy and Energy | István Kapitány | TISZA | 2026–present |
| Minister of Justice | Márta Görög | Independent | 2026–present |
| Minister of Children and Education | Judit Lannert | Independent | 2026–present |
| Minister of Health | Zsolt Hegedűs | TISZA | 2026–present |
| Minister of Defense | Romulusz Ruszin-Szendi | TISZA | 2026–present |
| Minister of the Living Environment | László Gajdos | TISZA | 2026–present |
| Minister of Agriculture and Food Industry | Szabolcs Bóna | TISZA | 2026–present |
| Minister of Transport and Investment | Dávid Vitézy | Independent | 2026–present |
| Minister of Social and Family Affairs | Vilmos Kátai-Németh | TISZA | 2026–present |
| Minister of Social Relations and Culture | Zoltán Tarr | TISZA | 2026–present |
| Minister of Regional and Rural Development | Viktória Lőrincz | TISZA | 2026–present |
| Minister of Science and Technology | Zoltán Tanács | TISZA | 2026–present |

== Government history, since 1990 ==
=== Minister of the Interior ===
Gábor Pósfai

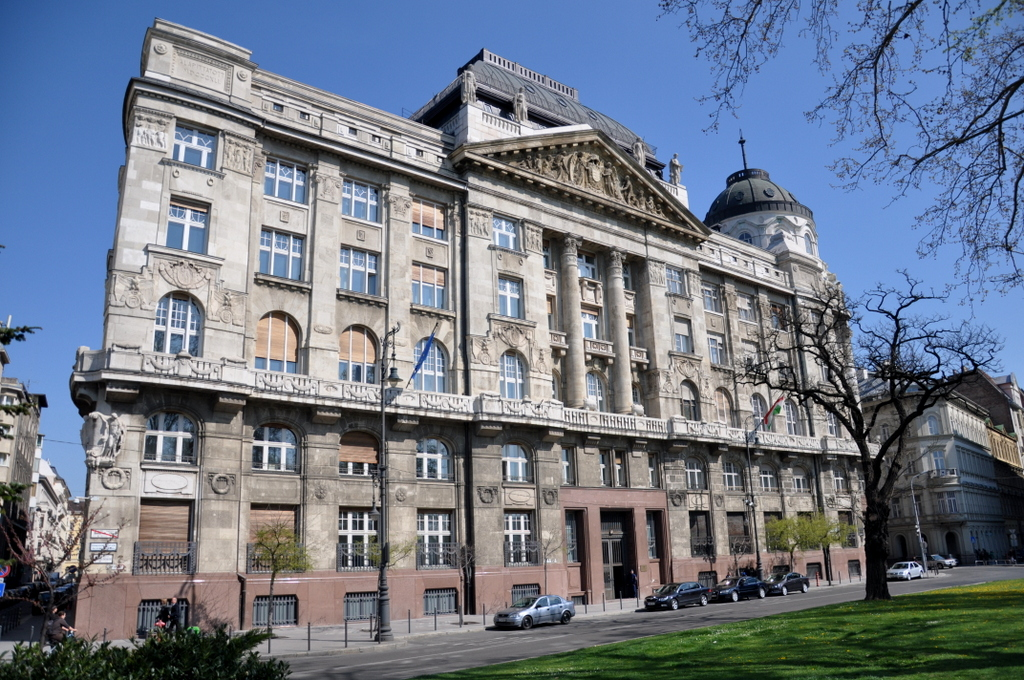
Ministry of Interior

| Minister | In office | Party | Cabinet |
|---|---|---|---|
| Balázs Horváth | 23.05.1990 – 21.12.1990 | MDF | Antall |
| Péter Boross | 21.12.1990 – 21.12.1993 | MDF | Antall |
| Imre Kónya | 21.12.1993 – 15.07.1994 | MDF | Boross |
| Gábor Kuncze | 15.07.1994 – 06.07.1998 | SZDSZ | Horn |
| Sándor Pintér | 06.07.1998 – 27.05.2002 | Independent | Orbán I |
| Mónika Lamperth | 27.05.2002 – 09.06.2006 | MSZP | Medgyessy, Gyurcsány I |
| Sándor Pintér | 29.05.2010 – 09.05.2026 | Independent | Orbán II, Orbán III, Orbán IV, Orbán V |
| Gábor Pósfai | Since 09.05.2026 | TISZA | Magyar |

Ministry of Local Government (2006-2010)

| Minister | In office | Party | Cabinet |
|---|---|---|---|
| Mónika Lamperth | 09.06.2006 – 30.06.2007 | MSZP | Gyurcsány II |
| Gordon Bajnai | 30.06.2007 – 30.04.2008 | Independent | Gyurcsány II |
| István Gyenesei | 30.04.2008 – 14.04.2009 | Somogyért | Gyurcsány II |
| Zoltán Varga | 14.04.2009 – 29.05.2010 | MSZP | Bajnai |

Ministry of Justice and Law Enforcement (2006-2010)

| Minister | In office | Party | Cabinet |
|---|---|---|---|
| József Petrétei | 09.06.2006 – 31.05.2007 | Independent | Gyurcsány II |
| Albert Takács | 01.06.2007 – 17.02.2008 | Independent | Gyurcsány II |
| Tibor Draskovics | 18.02.2008 – 14.12.2009 | Independent | Gyurcsány II, Bajnai |
| Imre Forgács | 14.12.2009 – 29.05.2010 | Independent | Bajnai |

=== Minister of Foreign Affairs and Trade ===
The Minister of Foreign Affairs of Hungary (Hungarian: Magyarország külügyminisztere) is a member of the Hungarian cabinet and the head of the Ministry of Foreign Affairs. The current foreign minister is Anita Orbán.

| Minister | In office | Party | Cabinet |
|---|---|---|---|
| Géza Jeszenszky | 23.05.1990 – 15.07.1994 | MDF | Antall, Boross |
| László Kovács | 15.07.1994 – 08.07.1998 | MSZP | Horn |
| János Martonyi | 08.07.1998 – 27.05.2002 | Independent | Orbán I |
| László Kovács | 27.05.2002 – 01.11.2004 | MSZP | Medgyessy, Gyurcsány I |
| Ferenc Somogyi | 01.11.2004 – 09.06.2006 | Independent | Gyurcsány I |
| Kinga Göncz | 09.06.2006 – 14.04.2009 | Independent | Gyurcsány II |
| Péter Balázs | 14.04.2009 – 29.05.2010 | Independent | Bajnai |
| János Martonyi | 29.05.2010 – 06.06.2014 | Fidesz | Orbán II |
| Tibor Navracsics | 06.06.2014 – 23.09.2014 | Fidesz | Orbán III |
| Péter Szijjártó | 23.09.2014 – 09.05.2026 | Fidesz | Orbán III, Orbán IV, Orbán V |
| Anita Orbán | 09.05.2026 – | TISZA | Magyar |

=== Minister of Finance ===
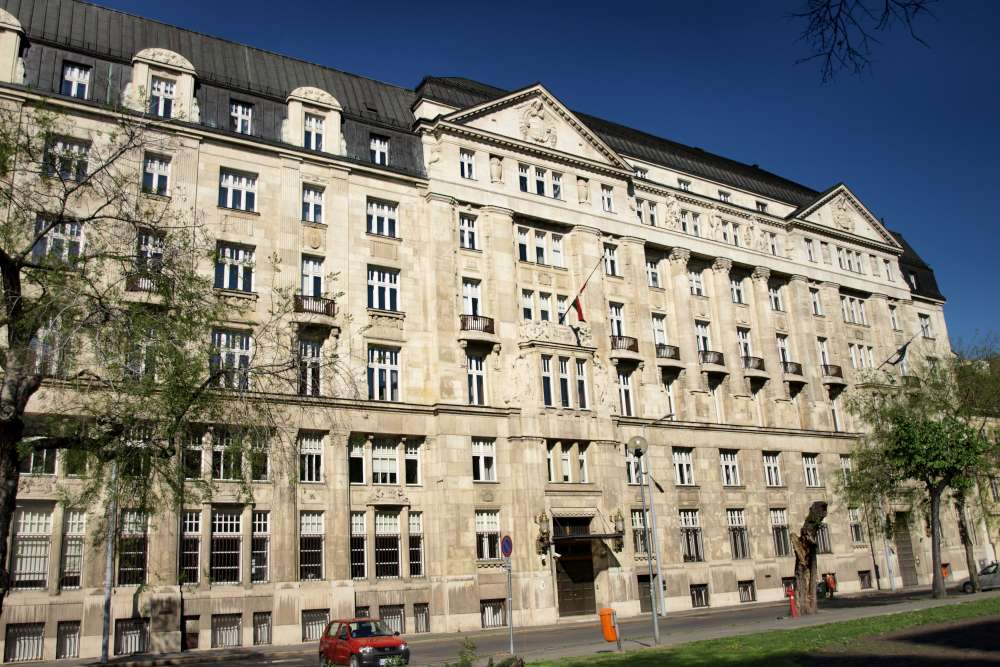
Ministry of National Economy

The Minister of Finance of Hungary (Hungarian: Magyarország pénzügyminisztere) is a member of the Hungarian cabinet and the head of the Ministry of Finance.

| Minister | In office | Party | Cabinet |
Minister of Finance
| Ferenc Rabár | 23.05.1990 – 19.12.1990 | Independent | Antall |
| Mihály Kupa | 20.12.1990 – 11.02.1993 | MDF | Antall |
| Iván Szabó | 24.02.1993 – 15.07.1994 | MDF | Antall, Boross |
| László Békesi | 15.07.1994 – 28.02.1995 | MSZP | Horn |
| Lajos Bokros | 01.03.1995 – 29.02.1996 | MSZP | Horn |
| Péter Medgyessy | 01.03.1996 – 07.07.1998 | Independent | Horn |
| Zsigmond Járai | 08.07.1998 – 31.12.2000 | Fidesz | Orbán I |
| Mihály Varga | 01.01.2001 – 27.05.2002 | Fidesz | Orbán I |
| Csaba László | 27.05.2002 – 15.02.2004 | MSZP | Medgyessy |
| Tibor Draskovics | 15.02.2004 – 24.04.2005 | Independent | Medgyessy, Gyurcsány I |
| János Veres | 24.04.2005 – 16.04.2009 | MSZP | Gyurcsány I, Gyurcsány II |
| Péter Oszkó | 16.04.2009 – 29.05.2010 | Independent | Bajnai |
Minister of National Economy
| György Matolcsy | 29.05.2010 – 07.03.2013 | Fidesz | Orbán II |
| Mihály Varga | 07.03.2013 – 31.12.2024 | Fidesz | Orbán II, Orbán III, Orbán IV, Orbán V |
| Márton Nagy | 01.01.2025 – 09.05.2026 | Fidesz | Orbán V |
| András Kármán | 09.05.2026 – present | TISZA | Magyar |

== See also ==
- Third Republic (since 1989)
- Politics of Hungary
- Foreign relations of Hungary
