= Ministry of Agriculture (Hungary) =

Government minister of Hungary

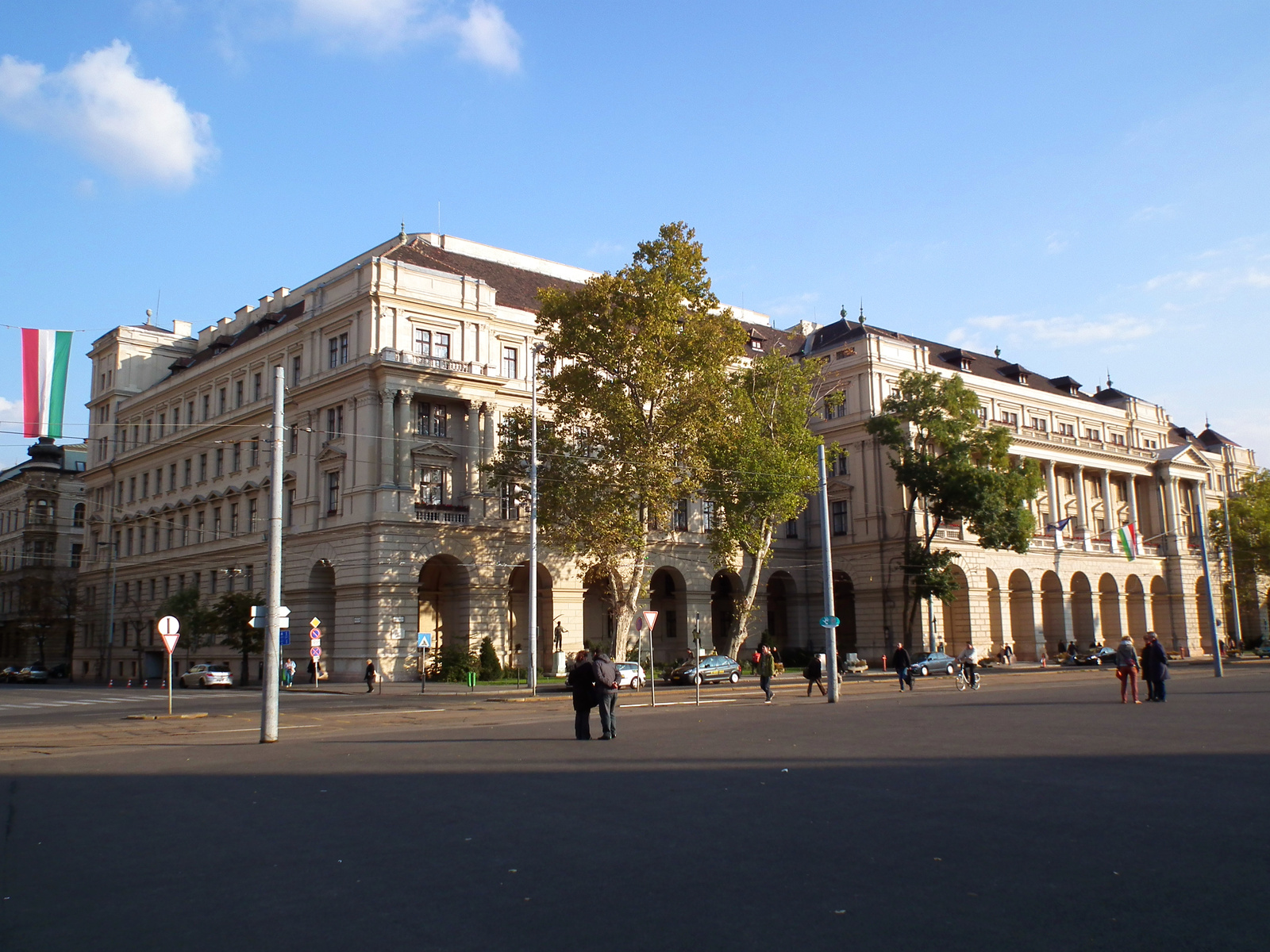
The headquarters in Budapest

The Hungarian Ministry of Agriculture (Agrárminisztérium) is a cabinet-level government department headed by the Minister of Agriculture. It was founded in 1848 as the Ministry of Agriculture, Industry and Trade

== History ==
- 1848, founded as Ministry of Agriculture, Industry and Trade (Földművelésügyi, Ipari és Kereskedelmi Minisztérium)
- 1889, renamed as Ministry of Agriculture (Földművelésügyi Minisztérium)
- 1919, briefly, People's Commissariat of Agriculture during the short-lived Hungarian Soviet Republic
- 1967, renamed as Ministry of Agriculture and Food (Mezőgazdasági és Élelmezésügyi Minisztérium)

The ministry added the duties from the Ministry of Foodstuffs (EM), the National Forestry Directorate-General (OEF) and the State Surveying and Cartography Office (ÁFTH) to the ministry's scope.
In 1988 the National Water Bureau was transferred from Agriculture to the newly created Ministry of Environment and Water.

- 1990, renamed as Ministry of Agriculture (Földművelésügyi Minisztérium)

The scope of duties remained unchanged.

- 1998, renamed as Ministry of Agriculture and Rural Development (Földművelésügyi és Vidékfejlesztési Minisztérium)
- 2010, renamed as Ministry of Rural Development (Vidékfejlesztési Minisztérium)

In 2011 the Ministry of Environment and Water was abolished and the duties returned to Agriculture.

- 2014, renamed as Ministry of Agriculture (Földművelésügyi Minisztérium)
- 2018, renamed as Ministry of Agriculture (Agrárminisztérium)

The scope of duties remained unchanged.
