= Béla Kádár (politician) =

Hungarian politician (1934–2026)

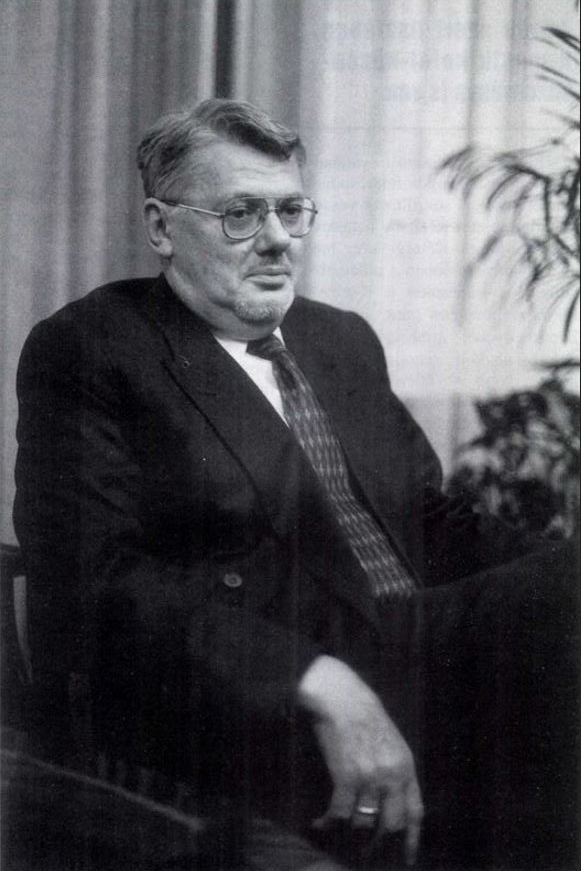
- Kádár in 1993

Member of the National Assembly of Hungary for Baranya County
- In office 28 June 1994 – 17 June 1998

Minister of International Economic Relations
- In office 23 May 1990 – 15 July 1994

Personal details
- Born: 21 March 1934 Pécs, Hungary
- Died: 7 July 2026 (aged 92)
- Party: MDF
- Education: Karl Marx University of Economic Sciences
- Occupation: Economist

Béla Kádár (21 March 1934 – 7 July 2026) was a Hungarian economist and politician. A member of the Hungarian Democratic Forum, he served as Minister of International Economic Relations from 1990 to 1994 and was a member of the National Assembly from 1994 to 1998.

Kádár died on 7 July 2026, at the age of 92.
