= Antall government =

Governing cabinet of Hungary, 1990–1993

Antall Government
- 62nd Cabinet of Hungary

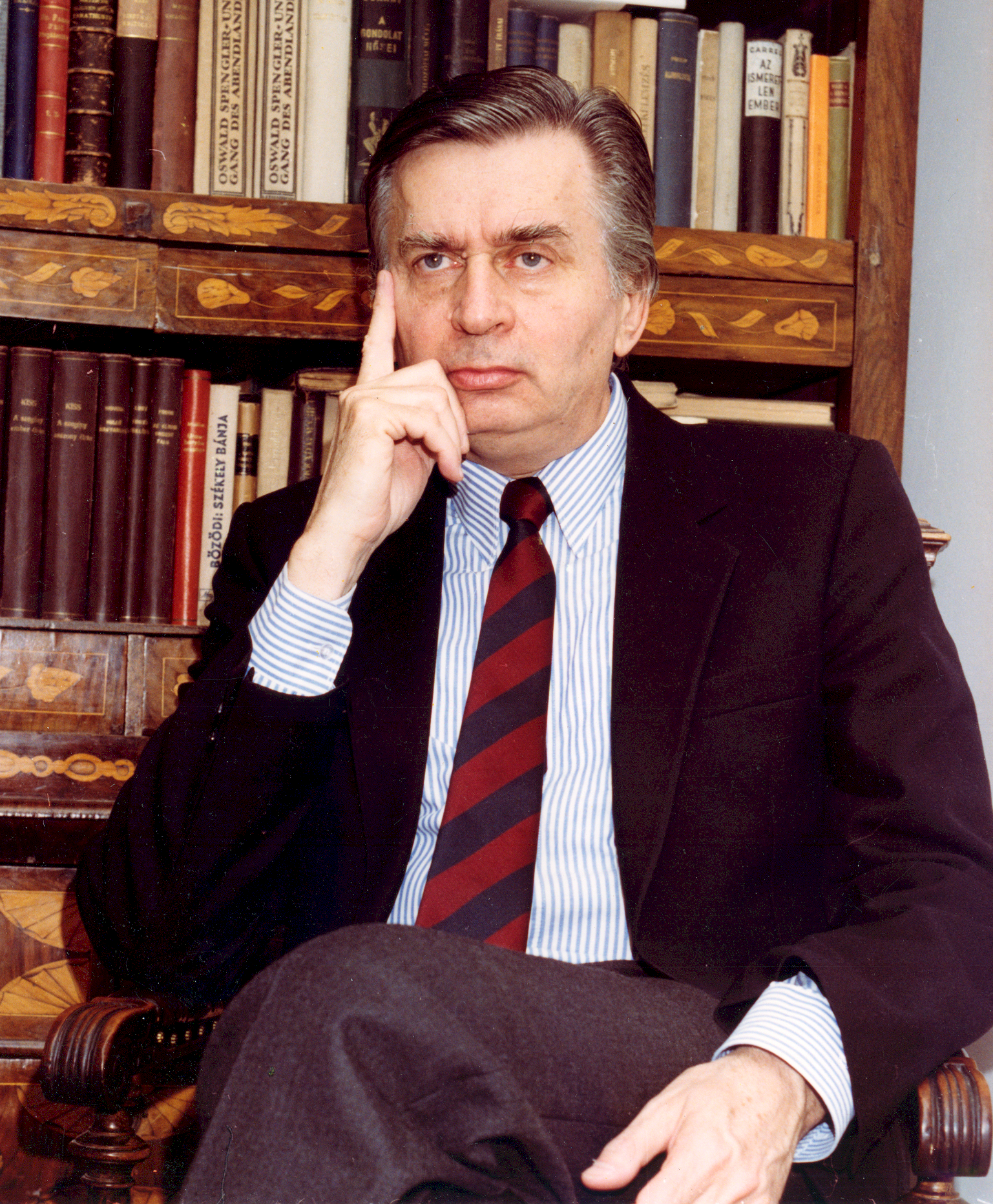
- Date formed: 23 May 1990
- Date dissolved: 21 December 1993

People and organisations
- Head of state: Árpád Göncz (Ind.)
- Head of government: József Antall Péter Boross (acting)
- Member party: MDF; FKgP (to 1992); EKgP (from 1992); KDNP
- Status in legislature: Majority
- Opposition party: SZDSZ; MSZP; Fidesz; FKgP; MIÉP
- Opposition leader: János Kis, Péter Tölgyessy, Iván Pető (SZDSZ); Gyula Horn (MSZP); Viktor Orbán (Fidesz); József Torgyán (FKgP); István Csurka (MIÉP)

History
- Election: 1990 election
- Outgoing election: -
- Legislature term: 1990–1994
- Successor: Boross

The government of József Antall was the first governing cabinet of Hungary after the end of Communism. It was elected in 1990 in the first free and fair democratic elections since 1945. The government was a center-right coalition of the Hungarian Democratic Forum, the Independent Smallholders' Party and the Christian Democratic People's Party. The government began the process of transitioning to a market economy, overseeing the withdrawal of Soviet troops, and consolidating Hungary's new multi-party order.

The government underwent a minor crisis when the FKGP split into two groups on 24 February 1992. A group of 33 then 36 MPs) continued to support the government, while a group of 12 then 10 MPs went into opposition. The former officially established the United Smallholders' Party in November 1993.

Antall died in office on 12 December 1993, and Interior Minister Péter Boross subsequently took over as prime minister.

== Party breakdown ==
=== Beginning of term ===
Party breakdown of cabinet ministers in the beginning of term:

- MDF
11
- FKgP
4
- KDNP
1
- Independents
1

=== End of term ===
Party breakdown of cabinet ministers in the end of term:

- MDF
10
- EKgP
4
- KDNP
2
- Independents
1

== Vote in parliament ==
Election of the Prime Minister; József Antall (MDF)
Ballot →	23 May 1990
Required majority →	194 out of 386
Yes: • MDF (155); • FKGP (40); • KDNP (19); • Independent (4)	218 / 386
No: • SZDSZ (76); • MSZP (28); • Fidesz (17); • Independent (1)	122 / 386
Abstain: • SZDSZ (5); • MSZP (1); • Independent (2)	8 / 386
Not voting: • SZDSZ (13); • MDF (10); • Fidesz (5); • FKGP (4); • MSZP (4); • KDNP (2)	38 / 386

== Composition ==
Office	Image	Incumbent	Political party	In office
Prime Minister		József Antall	MDF	23 May 1990 – 12 December 1993
Prime Minister		Péter Boross acting	MDF	12 December 1993 – 21 December 1993
Minister of Internal Affairs		Balázs Horváth	MDF	23 May 1990 – 21 December 1990
Minister of Internal Affairs		Péter Boross	MDF	21 December 1990 – 21 December 1993
Minister of Foreign Affairs		Géza Jeszenszky	MDF	23 May 1990 – 21 December 1993
Minister of Finance		Ferenc Rabár	Independent	23 May 1990 – 10 December 1990
Minister of Finance		Mihály Kupa	MDF	10 December 1990 – 11 February 1993
Minister of Finance		Iván Szabó	MDF	11 February 1993 – 21 December 1993
Minister of Industry and Trade		Péter Ákos Bod	MDF	23 May 1990 – 9 December 1991
Minister of Industry and Trade		Iván Szabó	MDF	9 December 1991 – 24 February 1993
Minister of Industry and Trade		János Latorcai	KDNP	24 February 1993 – 21 December 1993
Minister of Agriculture		Ferenc József Nagy	FKgP	23 May 1990 – 16 January 1991
Minister of Agriculture		Elemér Gergátz	FKgP	16 January 1991 – 24 February 1993
Minister of Agriculture		János Szabó	EKgP	24 February 1993 – 21 December 1993
Minister of Justice		István Balsai	MDF	23 May 1990 – 21 December 1993
Minister of Welfare		László Surján	KDNP	23 May 1990 – 21 December 1993
Minister of Culture and Public Education		Bertalan Andrásfalvy	MDF	23 May 1990 – 22 February 1993
Minister of Culture and Public Education		Ferenc Mádl	Independent	22 February 1993 – 21 December 1993
Minister of Defense		Lajos Für	MDF	23 May 1990 – 21 December 1993
Minister of Labour		Sandor Győriványi	FKgP	23 May 1990 – 16 January 1991
Minister of Labour		Gyula Kiss	FKgP→EKgP	16 January 1991 – 21 December 1993
Minister for the Environment and Regional Development		Sándor K. Keresztes	MDF	23 May 1990 – 22 February 1993
Minister for the Environment and Regional Development		János Gyurkó	MDF	22 February 1993 – 21 December 1993
Minister of Transport, Communications and Water		Csaba Siklós	MDF	23 May 1990 – 22 February 1993
Minister of Transport, Communications and Water		György Schamschula	MDF	22 February 1993 – 21 December 1993
Minister of International Economic Relations		Béla Kádár	MDF	23 May 1990 – 21 December 1993
