= Association for Somogy =

Hungarian political party

The Association for Somogy (Hungarian: Somogyért, officially: Somogyért Egyesület) is a local political party in the county of Somogy in Hungary, allied with the Hungarian Socialist Party. At the legislative elections, April 9 and 23, 2006, the party won 1 constituency seat.

It was founded on May 25, 1994 by 109 politicians and entrepreneurs in Somogy. It was led by István Gyenesei, engineer and economist, former chairman of the Somogy County General Assembly.

== Website ==
- Somogyért (in Hungarian)
