= Bajnai government =

Cabinet of Hungary under Gordon Bajnai

- 69th Cabinet of Hungary

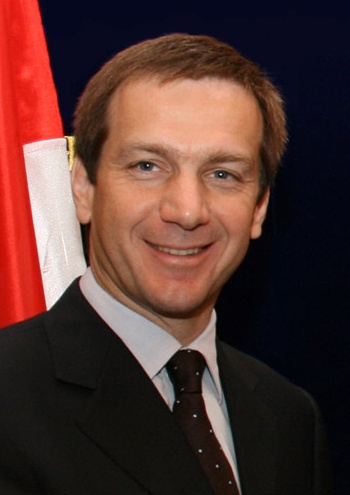
- Date formed: 14 April 2009
- Date dissolved: 29 May 2010

People and organisations
- Head of state: László Sólyom
- Head of government: Gordon Bajnai
- Member party: MSZP
- Status in legislature: Minority
- Opposition party: Fidesz; KDNP; SZDSZ; MDF
- Opposition leader: Viktor Orbán (Fidesz)

History
- Election: -
- Outgoing election: 11 and 25 April 2010
- Legislature term: 2006–2010
- Predecessor: Gyurcsány II
- Successor: Orbán II

The government of Gordon Bajnai was the government of Hungary between 14 April 2009 and 29 May 2010. Gordon Bajnai formed a minority government after the resignation of Ferenc Gyurcsány. The cabinet was supported externally by the parliamentary group of the Alliance of Free Democrats (SZDSZ).

== Vote in Parliament ==
Election of the Prime Minister; Gordon Bajnai (Ind.)
Ballot →	14 April 2009
Required majority →	193 out of 385
Yes: • MSZP (186); • SZDSZ (16); • Independent (2)	204 / 385
No	0 / 385
Abstain: • Independent (8)	8 / 385
Not voting: • Fidesz (139); • KDNP (23); • MSZP (3); • SZDSZ (3); • Independent (5)	173 / 385

== Members ==
Coalition members: MSZP and Independent ministers

Office	Image	Incumbent	Political party	In office
Prime Minister		Gordon Bajnai	Independent	14 April 2009 – 29 May 2010
Minister of the Prime Minister's Office		Csaba Molnár	MSZP	14 April 2009 – 29 May 2010
Minister of Local Government		Zoltán Varga	MSZP	14 April 2009 – 29 May 2010
Minister of Foreign Affairs		Péter Sándor	Independent	14 April 2009 – 29 May 2010
Minister of Finance		Péter Oszkó	Independent	14 April 2009 – 29 May 2010
Minister of National Development and Economy		Péter Hónig (acting)	Independent	14 April 2009 – 29 April 2009
Minister of National Development and Economy		István Varga	Independent	29 April 2009 – 29 May 2010
Minister of Agriculture and Rural Development		József Gráf	MSZP	14 April 2009 – 29 May 2010
Minister of Justice and Law Enforcement		Tibor Draskovics	Independent	14 April 2009 – 14 December 2009
Minister of Justice and Law Enforcement		Imre Forgács	Independent	15 December 2009 – 29 May 2010
Minister of Health		Tamás Székely	Independent	14 April 2009 – 29 May 2010
Minister of Social Affairs and Labour		László Herczog	Independent	14 April 2009 – 29 May 2010
Minister of Transport, Communications and Energy		Péter Hónig	Independent	14 April 2009 – 29 May 2010
Minister of Education and Culture		István Hiller	MSZP	14 April 2009 – 29 May 2010
Minister of Defence		Imre Szekeres	MSZP	14 April 2009 – 29 May 2010
Minister of Environment and Water		Imre Szabó	MSZP	14 April 2009 – 29 May 2010
Minister without portfolio for coordination of social policy		Péter Kiss	MSZP	14 April 2009 – 29 May 2010
Minister without portfolio for civilian intelligence services		Ádám Ficsor	MSZP	14 April 2009 – 13 September 2009
Minister without portfolio for civilian intelligence services		Csaba Molnár (acting)	MSZP	13 September 2009 – 17 September 2009
Minister without portfolio for civilian intelligence services		Gábor Juhász	MSZP	17 September 2009 – 29 May 2010
