= Second Gyurcsány government =

Second cabinet of Hungary under Ferenc Gyurcsány

- 68th Cabinet of Hungary

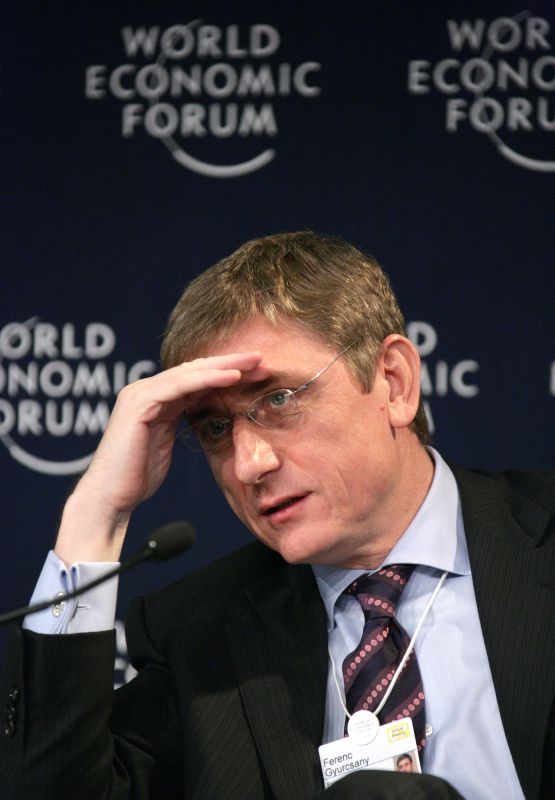
- Gyurcsány in 2007
- Date formed: 9 June 2006
- Date dissolved: 14 April 2009

People and organisations
- Head of state: László Sólyom
- Head of government: Ferenc Gyurcsány
- Member party: MSZP; SZDSZ (until 30 April 2008); Somogyért (from 30 April 2008)
- Status in legislature: Majority (until 30 April 2008); Minority (from 30 April 2008)
- Opposition party: Fidesz; KDNP; SZDSZ (from 30 April 2008); MDF
- Opposition leader: Viktor Orbán (Fidesz)

History
- Election: 9 and 23 April 2006
- Legislature term: 2006–2010
- Predecessor: Gyurcsány I
- Successor: Bajnai

The second Gyurcsány government took its oath of office on June 9, 2006, following the first Gyurcsány government in power. It was the seventh government after the regime change. The majority of the government consisted of the Hungarian Socialist Party (MSZP), which won the 2006 elections, and the Alliance of Free Democrats (SZDSZ) until 30 April 2008, when the SZDSZ recalled its ministers and left the coalition. The head of government was Ferenc Gyurcsány (MSZP). On April 14, 2009, the Parliament passed a vote of no confidence against Prime Minister Ferenc Gyurcsány. Since 2006, the Cabinet had suffered from the aftermath of the burnt-out Őszöd speech and the subsequent demonstration series. Nor was it good for the government to try to take control of the crackdown on the protesters by deploying police officers without an identification number, which the national side has since called only the 2006 police terror. The declining GDP debt-to-GDP ratio and the borrowed IMF loan also weighed heavily on the downturn.

== Party breakdown ==
=== Beginning of term ===
Party breakdown of cabinet ministers in the beginning of term:

- Independents
8
- MSZP
7
- SZDSZ
2

=== End of term ===
Party breakdown of cabinet ministers in the end of term:

- MSZP
9
- Independents
7
- Somogyért
1

== Vote in Parliament ==
Election of the Prime Minister; Ferenc Gyurcsány (MSZP)
| Ballot → | 9 June 2006 |
| Required majority → | 194 out of 386 |
| Yes: • MSZP (185); • SZDSZ (20); • Independent (1) | 206 / 386 |
| No: • Fidesz (130); • KDNP (18); • MDF (11) | 159 / 386 |
| Abstain | 0 / 386 |
| Not voting: • Fidesz (11); • KDNP (5); • MSZP (5) | 21 / 386 |

== Composition ==
| Office | Image | Incumbent | Political party | In office |
|---|---|---|---|---|
| Prime Minister | | Ferenc Gyurcsány | MSZP | 9 June 2006 – 20 April 2009 |
| Minister of the Prime Minister's Office | | György Szilvásy | Independent | 9 June 2006 – 30 June 2007 |
| Minister of the Prime Minister's Office | | Péter Kiss | MSZP | 30 June 2007 - 20 April 2009 |
| Minister of Local Government (until 30 April 2008 as Minister of Local Government and Local Development) | | Mónika Lamperth | MSZP | 9 June 2006 - 30 June 2007 |
| Minister of Local Government (until 30 April 2008 as Minister of Local Government and Local Development) | | Gordon Bajnai | MSZP | 30 June 2007 - 14 May 2008 |
| Minister of Local Government (until 30 April 2008 as Minister of Local Government and Local Development) | | István Gyenesei | Somogyért | 14 May 2008 - 20 April 2009 |
| Minister of Foreign Affairs | | Kinga Göncz | Independent | 9 June 2006 – 20 April 2009 |
| Minister of Finance | | János Veres | Independent | 9 June 2006 – 20 April 2009 |
| Minister of National Development and Economy | | Gordon Bajnai | MSZP | 9 June 2006 – 20 April 2009 |
| Minister of Agriculture and Rural Development | | József Gráf | MSZP | 9 June 2006 – 20 April 2009 |
| Minister of Justice and Law Enforcement | | József Petrétei | Independent | 9 June 2006 - 31 May 2007 |
| Minister of Justice and Law Enforcement | | Albert Takács | Independent | 31 May 2007 - 17 February 2008 |
| Minister of Justice and Law Enforcement | | Tibor Draskovics | Independent | 17 February 2008 - 20 April 2009 |
| Minister of Health | | Lajos Molnár | SZDSZ | 9 June 2006 - 6 April 2007 |
| Minister of Health | | János Kóka | SZDSZ | 7 April 2007 - 22 April 2007 |
| Minister of Health | | Ágnes Horváth | SZDSZ | 22 April 2007 - 30 April 2008 |
| Minister of Health | | Tamás Székely | Independent | 30 April 2008 - 20 April 2009 |
| Minister of Social Affairs and Labour | | Péter Kiss | MSZP | 9 June 2006 - 30 June 2007 |
| Minister of Social Affairs and Labour | | Mónika Lamperth | MSZP | 30 June 2007 - 30 April 2008 |
| Minister of Social Affairs and Labour | | Erika Szűcs | MSZP | 30 April 2008 - 20 April 2009 |
| Minister of Education and Culture | | István Hiller | MSZP | 9 June 2006 – 20 April 2009 |
| Minister of Defence | | Imre Szekeres | MSZP | 9 June 2006 – 20 April 2009 |
| Minister of Environment and Water | | Miklós Persányi | Independent | 9 June 2006 - 6 May 2007 |
| Minister of Environment and Water | | Gábor Fodor | SZDSZ | 6 May 2007 - 30 April 2008 |
| Minister of Environment and Water | | Imre Szabó | MSZP | 30 April 2008 - 20 April 2009 |
| Minister without portfolio for coordination of social policy | | Tibor Draskovics | Independent | 9 June 2006 – 20 April 2009 |
| Minister without portfolio for civilian intelligence services | | György Szilvásy | Independent | 9 June 2006 – 20 April 2009 |
| Minister without portfolio for Research Development | | Károly Molnár | Independent | 9 June 2006 – 20 April 2009 |
| Minister of Transport, Communications and Energy (as minister for economy and transport until 30 April 2008) | | János Kóka | SZDSZ | 9 June 2006 - 7 December 2007 |
| Minister of Transport, Communications and Energy (as minister for economy and transport until 30 April 2008) | | Csaba Kákosy | Independent | 7 December 2007 - 30 April 2008 |
| Minister of Transport, Communications and Energy (as minister for economy and transport until 30 April 2008) | | Pál Szabó | Independent | 30 April 2008 - 30 November 2008 |
| Minister of Transport, Communications and Energy (as minister for economy and transport until 30 April 2008) | | Csaba Molnár | MSZP | 30 November 2008 - 20 April 2009 |
