= Medgyessy government =

Government of Hungary from 2002 to 2004

- 66th Cabinet of Hungary

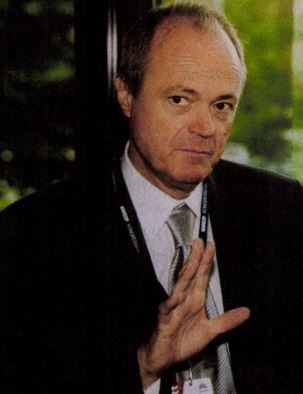
- Date formed: 27 May 2002
- Date dissolved: 4 October 2004

People and organisations
- Head of state: Ferenc Mádl
- Head of government: Péter Medgyessy
- Member party: MSZP; SZDSZ
- Status in legislature: Majority
- Opposition party: Fidesz; MDF
- Opposition leader: Zoltán Pokorni (Fidesz) (2002); János Áder (Fidesz) (2002–2003); Viktor Orbán (Fidesz) (2003–2006)

History
- Election: 7 and 21 April 2002
- Outgoing election: -
- Legislature term: 2002–2006
- Predecessor: Orbán I
- Successor: Gyurcsány I

The Medgyessy government was the fifth government of Hungary after the regime change.

== History ==
The government was formed by the same two parties as the Horn Government between 1994 and 1998: the MSZP and the SZDSZ. Interestingly, Prime Minister Péter Medgyessy was not a member of any governing party (nor any other party). The government took the oath of office on 27 May 2002.

The coalition was in crisis twice: first in 2002, when it was revealed that Medgyessy was a secret agent before the system change (D-209). At that time, the SZDSZ still assured Medgyessy of his trust and helped him stay in his position. The second crisis occurred in August 2004, when Medgyessy wanted to replace István Csillag, Minister of Economy, during a government change. In response, the SZDSZ (whose candidate was Csillag) withdrew confidence from the head of government, who “fled” to resign from the impending motion of censure. The Prime Minister first wanted to resign on 25 August, but withdrew a little later, but submitted it; following his resignation, he served as Executive Prime Minister until 29 September 2004. The prime minister's successor was Ferenc Gyurcsány and his first government.

== Vote in Parliament ==
Election of the Prime Minister; Péter Medgyessy (Ind.)
Ballot →	27 May 2002
Required majority →	194 out of 386
Yes: • MSZP (177); • SZDSZ (20)	197 / 386
No: • Fidesz (156); • MDF (22)	178 / 386
Abstain: • MDF (1)	1 / 386
Not voting: • Fidesz (8); • MDF (1); • MSZP (1)	10 / 386

== Party breakdown ==
Office	Image	Incumbent	Political party	In office
Prime Minister		Péter Medgyessy	Independent	27 May 2002 - 29 September 2004
Prime Minister		Ferenc Gyurcsány	MSZP	29 September 2004 - 3 October 2004
Minister of the Prime Minister's Office		Elemér Kiss	Independent	27 May 2002 - 21 February 2003
Minister of the Prime Minister's Office		Péter Kiss	MSZP	21 February 2003 - 3 October 2004
Minister of Internal Affairs		Mónika Lamperth	MSZP	27 May 2002 - 3 October 2004
Minister of Foreign Affairs		László Kovács	MSZP	27 May 2002 - 3 October 2004
Minister of Finance		Csaba László	Independent	May 27, 2002 - 15 February 2004
Minister of Finance		Tibor Draskovics	Independent	16 February 2004 - 4 October 2004
Minister of Economy and Transport		István Csillag	Independent	27 May 2002 - 3 October 2004
Minister of Agriculture and Rural Development		Imre Németh	Independent (supported by ASZ)	27 May 2002 - 3 October 2004
Minister of Justice		Péter Bárándy	Independent	27 May 2002 - 3 October 2004
Minister of Health, Social and Family Affairs		Judit Csehák	MSZP	27 May 2002 - 14 September 2003
Minister of Health, Social and Family Affairs		Mihály Kökény	MSZP	14 September 2003 - 3 October 2004
Minister of National Cultural Heritage		Gábor Görgey	Independent	27 May 2002 - 18 May 2003
Minister of National Cultural Heritage		István Hiller	MSZP	18 May 2003 - 3 October 2004
Minister of Education		Bálint Magyar	SZDSZ	27 May 2002 - 3 October 2004
Minister of Social Affairs and Labour		Péter Kiss	MSZP	27 May 2002 - 2 March 2003
Minister of Social Affairs and Labour		Sándor Burány	MSZP	2 March 2003 - 3 October 2004
Minister of Defence		Ferenc Juhász	MSZP	27 May 2002 - 3 October 2004
Minister of Environment and Water		Mária Kóródi	SZDSZ	27 May 2002 - 18 May 2003
Minister of Environment and Water		Miklós Persányi	Independent	18 May 2003 - 3 October 2004
Minister of Youth and Sport		György Jánosi	MSZP	27 May 2002 - 18 May 2003
Minister of Youth and Sport		Ferenc Gyurcsány	MSZP	18 May 2003 - 3 October 2004
Minister for Communication		Kálmán Kovács	SZDSZ	4 October 2004 - 9 June 2006
Minister without portfolio for European Integration		Etele Baráth	Independent	27 May 2002 - 3 October 2004
Minister without portfolio for Equal Opportunities		Katalin Lévai	MSZP	27 May 2002 - 3 October 2004
