= Boross government =

63rd Cabinet of Hungary (1993–1994)

Boross Government
- 63rd Cabinet of Hungary

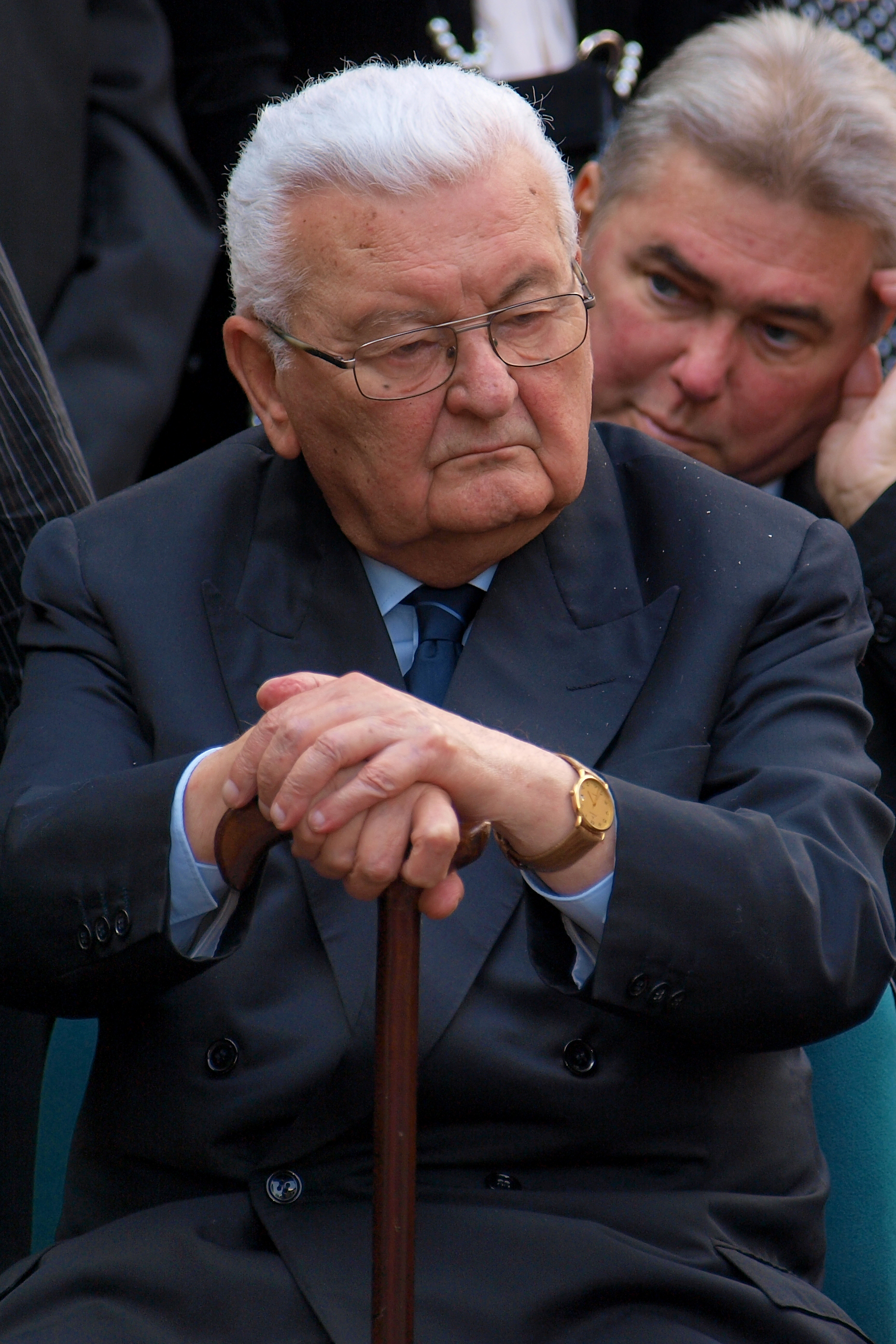
- Date formed: 21 December 1993
- Date dissolved: 15 July 1994

People and organisations
- Head of state: Árpád Göncz
- Head of government: Péter Boross
- Member party: MDF; EKgP; KDNP
- Status in legislature: Majority
- Opposition party: SZDSZ; MSZP; Fidesz; FKgP
- Opposition leader: Iván Pető (SZDSZ)

History
- Election: -
- Outgoing election: 1994 election
- Legislature terms: 1990–1994
- Predecessor: Antall
- Successor: Horn

The Boross government was the second cabinet of Hungary after the fall of Communism. It was established on 21 December 1993 under the leadership of Péter Boross, as a coalition of the Hungarian Democratic Forum, United Smallholders' Party and Christian Democratic People's Party. It was formed after the death in office of Prime Minister József Antall on 12 December 1993, upon which the then interior minister Boross became acting prime minister immediately. He was later confirmed in office with a vote of 201 members of parliament over a week later. The cabinet was essentially unchanged from Antall's, with the exception of Imre Kónya taking over Boross's former post of Interior Minister. The government was defeated in the 1994 Hungarian parliamentary election, and subsequently Boross resigned on 15 July 1994 in favor of Gyula Horn.

== Party breakdown ==
Party breakdown of cabinet ministers:

- MDF
10
- EKgP
3
- KDNP
3
- Independents
2

== Vote in Parliament ==
Election of the Prime Minister; Péter Boross (MDF)
Ballot →	21 December 1993
Required majority →	192 out of 382
Yes: • MDF (134); • EKgP (32); • KDNP (23); • MIÉP (2); • Independent (10)	201 / 382
No: • SZDSZ (77); • MSZP (31); • Fidesz (22); • MIÉP (8); • Independent (14)	152 / 382
Abstain: • EKgP (2); • MIÉP (2); • Independent (2)	5 / 382
Not voting: • SZDSZ (7); • MDF (2); • EKgP (2); • MSZP (2); • Fidesz (1); • KDNP (1); • Independent (8)	24 / 382

== Composition ==
Office	Image	Incumbent	Political party	In office
Prime Minister		Péter Boross	MDF	21 December 1993 – 15 July 1994
Minister of Internal Affairs		Imre Kónya	MDF	21 December 1993 – 15 July 1994
Minister of Foreign Affairs		Géza Jeszenszky	MDF	21 December 1993 – 15 July 1994
Minister of Finance		Iván Szabó	MDF	21 December 1993 – 15 July 1994
Minister of Industry and Trade		János Latorcai	KDNP	21 December 1993 – 15 July 1994
Minister of Agriculture		János Szabó	EKgP	21 December 1993 – 15 July 1994
Minister of Justice		István Balsai	MDF	21 December 1993 – 15 July 1994
Minister of Welfare		László Surján	KDNP	21 December 1993 – 15 July 1994
Minister of Culture and Public Education		Ferenc Mádl	Independent	21 December 1993 – 15 July 1994
Minister of Defense		Lajos Für	MDF	21 December 1993 – 15 July 1994
Minister of Labour		Gyula Kiss	EKgP	21 December 1993 – 15 July 1994
Minister for the Environment and Water		János Gyurkó	MDF	21 December 1993 – 15 July 1994
Minister of Transport, Communications and Water		György Schamschula	MDF	21 December 1993 – 15 July 1994
Minister of International Economic Relations		Béla Kádár	MDF	21 December 1993 – 15 July 1994
Minister without portfolio for secret services		Tibor Füzessy	KDNP	21 December 1993 – 15 July 1994
Minister without portfolio for compensation		Ferenc József Nagy	EKgP	21 December 1993 – 15 July 1994
Minister without portfolio leading the National Technical Development Committee		Ernő Pungor	Independent	21 December 1993 – 15 July 1994
Minister without portfolio for privatization		Tamás Szabó	MDF	21 December 1993 – 15 July 1994
