= First Gyurcsány government =

2004–06 government of Hungary

- 67th Cabinet of Hungary

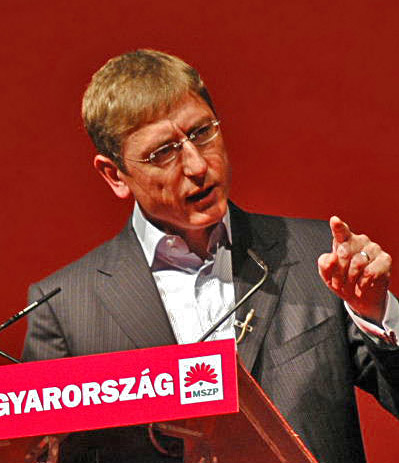
- Date formed: 4 October 2004
- Date dissolved: 9 June 2006

People and organisations
- Head of state: Ferenc Mádl; László Sólyom
- Head of government: Ferenc Gyurcsány
- Member party: MSZP; SZDSZ
- Status in legislature: Majority
- Opposition party: Fidesz; KDNP; MDF
- Opposition leader: Viktor Orbán (Fidesz)

History
- Election: -
- Outgoing election: 9 and 23 April 2006
- Legislature term: 2002–2006
- Predecessor: Medgyessy
- Successor: Gyurcsány II

The first Gyurcsány government was the sixth government of Hungary after the regime change from October 4, 2004 to June 9, 2006.

== History ==
The government came to power after the resignation of Prime Minister Péter Medgyessy. The coalition formed by the MSZP and the SZDSZ has survived. The oath of office was taken by the government on 4 October 2004. The government led by Ferenc Gyurcsány was in office as the executive government after the 2006 election victory until June 9, and then continued its work under the name of the Second Gyurcsány Government.

== Party breakdown ==
- MSZP
10
- Independents
6
- SZDSZ
2

== Vote in Parliament ==
Election of the Prime Minister; Ferenc Gyurcsány (MSZP)
Ballot →	29 September 2004
Required majority →	193 out of 384
Yes: • MSZP (177); • SZDSZ (20)	197 / 384
No: • MDF (9); • Independent (3)	12 / 384
Abstain	0 / 384
Not voting: • Fidesz (160); • MDF (8); • MSZP (1); • Independent (6)	175 / 384

== Composition ==
Office	Image	Incumbent	Political party	In office
Prime Minister		Ferenc Gyurcsány	MSZP	4 October 2004 - 9 June 2006
Minister of the Prime Minister's Office		Péter Kiss	MSZP	4 October 2004 - 9 June 2006
Minister of Internal Affairs		Mónika Lamperth	MSZP	4 October 2004 - 9 June 2006
Minister of Foreign Affairs		László Kovács	MSZP	4 October 2004 – 31 October 2004
Minister of Foreign Affairs		Ferenc Somogyi	Independent	31 October 2004 - 9 June 2006
Minister of Finance		Tibor Draskovics	Independent	4 October 2004 - 25 April 2005
Minister of Finance		János Veres	MSZP	25 April 2005 - 9 June 2006
Minister of Economy and Transport		János Kóka	SZDSZ	4 October 2004 - 9 June 2006
Minister of Agriculture and Rural Development		Imre Németh	Independent	4 October 2004 - 2 May 2005
Minister of Agriculture and Rural Development		József Gráf	MSZP	2 May 2005 - 9 June 2006
Minister of Justice		József Petréti	Independent	4 October 2004 - 9 June 2006
Minister of Health, Social and Family Affairs		Jenő Rácz	Independent	4 October 2004 - 9 June 2006
Minister of National Cultural Heritage		István Hiller	MSZP	4 October 2004 - 13 February 2005
Minister of National Cultural Heritage		András Bozóki	Independent	13 February 2005 - 9 June 2006
Minister of Education		Bálint Magyar	SZDSZ	4 October 2004 - 9 June 2006
Minister of Social Affairs and Labour		Gábor Csizmár	MSZP	4 October 2004 - 9 June 2006
Minister of Defence		Ferenc Juhász	MSZP	4 October 2004 - 9 June 2006
Minister of Environment and Water		Miklós Persányi	Independent	4 October 2004 - 9 June 2006
Minister of Youth, Family Affairs, and Creation of Equal Opportunities		Kinga Göncz	MSZP	4 October 2004 - 9 June 2006
Minister for Communication		Kálmán Kovács	SZDSZ	4 October 2004 - 9 June 2006
Minister without portfolio for European Integration		Etele Baráth	Independent	4 October 2004 - 9 June 2006
Minister without portfolio for Regional Development		István Kolber	MSZP	4 October 2004 - 9 June 2006
