= First Orbán government =

Hungarian government from 1998 to 2002

- 65th Cabinet of Hungary

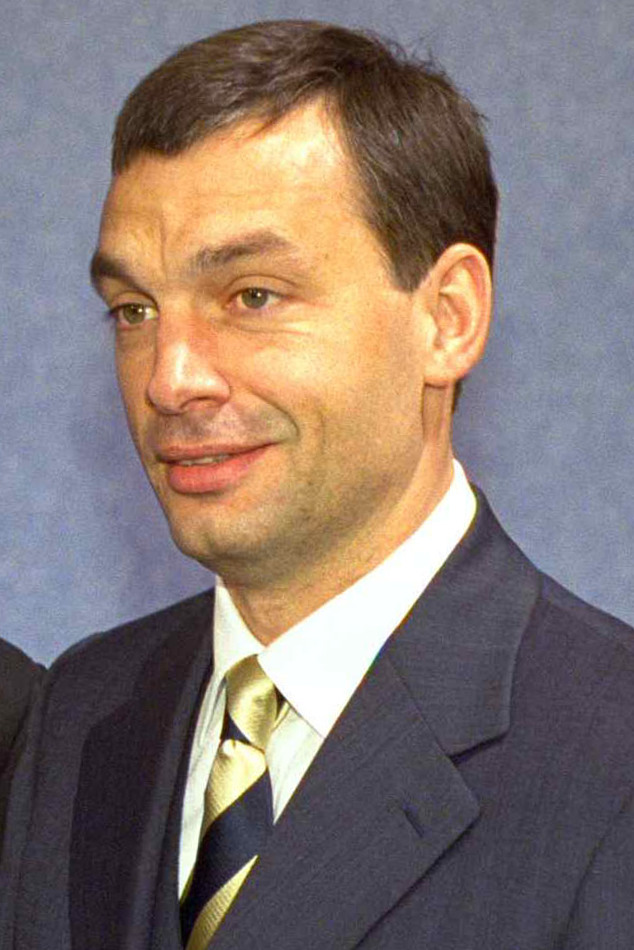
- Date formed: 8 July 1998
- Date dissolved: 27 May 2002

People and organisations
- Head of state: Árpád Göncz; Ferenc Mádl
- Head of government: Viktor Orbán
- Member party: Fidesz; FKgP; MDF
- Status in legislature: Majority
- Opposition party: MSZP; SZDSZ; MIÉP
- Opposition leader: Gyula Horn (MSZP) (1998); László Kovács (MSZP) (1998–2002)

History
- Election: 1998 election
- Outgoing election: 2002 election
- Legislature term: 1998–2002
- Predecessor: Horn
- Successor: Medgyessy

The first Orbán government was the fourth democratically-elected government in Hungary after the end of communist rule. It existed between 1998 and 2002. Its creation was made possible by the FKgP: the party withdrew 82 candidates in the second round of the election, so FKgP voters voted for the local Fidesz candidate instead, thus reversing the election result. Due to the resignations in the Parliament afterwards, the votes of the way smaller but still large number of 48 smallholder representatives were essential for the formation of the government. The governmental relationship between the two parties was formed by the coalition agreement developed by the negotiating delegations, led by László Kövér and Béla Szabadi.

The coalition government consisted of three parties: Fidesz, FKgP and MDF. Prime Minister Viktor Orbán took his oath of office on July 6, 1998, and his ministers took office on July 8, two days later. The coalition was dissolved in 2001, if not formally, but on its merits: the coalition agreement virtually expired. The FKgP could not even recall Imre Boros, even though the right to nominate belonged to the party. From the moment that József Torgyán, the chairman of the FKgP, was forced to resign as a minister because of his son's so called "cassette case", although he was able to retain his position within the party, but his position weakened considerably: his party faction expelled the party chairman from the group with votes from Fidesz supporters and in violation of house rules. He assured the government of the support of five members who had previously been expelled or separated from the smallholder faction, leaving a majority in the National Assembly for a time. At the same time, the government received external support from MIÉP.

== Party breakdown ==
=== Beginning of term ===
Party breakdown of cabinet ministers in the beginning of term:

- Fidesz
6
- FKgP
4
- MDF
1
- Independents
7

=== End of term ===
Party breakdown of cabinet ministers in the end of term:

- Fidesz
7
- FKgP
4
- MDF
1
- Independents
6

== Vote in Parliament ==
Election of the Prime Minister; Viktor Orbán (Fidesz)
Ballot →	6 July 1998
Required majority →	194 out of 386
Yes: • Fidesz (146); • FKGP (47); • MDF (16); • MIÉP (12); • Independent (1)	222 / 386
No: • MSZP (102); • SZDSZ (17)	119 / 386
Abstain: • MSZP (6); • SZDSZ (2)	8 / 386
Not voting: • MSZP (26); • SZDSZ (5); • Fidesz (2); • MIÉP (2); • MDF (1); • FKGP (1)	37 / 386

== Composition ==
Office	Image	Incumbent	Political party	In office
Prime Minister		Viktor Orbán	Fidesz	6 July 1998 - 27 May 2002
Minister of the Prime Minister's Office		István Stumpf	Independent	8 July 1998 - 27 May 2002
Minister of Internal Affairs		Sándor Pintér	Independent	8 July 1998 - 27 May 2002
Minister of Foreign Affairs		János Martonyi	Independent	8 July 1998 - 27 May 2002
Minister of Finance		Zsigmond Járai	Independent	8 July 1998 - 31 December 2000
Minister of Finance		Mihály Varga	Fidesz	31 December 2000 - 27 May 2002
Minister of Economy		Attila Chikán	Independent	8 July 1998 - 31 December 1999
Minister of Economy		György Matolcsy	Independent	31 December 1999 - 27 May 2002
Minister of Agriculture and Rural Development		József Torgyán	FKgP	8 July 1998 - 15 February 2001
Minister of Agriculture and Rural Development		Imre Boros	FKgP	15 February 2001 - 25 March 2001
Minister of Agriculture and Rural Development		András Vonza	FKgP	25 March 2001 - 27 May 2002
Minister of Justice		Ibolya Dávid	MDF	8 July 1998 - 27 May 2002
Minister of Health		Árpád Gógl	Fidesz	8 July 1998 - 31 December 2000
Minister of Health		István Mikola	Independent	31 December 2000 - 27 May 2002
Minister of National Cultural Heritage		József Hámori	Independent	8 July 1998 - 31 December 1999
Minister of National Cultural Heritage		Zoltán Rockenbauer	Fidesz	31 December 1999 - 27 May 2002
Minister of Education		Zoltán Pokorni	Fidesz	8 July 1998 - 15 July 2001
Minister of Education		József Pálinkás	Fidesz	15 July 2001 - 27 May 2002
Minister of Social Affairs		Péter Harrach	Fidesz	8 July 1998 - 27 May 2002
Minister of Defence		János Szabó	FKgP	8 July 1998 - 27 May 2002
Minister of Environment		Pál Pepó	FKgP	8 July 1998 - 19 June 2000
Minister of Environment		Ferenc Ligetvári	FKgP	19 June 2000 - 30 November 2000
Minister of Environment		Béla Turi-Kovács	FKgP	30 November 2000 - 27 May 2002
Minister of Transportation, Communication and Water		Kálmán Katona	Independent	8 July 1998 - 31 May 2000
Minister of Transportation, Communication and Water		László Nógrádi	Fidesz	31 May 2000 - 30 November 2000
Minister of Transportation, Communication and Water		János Fónagy	Fidesz	30 November 2000 - 27 May 2002
Minister for Youth and Sport		Tamás Deutsch	Fidesz	1 January 1999 - 27 May 2002
Minister without portfolio for Secret Services		László Kövér	Fidesz	8 July 1998 - 2 May 2000
Minister without portfolio for Secret Services		Ervin Demeter	Independent	2 May 2000 - 27 May 2002
Minister without portfolio for the coordination of the PHARE programme		Imre Boros	FKgP	4 October 2004 - 9 June 2006
