= Horn government =

1994–98 Hungarian government

- 64th Cabinet of Hungary

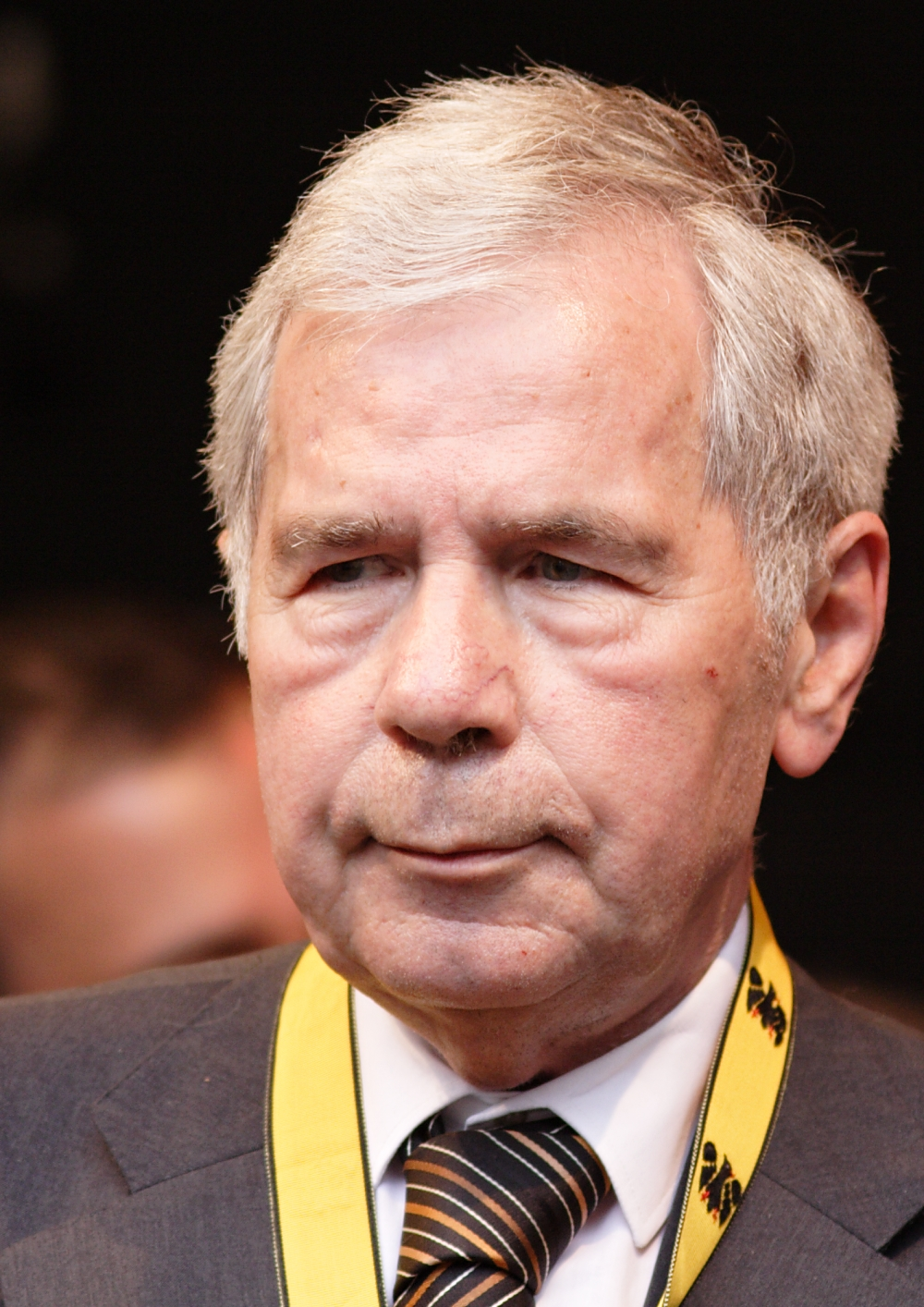
- Date formed: 15 July 1994
- Date dissolved: 8 July 1998

People and organisations
- Head of state: Árpád Göncz
- Head of government: Gyula Horn
- Member party: MSZP; SZDSZ
- Status in legislature: Supermajority
- Opposition party: MDF; FKgP; KDNP; Fidesz
- Opposition leader: Lajos Für (MDF) (1994–1996); Sándor Lezsák (MDF) (1996); József Torgyán (FKgP) (1996–1997); Viktor Orbán (Fidesz) (1997–1998)

History
- Election: 1994 election
- Outgoing election: 1998 election
- Legislature term: 1994–1998
- Predecessor: Boross
- Successor: Orbán I

The Horn government was the third government in Hungary after the change of regime, which was formed from a coalition of two parties, the MSZP and the SZDSZ. The coalition had a two-thirds majority in Parliament, but voluntarily agreed to amend the two-thirds laws only if there was a consensus with the opposition. The government took the oath of office on July 15, 1994. After their defeat of the 1998 elections, Prime Minister Gyula Horn's term expired on 6 July 1998, and the other cabinet members' 8 July 1998.

== Party breakdown ==
=== Beginning of term ===
Party breakdown of cabinet ministers in the beginning of term:

- MSZP
- SZDSZ
11
3

=== End of term ===
Party breakdown of cabinet ministers in the end of term:

- MSZP
10
- SZDSZ
3
- Independents
2

== Vote in Parliament ==
Election of the Prime Minister; Gyula Horn (MSZP)
Ballot →	15 July 1994
Required majority →	186 out of 370
Yes: • MSZP (198); • SZDSZ (65); • KDNP (1); • Independent (1)	265 / 370
No: • MDF (34); • FKGP (25); • KDNP (18); • Fidesz (16)	93 / 370
Abstain: • Fidesz (1)	1 / 370
Not voting: • MDF (4); • SZDSZ (2); • MSZP (2); • Fidesz (2); • FKGP (1)	10 / 370

== Composition ==
Office	Image	Incumbent	Political party	In office
Prime Minister		Gyula Horn	MSZP	15 July 1994 - 6 July 1998
Minister of Internal Affairs		Gábor Kuncze	SZDSZ	15 July 1994 - 8 July 1998
Minister of Foreign Affairs		László Kovács	MSZP	15 July 1994 - 8 July 1998
Minister of Finance		László Békési	MSZP	15 July 1994 - 28 February 1995
Minister of Finance		Lajos Bokros	MSZP	18 February 1995 - 29 February 1996
Minister of Finance		Péter Medgyessy	Independent	29 February 1996 - 8 July 1998
Minister of Industry and Trade		László Pál	MSZP	15 July 1994 - 15 July 1995
Minister of Industry and Trade		Imre Dunai	Independent	15 July 1995 - 5 September 1996
Minister of Industry and Trade		Tamás Suchman	MSZP	5 September 1996 - 15 October 1996
Minister of Industry and Trade		Szabolcs Fazekas	Independent	15 October 1996 - 8 July 1998
Minister of Agriculture		László Lakos	MSZP	15 July 1994 - 15 December 1996
Minister of Agriculture		Frigyes Nagy	MSZP	15 December 1996 - 8 July 1998
Minister of Justice		Pál Vastagh	MSZP	15 July 1994 - 8 July 1998
Minister of Social Affairs		Pál Kovács	MSZP	15 July 1994 - 15 March 1995
Minister of Social Affairs		György Szabó	MSZP	15 March 1995 - 30 November 1996
Minister of Social Affairs		Mihály Kökény	MSZP	30 November 1996 - 8 July 1998
