= István Balsai =

Hungarian jurist and politician (1947-2020)

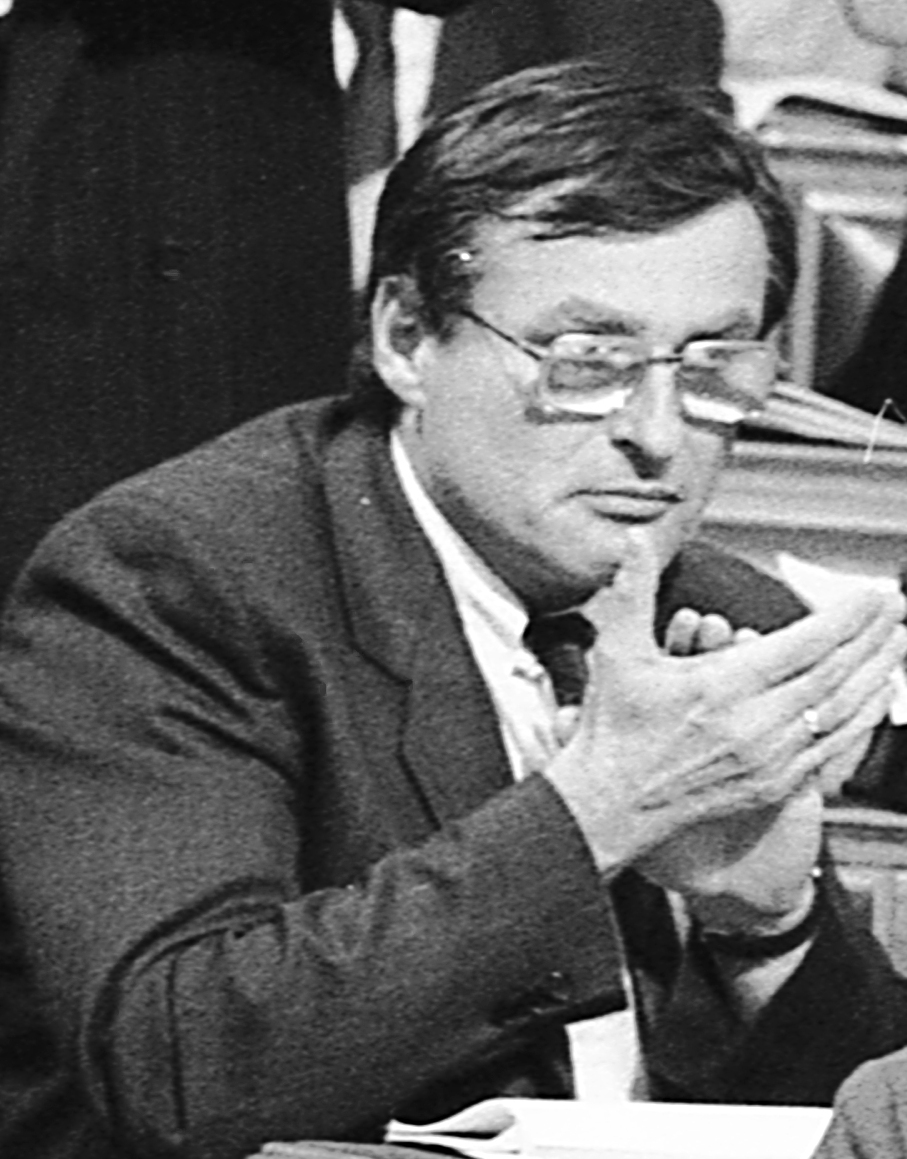
- István Balsai in 1990

Minister of Justice
- In office 23 May 1990 – 15 July 1994
- Preceded by: Kálmán Kulcsár
- Succeeded by: Pál Vastagh

Personal details
- Born: 5 April 1947 Miskolc, Hungary
- Died: 1 March 2020 (aged 72)
- Party: MDF (1988–2005); Independent (2005–2020)
- Children: Szabolcs; István
- Profession: politician, jurist

István Ákos Balsai (5 April 1947 – 1 March 2020) was a Hungarian politician and jurist, who served as minister of justice between 1990 and 1994. He was a member of Parliament from 1990 to 2011, when he was elected a member of the Constitutional Court of Hungary.

== Professional career ==
Balsai was born in Miskolc on 5 April 1947, the son of public prosecutor József Balsai (1915–1969) and teacher Mária Szalontai (1917–1991). His father participated in the Hungarian Revolution of 1956, as a result he was fired from his job and forced to work as a manual worker until his death. István Balsai finished his elementary and secondary studies in Budapest, where the family had lived since 1943. He earned a doctor of law at the Faculty of Law of the Eötvös Loránd University in 1972. He became a trainee lawyer in that year. He passed the special exam in 1974, and began to work for Budapest no. 21 Lawyer Working Community until the end of the Communist period. He worked as a private lawyer from 1995 to 2007.

István Balsai married lawyer Ilona Schmidt in 1973. They have two sons, Szabolcs (b. 1976) and István (b. 1982), both of whom are lawyers.

== Political career ==
He joined the Hungarian Democratic Forum (MDF) in September 1988. His party delegated him to the National Election Committee between 1988 and 1990, during the transition to democracy. He became a member of the National Assembly of Hungary, obtaining a parliamentary seat from the MDF's national list during the 1990 parliamentary election. He was appointed Minister of Justice in the first democratic Hungarian government led by József Antall. During his term as minister the first democratic fundamental laws were made. He maintained his position in the cabinet of Péter Boross too.

Balsai was re-elected MP from the MDF national list in the 1994 parliamentary election, when his party lost majority of the seats. He was a member of the leadership of the MDF in 1994 and between 1996–2003. He served as chairman of the party's Committee of Ethics from 1996 to 2005. Balsai was re-elected MP for the 2nd district of Budapest in 1998, 2002, 2006 and 2010. He was the leader of the parliamentary group between 1998 and 2002, while he also served as vice-president of the MDF from 2000 to 2001. Balsai functioned as the parliament's Employment and Labor Committee from 2002 to 2006. Balsai was an observer then full member of the European Parliament from 2003 to 2004, delegated by the Hungarian Democratic Forum. He sat in EPP group. He became a member of the Lakitelek working group which criticized the activity of the presidency and president Ibolya Dávid in June 2004. Later this group transformed as National Forum. Balsai was excluded from the MDF and its parliamentary caucus in 2005.

Balsai joined the Fidesz parliamentary group after six months. He ran as a Fidesz candidate in the 2006 parliamentary election, but did not join the party itself. After the 2010 parliamentary election, he was elected president of the parliament's Committee on Constitutional Affairs, Justice and Rules of Procedure. He was commissioned to investigate the unlawful measures during the 2006 protests in Hungary by Prime Minister Viktor Orbán in 2010. Balsai said in the report dated 15 March 2011 that the investigation had also uncovered possible grounds for raising the charge of the perpetration of an act of terror. The author said that it is necessary to investigate whether former prime minister Ferenc Gyurcsány should take political and legal responsibility for the police's behavior. "In the course of my investigation I came to the conclusion that October 23 [was] the symbol of the most grievous offenses … [and a symbol of] the Gyurcsány government's violent and paranoid exercise of power," Balsai wrote in the document. The full Balsai Report was published in September 2011.

He was elected to a member of the Constitutional Court of Hungary with the effect 1 September 2011. As a result, he resigned from his parliamentary seat and other political positions on 31 August 2011. He served in this capacity until his death. Balsai died on 1 March 2020 due to an incurable disease.

== Sources ==
- MTI Ki Kicsoda 2009, Magyar Távirati Iroda Zrt., Budapest, 2008, 63. old., ISSN 1787-288X
- Balsai István országgyűlési adatlapja
- Balsai István életrajza a Nemzeti Fórum honlapján

Political offices
| Preceded by Kálmán Kulcsár | Minister of Justice; 1990–1994 | Succeeded by Pál Vastagh |
National Assembly of Hungary
| Preceded by Ervin Demeter | Leader of the MDF parliamentary group 1998–2002 | Succeeded by Károly Herényi |
