= Democratic Community of Welfare and Freedom =

Democratic Community of Welfare and Freedom Jólét és Szabadság Demokrata Közösség
- President: László Sass
- Founded: 8 April 2011
- Dissolved: June 2023
- Preceded by: Hungarian Democratic Forum (MDF)
- Headquarters: 1092 Budapest, IX. Ferenc körút 8. Pincehely 1. ajtó
- Ideology: Liberal conservatism Christian democracy
- Political position: Centre-right
- Colours: Green, brown

Party flag

Website
- jesz.hu

The Democratic Community of Welfare and Freedom (Hungarian: Jólét és Szabadság Demokrata Közösség, pronounced [ˈjoːleːt ˈeːʃ ˈsɒbɒt͡ʃːaːɡ ˈdɛmokrɒtɒ ˈkøzøʃːeːɡ]), abbreviated to JESZ, was a centre-right political party in Hungary. It had a liberal conservative and Christian democratic ideology. The party was the legal successor to the Hungarian Democratic Forum (MDF). From 2014 to its eventual dissolution nine years later, the party became inactive.

== History ==
The Hungarian Democratic Forum (MDF), which had governed Hungary between 1990 and 1994, received only 2.67% of the vote and failed to win any parliamentary seat in the 2010 parliamentary election. Party president Ibolya Dávid immediately resigned and retired from politics. Upon her resignation, Károly Herényi served as interim party president until the congress on 10 June 2010, when Zsolt Makay was elected the new leader of the now extra-parliamentary MDF. In December 2010, the newly elected leadership decided to transform the party and adopted a new name, Welfare and Freedom (JESZ) on 12 December 2010. The party's congress approved the change of name in March 2011, as a result the Democratic Community of Welfare and Freedom (JESZ) was established officially on 8 April 2011.

The MDF had gained 5.04% of the vote and its list leader, the non-partisan economist Lajos Bokros was elected Member of the European Parliament (MEP) in the 2009 European Parliament election. Bokros was also the party's candidate for the position of prime minister during the 2010 national election. After the failure, all relationship has been lost between Bokros and JESZ, which called the politician several times in the upcoming years to give back his MEP mandate. Bokros refused this, thus the JESZ took legal action in that matter, demanding hundreds of millions HUF however it was rejected by the metropolitan court in the absence of a legal basis.

For the 2014 parliamentary election, the JESZ campaigned with stickers distribute to drivers in return for payment, but later these promised payments were not fulfilled in every case. In other cases, the party used the portraits of non-JESZ politicians in their posters without permission, including Zoltán Pokorni, Tímea Szabó, Bernadett Szél and Attila Chikán. As a result, the National Election Committee (NVB) imposed a fine of HUF 1.5 million. The party planned to run in the 2014 European Parliament election, however its registration was refused by the National Election Office (NVI) after it failed to collect required 20 thousand coupons.

== Leadership ==
Party leaders

- Zsolt Makay (2011–2015)
- László Sass (2015–2023)

== Election results ==
Election year	National Assembly				Government
Election year	# of overall votes	% of overall vote	# of overall seats won	+/–	Government
2014	9,925	0.2%	0 / 199		extra-parliamentary
