= Ernő Rozgonyi =

Hungarian economist, politician (1933–2018)

Member of the National Assembly
- In office 14 May 2010 – 5 May 2014
- In office 18 June 1998 – 14 May 2002

Personal details
- Born: 16 August 1933 Budapest, Hungary
- Died: 4 March 2018 (aged 84) Székesfehérvár, Hungary
- Party: KDNP (1989–93); MIÉP (1993–2003; 2013–18); MNSZ (2003–04); Jobbik (2004–12)
- Profession: economist, politician

Ernő Rozgonyi (16 August 1933 – 4 March 2018) was a Hungarian economist and right-wing politician, member of the National Assembly (MP) from 1998 to 2002 and from 2010 to 2014. He was a member of various right-wing political parties.

== Studies ==
Ernő Rozgonyi was born on 16 August 1933 in Budapest into a senior military family as the son of economist Dr. Ernő Rozgonyi, Sr. (1908–1993) and German-Italian language teacher Margit Tschan (1899–1980). After the World War II, the family landholdings were confiscated by the new Communist regime. Rozgonyi graduated from the Arts section of the Petőfi Sándor State Secondary School of 1st District of Budapest in 1951. Rozgonyi was not able to pursue university studies due to his bourgeois origin. After studying in the Eötvös Lóránd Geophysical Institute, he worked as a geodesist and tried unsuccessfully entrance exams to various universities in the next twelve years. Finally, in 1962, he was admitted to the night school section of the Financial and Accounting College (today a faculty of the Budapest Business School). He obtained an economist degree there in 1966. He earned the degree of auditor's qualification in June 1973.

== Career ==
=== During the Communist regime ===
He spent his military service between October 1953 and December 1956. His unit was locked in the barrack by officers of the National Air Defense and Air Force Command (OLLEP) during the Hungarian Revolution of 1956. Rozgonyi and his fellow soldiers were disarmed by the arriving Soviet Army on 4 November. He was discharged from the military on 5 December. He continued his work at the Maszolaj Geophysical Research Company and its successor organization National Petroleum and Gas Trust (OKGT) until March 1958.

Following that he worked for ÉM No. 44 State Construction Company as a technician since April 1958. After finishing his exam in 1966, he became an employee at the Ministry of Finance, where he participated in the draft of the New Economic Mechanism launched in 1968. He was a senior lecturer at the III. Industry and Construction Department. After the decline of the reformist movement and the New Economic Mechanism, Rozgonyi was charged of incitement against a community and was detained in September 1970. He was sentenced to a fine of 3,000 HUF by the Supreme Court. After 1974, he worked for the VI. Department of Transportation, Construction and Housing Policy. By 1984, his relationship with secretary of state Attila Madarasi has deteriorated for political reasons. As a result, he was relocated to the National Association of Co-operatives (SZÖVOSZ) and was appointed head of its Housing Co-operative Department in June 1984. He served as the last managing director of the disintegrating SZÖVOSZ from 1990 to 1992.

=== Political career ===
During the regime change, Rozgonyi joined the Christian Democratic People's Party (KDNP) in 1989, which became a coalition member in the government of József Antall. Minister of Finance Mihály Kupa appointed Rozgonyi as financial director of the Treasury Property Directorate in the spring of 1992. According to his own biography, Rozgonyi struggled unsuccessfully against the "excessive privatization of state goods", as a result he applied for retirement. In 1993, he also left his party and joined the newly formed right-wing nationalist Hungarian Justice and Life Party (MIÉP).

In the 1998 parliamentary election, Rozgonyi was elected a Member of Parliament from his party's national list. He served as a deputy leader of the MIÉP caucus throughout the parliamentary term and was vice-chairman of the Audit Committee until 2002. He was also involved in the Regional Development Committee (1999–2002) and the Committee on Employment and Labor (2001–2002). He was a member of that sub-committee which investigated the allegations of corruption within the Postabank. The MIÉP failed to win any seats in the 2002 parliamentary election. Rozgonyi left the party in 2003 and was a founding member of the Hungarian National Front (MNF) which soon integrated into the Hungarian National Alliance (MNSZ) electoral cooperation. After its failure in the 2004 European Parliament election and subsequent decay, Rozgonyi joined Jobbik in that year.

Rozgonyi was elected MP via the Jobbik's Fejér County Regional List in the 2010 parliamentary election. He worked in the Audit and Budget Committee (2010, 2011–2012) and the Economic and Information Technology Committee (2010–2011). On 5 December 2012, Rozgonyi announced he left the Jobbik party and quit its parliamentary group, continuing his career as an independent MP. He objected to the party's claimed "scandal policy" and lack of professionalism. In January 2013, Rozgonyi and fellow ex-Jobbik MP Zsolt Endrésik announced that they would henceforth represent the extra-parliamentary Hungarian Justice and Life Party (MIÉP) in the National Assembly. Technically, they remained independent MPs. Following his exit from Jobbik, Rozgonyi worked in the Committee on Sustainable Development until the end of the parliamentary term in 2014.

Rozgonyi was nominated the MIÉP's candidate for the position of finance minister for the 2018 parliamentary election. He would have run for an individual seat in Óbuda, but suddenly fell ill and died in the Székesfehérvár hospital on 4 March 2018, a month before the election.
