= Pensioners' Party (Hungary) =

Pensioners' Party Nyugdíjasok Pártja
- Leader: Vilmos Michaletzky
- Founded: 27 January 1990
- Dissolved: 14 March 2007 (as party)
- Ideology: Single-issue politics Pensioners' interests Christian socialism
- Political position: Centre-left

The Pensioners' Party (Hungarian: Nyugdíjasok Pártja; NYUP), was a minor political party in Hungary between 1990 and 2007.

== History ==
It was founded by the National Association of Pensioners' Associations within the Patriotic People's Front (HNF) under the name Party of Generations, Party of Pensioners and Families (Hungarian: Nemzedékek Pártja, Nyugdíjasok és Családosok Pártja) in January 1990. During its inaugural meeting, jurist Vilmos Michaletzky was elected leader of the party. The NYUP worked for the interests of pensioners, and the party mainly focuses on issues related to health care, taxes and pensioners' issues. The party also had a Christian socialist ideology. The NYUP supported the ideas of family tax benefit and housing subsidies.

Only one candidate of the party run in the 1990 parliamentary election, who received 0.04 percent of the individual votes, failing to obtain a mandate. However pharmacist and MP Imre Barcza, who had left the Alliance of Free Democrats (SZDSZ) caucus earlier, joined the NYUP in October 1992, providing parliamentary representation for the small party. Before the 1994 parliamentary election, the NYUP negotiated on electoral cooperation with the governing Hungarian Democratic Forum (MDF). Despite this the party's sole candidate gained only 0.02 percentage. For the 1998 parliamentary election, it joined the electoral alliance Union for Hungary, the NYUP had four candidates on the alliances' 80-member national list, but they did not reach the 5% election threshold.

The NYUP strongly criticized the electoral system which was not favorable for extra-parliamentary parties. Their petition was rejected by the Constitutional Court of Hungary. Before the 2002 parliamentary election, Michaletzky began to negotiate with the internal conflict-ridden Christian Democratic People's Party (KDNP) to ensure a successful cooperation, however the NYUP withdrawn when the KDNP entered a coalition with the Hungarian Social Democratic Party (MSZDP). Thus the party did not participate in the election. The NYUP joined the Hungarian National Alliance (MNSZ) which formed to contest the 2004 European Parliament election. On 27 April 2007, the NYUP transformed itself into a civil organization, called Family Protectional Association of Pensioners (NYCSE).

== Election results ==
=== National Assembly ===
| Election year | National Assembly | | | | Government |
| Election year | # of overall votes | % of overall vote | # of overall seats won | +/– | Government |
|---|---|---|---|---|---|
| 1990 | 1,762 | 0.04% | 0 / 386 | | extra-parliamentary |
| 1994 | 1,245 | 0.02% | 0 / 386 | 0 | extra-parliamentary |
| 1998 | Union for Hungary | | 0 / 386 | 0 | extra-parliamentary |

=== European Parliament ===
| Election year | # of overall votes | % of overall vote | # of overall seats won | +/- |
|---|---|---|---|---|
| 2004 | Hungarian National Alliance | | 0 / 24 | |

== Sources ==
- Vida, István (2011). "Nyugdíjasok Pártja (NYUP)". Magyarországi politikai pártok lexikona (1846–2010) [Encyclopedia of the Political Parties in Hungary (1846–2010)] (in Hungarian). Gondolat Kiadó. pp. 438–439. ISBN 978-963-693-276-3.
