= Péter Boross =

Hungarian politician (born 1928)

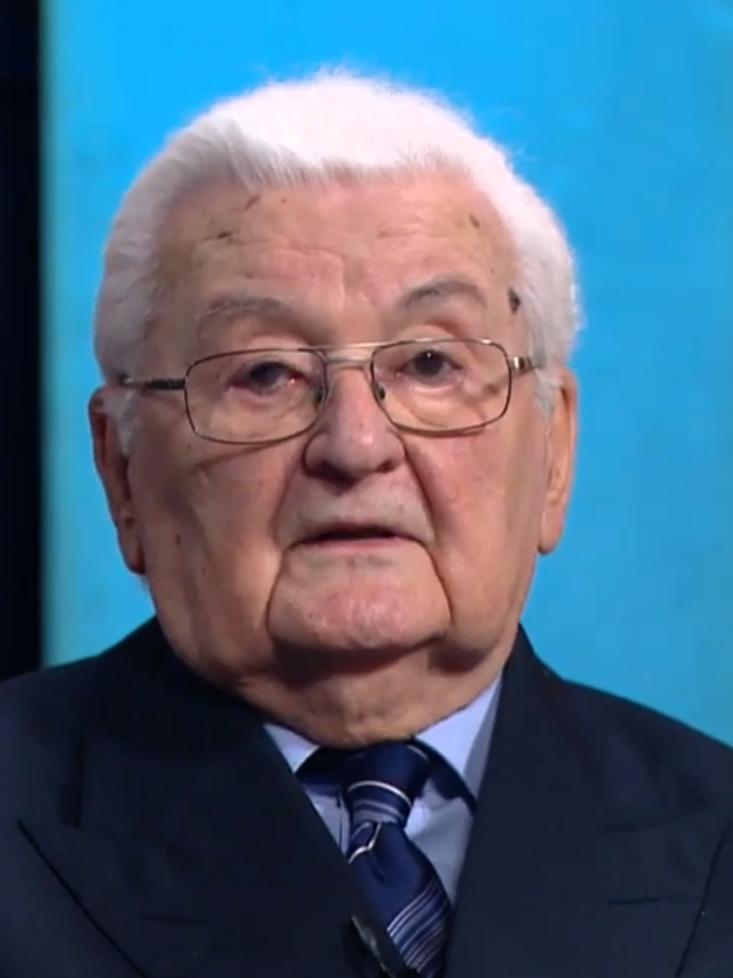
- Boross in 2020

Prime Minister of Hungary
- In office 12 December 1993 (Note: Acting until 21 December 1993) – 15 July 1994
- President: Árpád Göncz
- Preceded by: József Antall
- Succeeded by: Gyula Horn

Minister of the Interior
- In office 21 December 1990 – 21 December 1993
- Prime Minister: József Antall; Himself (acting)
- Preceded by: Balázs Horváth
- Succeeded by: Imre Kónya

Minister of Civilian Intelligence Services
- In office 19 July 1990 – 21 December 1990
- Prime Minister: József Antall
- Preceded by: Position established
- Succeeded by: András Gálszécsy

Member of the National Assembly
- In office 16 May 2006 – 31 January 2009
- In office 28 June 1994 – 17 June 1998

Personal details
- Born: 27 August 1928 (age 98) Nagybajom, Hungary
- Party: MDF (1992–2010)
- Spouse: Ilona Papp (m. 1952; died 2010)
- Children: 3
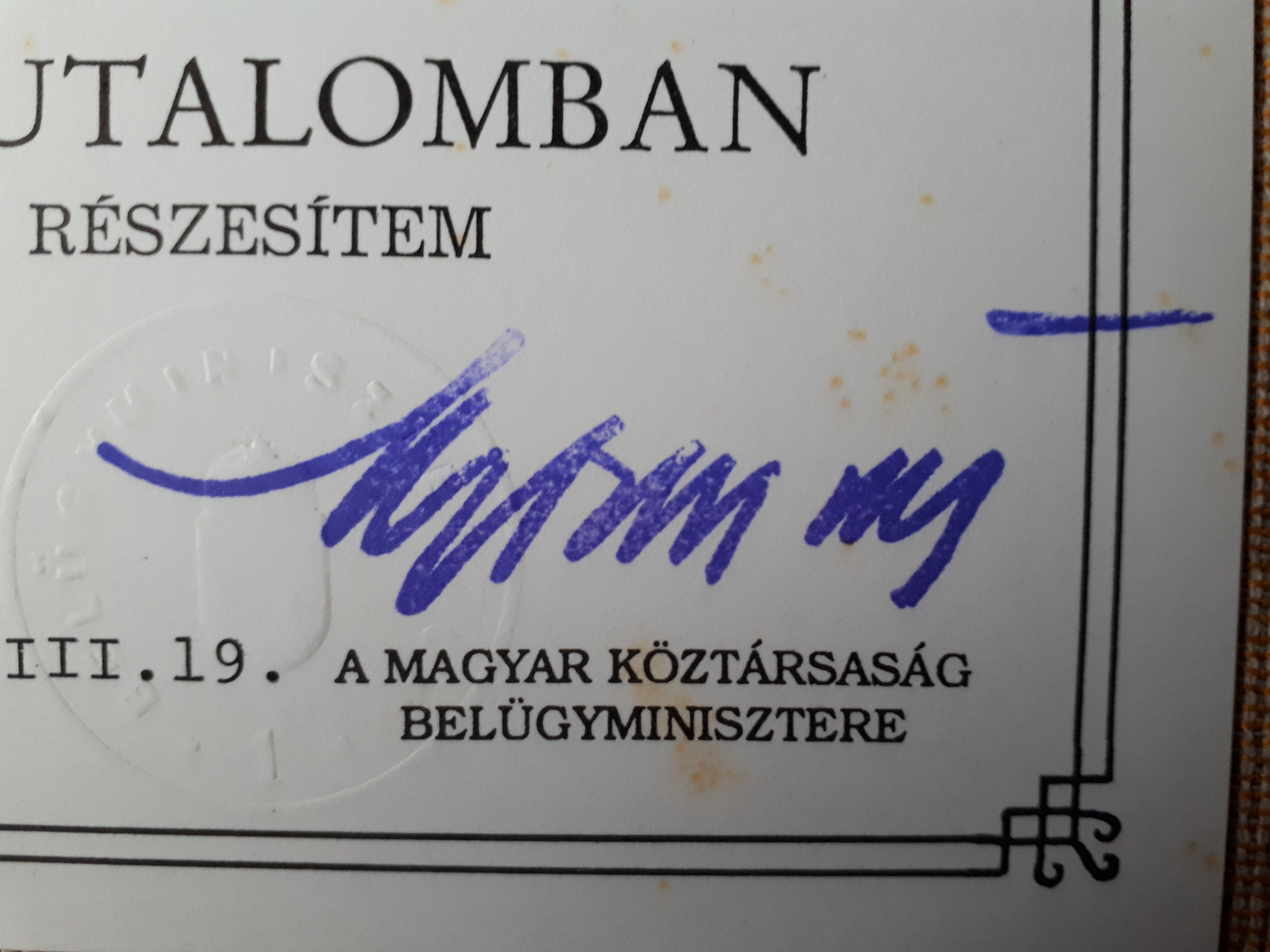
- Signature

Péter Boross (born 27 August 1928) is a Hungarian retired politician and former member of the Hungarian Democratic Forum (MDF) who served as Prime Minister of Hungary from December 1993 to July 1994. He assumed the position upon the death of his predecessor, József Antall, and held the office until his right-wing coalition was defeated in election by the Hungarian Socialist Party (MSZP), which was led by his successor Gyula Horn. Prior to his premiership, Boross functioned as Minister of Civilian Intelligence Services (1990) and Minister of the Interior (1990–1993). He was also a Member of Parliament from 1994 to 1998 and from 2006 to 2009.

== Early life (1928–1957) ==
Boross was born in Nagybajom on 27 August 1928, as the son of György Boross (1896–1993), who participated in the First World War from 1915 to 1918. Returning home, he became a member of the Order of Vitéz and was forest engineer at the Somssich estate. His mother, Lujza Horváth (1905–1993) came from a smallholder farming family, a distant branch of the extinct noble Perneszy family in Somogy County. She was fond of Hungarian literature and theatre, especially Sándor Márai's writings. Boross has a younger brother, László (born 1932), a teacher. The Boross children raised in their birthplace and Újvárfalva, where their wealthy step-grandmother lived. They finished six-grade elementary school in Újvárfalva. In 1938, Boross started his military secondary studies at Hunyadi Mátyás Honvéd Secondary School and Institution in Kőszeg, then attended the Zrínyi Miklós Honvéd Corps Cadet School in Pécs since 1942. As a result of the Soviet invasion during the closing period of the Second World War, the entire cadet school moved to Sopron at the end of 1944. From there, Boross was also transferred to Butzbach, Germany, however he successfully escaped and defected from the German Army. He returned to Hungary through Vienna. Boross finally took his school-leaving exam at Somssich Pál Secondary Grammar School in Kaposvár in 1947, with a year delay due to the Second World War.

Boross graduated as a jurist from the Faculty of Law, Eötvös Loránd University in 1951. There he was educated by professor Gyula Moór. After finishing legal education, Boross intended to become a lawyer, however the reputation and salary of the profession reduced during the Stalinist era, thus he began to work at the Metropolitan Council of Budapest. He was a lecturer at the Finance Department under the leadership of Ferenc Nezvál, who later served as Minister of Justice.

During the Hungarian Revolution of 1956, Boross was elected as a member of the Revolutionary Committee of Budapest and of the Revolutionary Council of the Intellectuals. As a result, he was fired from the Metropolitan Council in January 1957, following the crushing of the revolution. After that Boross worked as an unskilled worker in toy manufacturing. Finally, he was arrested for his role during the revolution in July 1957. After interrogations, he was transferred to an internment camp in Kistarcsa. Following his release soon after, Boross and his family were put under police surveillance in the forthcoming years until 1959.

== Entrepreneurial career (1957–1989) ==
Boross started his career in the catering industry as an inspector of stores in October 1957. However he was fired because of his past in 1956, and after that worked as a bartender in the Szikla Restaurant at Budapest Zoo and Botanical Garden. Some months later he moved to the Széchenyi thermal bath's buffet. In September 1958 he became assistant manager in a restaurant at Kőbánya (District X, Budapest). He became manager in 1961, and his financial conditions stabilized by that time. Then he also became group leader on trade in goods at the local Catering Company in 1962. In this capacity, Boross took part in the organization of tertiary training of professionals in the Hungarian hospitality sector and tourism.

Through the intercession of József Venesz, the most well-known chef in the Kádár regime, Boross was promoted to Deputy Director of the South-Pest Catering Company in 1965. During that time the company had two hundred catering units. The New Economic Mechanism, a major economic reform launched in 1968, was a "comprehensive reform of the economic system", creating market relationships among firms. On 21 December 1971, Boross became Director of the South-Pest Catering Company. He retired from this workplace and became a pensioner on 1 February 1989.

== Political career (1990–2010) ==
=== Government positions (1990–1993) ===
He had a longtime friendship with József Antall since the 1950s. After the 1990 parliamentary election, when the Hungarian Democratic Forum (MDF) beat the liberal Alliance of Free Democrats (SZDSZ) and formed a government, Prime Minister Antall requested Boross to become Political Secretary of State in the Prime Minister's Office. He was appointed to that position on 30 May 1990. Less than two months later after his appointment as Secretary of State, Boross was promoted to Minister without portfolio for Civilian Intelligence Services on 19 July 1990. In that capacity, he supervised the operations of the Office of National Security (NBH) and the Information Office (IH) internal security intelligence agencies. Among his first tasks was the removal of the communist secret service executives. The secret service under Boross did not disclose the hypothetic list of twenty-six former counterespionage officers in the III./III. section of the then Ministry of the Interior prior to 1989. According to former prime minister Miklós Németh, he handed over the list to his successor, József Antall. However Boross argued it was an unofficial document with "many inaccuracies and improvisation".

After the resignation of Balázs Horváth following the flawed management of the taxi drivers' anti-government blockade, Boross was appointed Minister of the Interior on 21 December 1990. Thus Boross became the first deputy of József Antall and the second-highest-ranking member of the right-wing conservative cabinet. In a later interview, Boross said that he considered Ferenc Keresztes-Fischer, the Interior Minister during the Horthy era, who acted against both the far-right and far-left movements, as his role model. As minister, Boross reorganized the structure of law enforcement organizations and dismissed Győző Szabó, the Chief of the National Police. He appointed the relatively young Sándor Pintér as Chief of the Budapest Police and a few months later as Chief of the National Police in 1991. His ministry has also developed the municipal law; Boross was advocate of more extensive decentralization, but the majority of his party rejected his amendment proposal. When protesters hissed and booed President Árpád Göncz (SZDSZ) on 23 October 1992, Boross and the government were accused of deliberate sabotage by the opposition. He rejected the claims. According to a 2014 report, it is possible that Antall and Boross knew about a potential provocation but they did not want to prevent it.

Boross was a non-partisan politician until 17 August 1992, when he officially joined the MDF. He became a member of the party's District II, Budapest branch. By early 1993, he was elected a member of the MDF's national board and also became one of the vice-presidents of the party. During Antall's severe illness, who had non-Hodgkin lymphoma, Boross performed the duties of prime minister temporarily from 6 October to 5 November 1993 and from 20 November 1993 to 12 December 1993, when Antall died. A day before his death, as a result of Boross' proposal, Antall was awarded Grand Cross of the Hungarian Order of Merit by President Árpád Göncz on 11 December 1993.

=== Prime Minister (1993–1994) ===
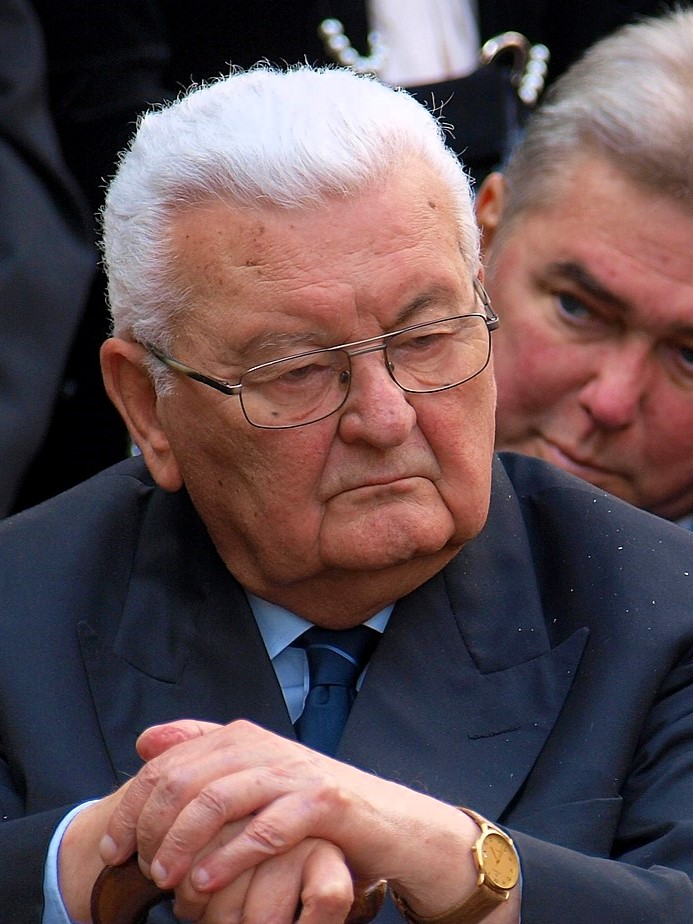
- Premiership of Péter Boross; 12 December 1993 – 15 July 1994; Acting: 12 December 1993 – 21 December 1993
- President: Árpád Göncz
- Cabinet: Boross Government
- Party: Hungarian Democratic Forum

Immediately after József Antall's death, Boross became acting prime minister of Hungary on 12 December 1993. On the following day, the Hungarian Democratic Forum's national board and the parliamentary group jointly convened, where three candidates, Péter Boross, Iván Szabó and Lajos Für ran for the position of prime minister. In the first round, Boross received 89 votes and came first place, defeating Szabó (79 votes) and Für (62 votes). In the second round, Boross gained two-thirds support against Szabó and was nominated as the party's designated premier. On 21 December 1993, the National Assembly elected Boross as prime minister by a vote of 201–152, with 5 abstentions. The parliamentary group leader Imre Kónya succeeded him as Minister of Interior but apart from that the personal composition of the government remained unchanged, as a result journalistic and academic works often refer to the MDF government between 1990 and 1994 as the "Antall–Boross cabinet".

In January 1994, Boross met with leaders of the Central-European post-communist countries in Prague, reflecting the 1994 Brussels summit where the United States expressed its intention to enlarge the NATO intergovernmental military alliance. Before the 1994 election, Viktor Chernomyrdin, the Prime Minister of Russia visited Budapest to discuss the issue of debt settlement. Boross also asked Chernomyrdin to talk with Slobodan Milošević for the interests of the Hungarians in Serbia during the Yugoslav Wars. In February 1994, Boross visited France where he held talks with President François Mitterrand and Prime Minister Édouard Balladur. In March 1994, he visited German Chancellor Helmut Kohl in Bonn.

Gyula Horn led the Socialists to a comprehensive victory in the 1994 parliamentary election. Although the MSZP had more than enough seats to govern alone, Horn wanted to allay concerns both inside and outside Hungary of a former Communist party winning an absolute majority. With this in mind, he went into coalition with the liberal and previously strong anti-communist Alliance of Free Democrats (SZDSZ), giving him a two-thirds majority. Boross was succeeded by Gyula Horn as Prime Minister of Hungary in July 1994.

=== After premiership (1994–2010) ===
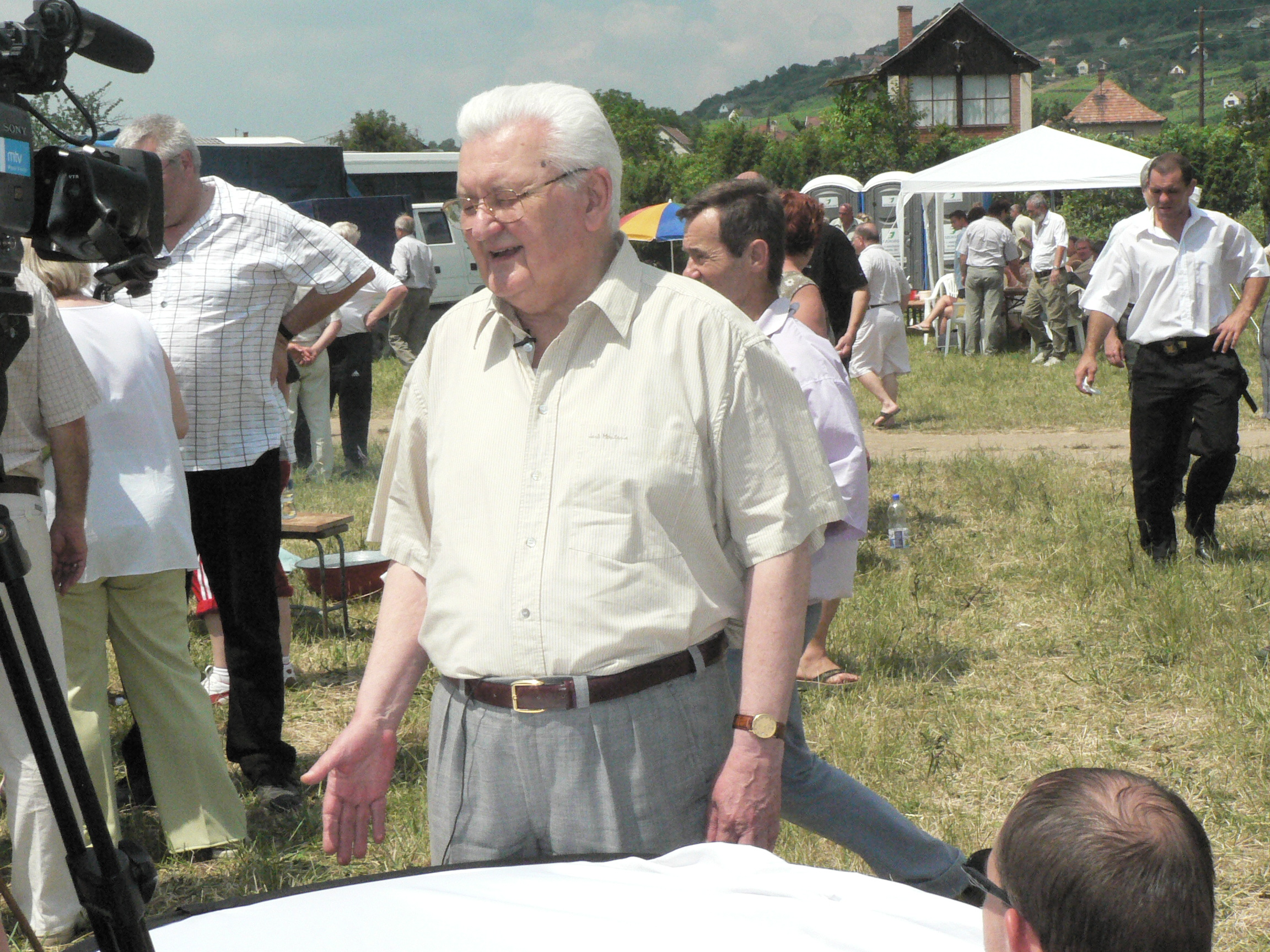
Péter Boross in 2006

At the 1994 parliamentary election, the MDF was severely defeated, falling from 165 seats to 38 for third place. Boross was elected Member of Parliament from his party's Budapest Regional List. He was appointed Chairman of the National Security Committee on 28 June 1994. He also became Vice Chairman of the Committee for Financial Support for Public Organizations on 27 December 1994, holding this position until 11 December 1995.

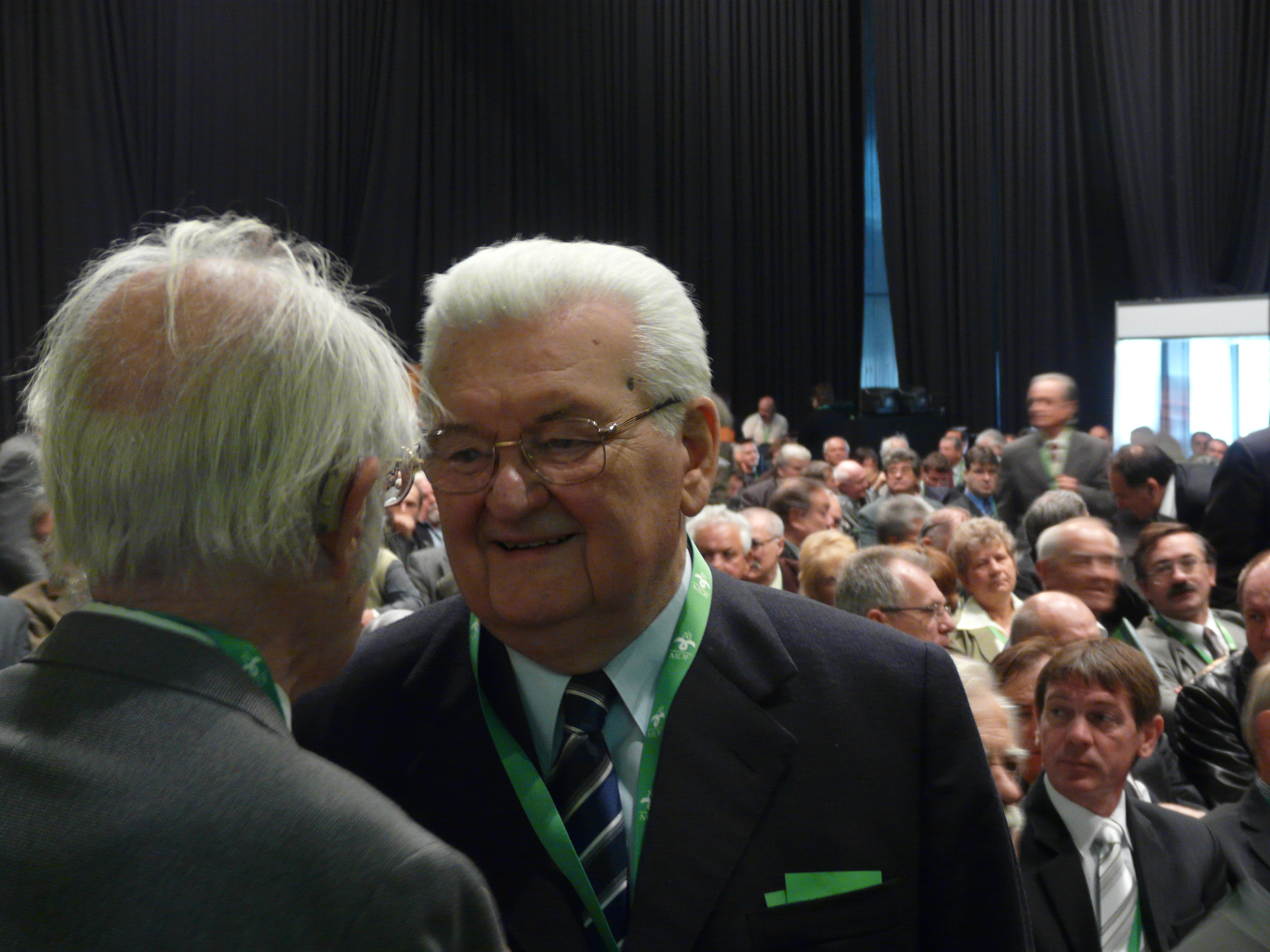
Boross at the MDF's 12th congress in September 2008

During the campaign for the 1996 party leadership election, Boross supported Sándor Lezsák who ran as a candidate along with the more liberal and urbanist Iván Szabó, who was more acceptable to the party elite and the former government members. At the end of 1995, Boross resigned as vice-president of the MDF because he disagreed with the policy of the party leadership chaired by Lajos Für. In March 1996, Lezsák was elected President of the Hungarian Democratic Forum, as a result Szabó and most of the governmental figures of the Antall period, including 15 MPs left the party and founded the Hungarian Democratic People's Party (MDNP). Boross resigned as Chairman of the National Security Committee following that, but remained a member of the MDF. He worked in the Committee for Constitutional Preparatory and Committee of Economics from April 1994 until the end of the parliamentary term in June 1998. Boross lost his parliamentary seat in the 1998 parliamentary election.

Boross served as political advisor to Prime Minister Viktor Orbán, whose party the Fidesz won the 1998 election; the MDF was also involved in the government as a coalition partner. Since then Boross was long considered a supporter of Minister of Justice Ibolya Dávid, who became leader of the MDF in January 1999, replacing Sándor Lezsák. Boross did not run again for the position of party vice-president during the election of officials. His relationship with Orbán became conflictual by early 2001, even after the replacement of ministers Attila Chikán and József Hámori. Boross also criticized the Orbán cabinet's economic policy and its biennial budget. In 2003, Boross left the MDF's national board. He was elected President of the National Memorial and Tribute Committee in 2006, replacing Anna Jókai who had held the position since 1999.

He was elected as a Member of Parliament from his party's Pest County Regional List during the 2006 parliamentary election. Before the election's second round, Boross argued the left-liberal MSZP–SZDSZ governing coalition's advantage is unbeatable, therefore he received much criticism from the right-wing intellectuals. He became a member of the National Security Committee following the election. In the upcoming years the MDF gradually shifted to the left-wing under the leadership of Ibolya Dávid. Boross was strongly opposed to the nomination of Socialist ex-minister Lajos Bokros to the head of the MDF party list during the 2009 European Parliament election. As a result, Boross resigned from his parliamentary seat on 31 January 2009. Due to his conservative party's shift to the left, resulting in the expulsion of several prominent party members, Boross decided to break all ties with the present party leadership on 13 June 2009. He finally left the party on 25 January 2010.

== Later life (since 2010) ==
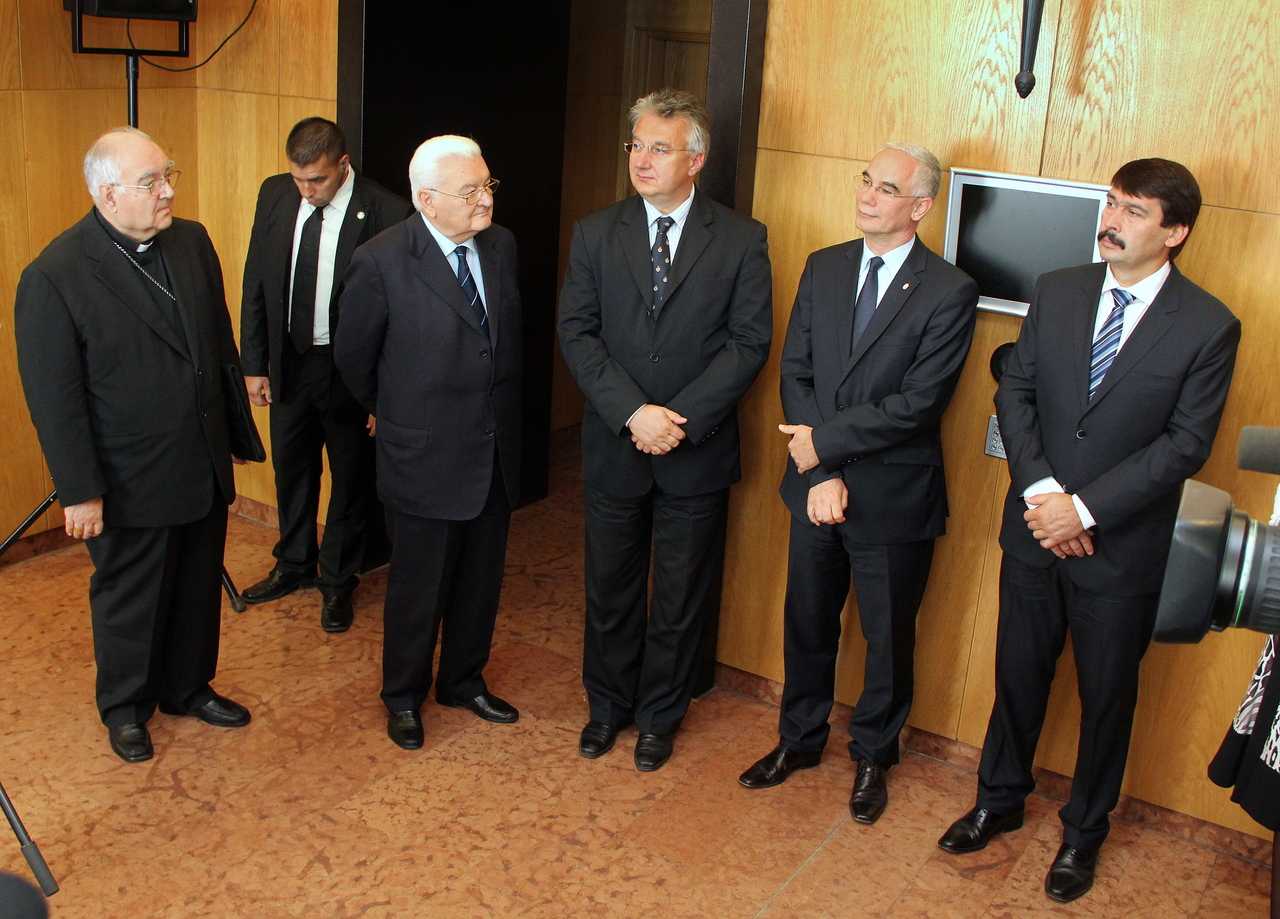
Boross with Hungarian president János Áder in 2012

On 6 June 2010, following the 2010 parliamentary election, when Fidesz won a two-thirds majority, he became a member of the board advising Prime Minister Viktor Orbán on the conceptual foundations of the new Hungarian constitution. In this capacity, Boross stated that he can envision a new constitutional government in the form of a kingdom. Furthermore, he said that it is necessary to place broader authority and more powerful political authority into the hands of the Prime Minister by way of the new constitution.

He gave a controversial interview to the weekly newspaper Heti Válasz in September 2010, when he said the government should inaugurate a so-called childlessness tax because, according to him, procreation is not just a private matter but also a matter of national interest. Several feminist groups criticized his statement and protested against Boross' remarks at the Kossuth Square.

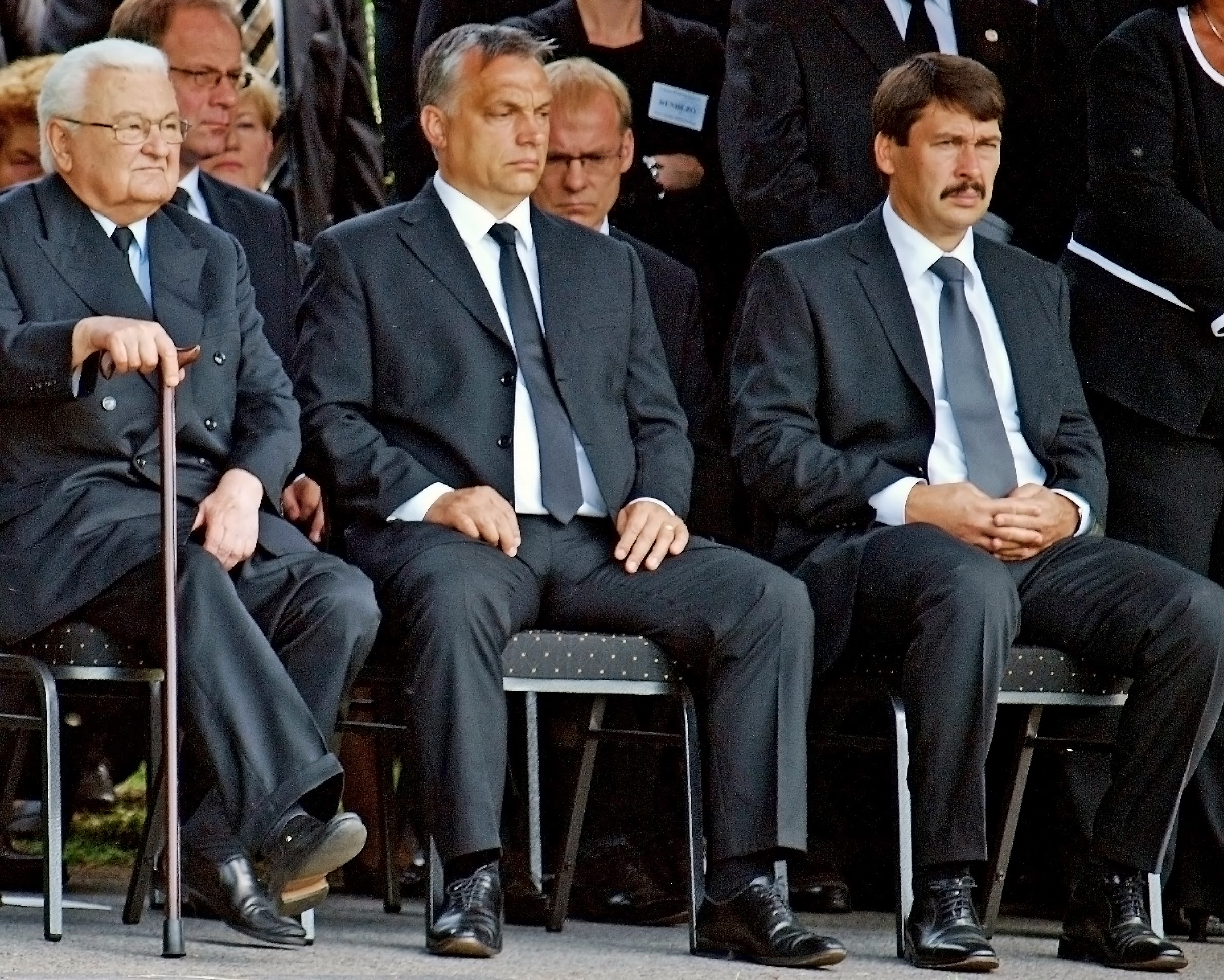
Boross, Orbán and Áder at the funeral of Gyula Horn in 2013

In August 2015, reflecting on the European migrant crisis, Boross claimed the mass immigration into Hungary was an "issue of race and ethnicity". He also expressed his sympathy with the erection of the Hungarian border barrier. In October 2015, he added in an interview that it is "tasteless foolness" to compare the current situation with the Hungarian refugees after the Revolution of 1956. Boross said the current migrants are "with different physiognomy from different continents". Because of his remarks, the National Media and Infocommunications Authority (NMHH) has launched an investigation against Boross. The NMHH did not consider Boross' remarks as exclusionary thus terminated the authority procedure in the absence of infringement against the former prime minister in February 2016.

Boross delivered a speech on the occasion of the 60th anniversary of the 1956 revolution. In response to the United States Department of State's statement concerning Hungarian media freedom and the "sudden closure" of the left-wing daily Népszabadság, he said "the 1956 revolution is a miracle of the twentieth century, and the American imperialists intend to insult our sacred day". He also referred that the last issue of Népszabadság was exhibited at the Newseum in Washington, D.C. "Maybe we should exhibit too a couple of items from the list of the heinous crimes of the American imperialists", he added.

== Personal life ==
Boross' father died in a household accident on 11 August 1993, aged 97. His mother, Lujza Horváth died five weeks later. On 13 September 1952, Boross married his former classmate, Ilona Papp, who worked as a judge. Their church wedding took place in the Szilágyi Dezső Square Reformed Church on 13 March 1953. She died on 31 July 2010. Their first-born child, Péter Jr. (1957–1958) died at the age of nine months in February 1958, not long after Boross' release from the prison. Following that they had two children, a daughter Ildikó (born 1958), who became a jurist, and a son Gábor (1960–2018), who worked as an agronomist, he died in February 2018.

== Bibliography ==
- Marinovich, Endre (2007). A kamikáze kormány második miniszterelnöke. Boross Péter 216 napja (in Hungarian). Éghajlat Könyvkiadó. ISBN 978-963-8729-82-8.
- Sereg, András (2007). Boross – Hadapródiskolától a miniszterelnöki székig (in Hungarian). Magyar Hivatalos Közlönykiadó. ISBN 978-963-9722-28-6.

Political offices
New title	Minister of Civilian Intelligence Services; 1990	Succeeded by András Gálszécsy
Preceded by Balázs Horváth	Minister of the Interior; 1990–1993	Succeeded by Imre Kónya
Preceded by József Antall	Prime Minister of Hungary; 1993–1994	Succeeded by Gyula Horn
