= Péter Olajos =

Hungarian politician (born 1968)

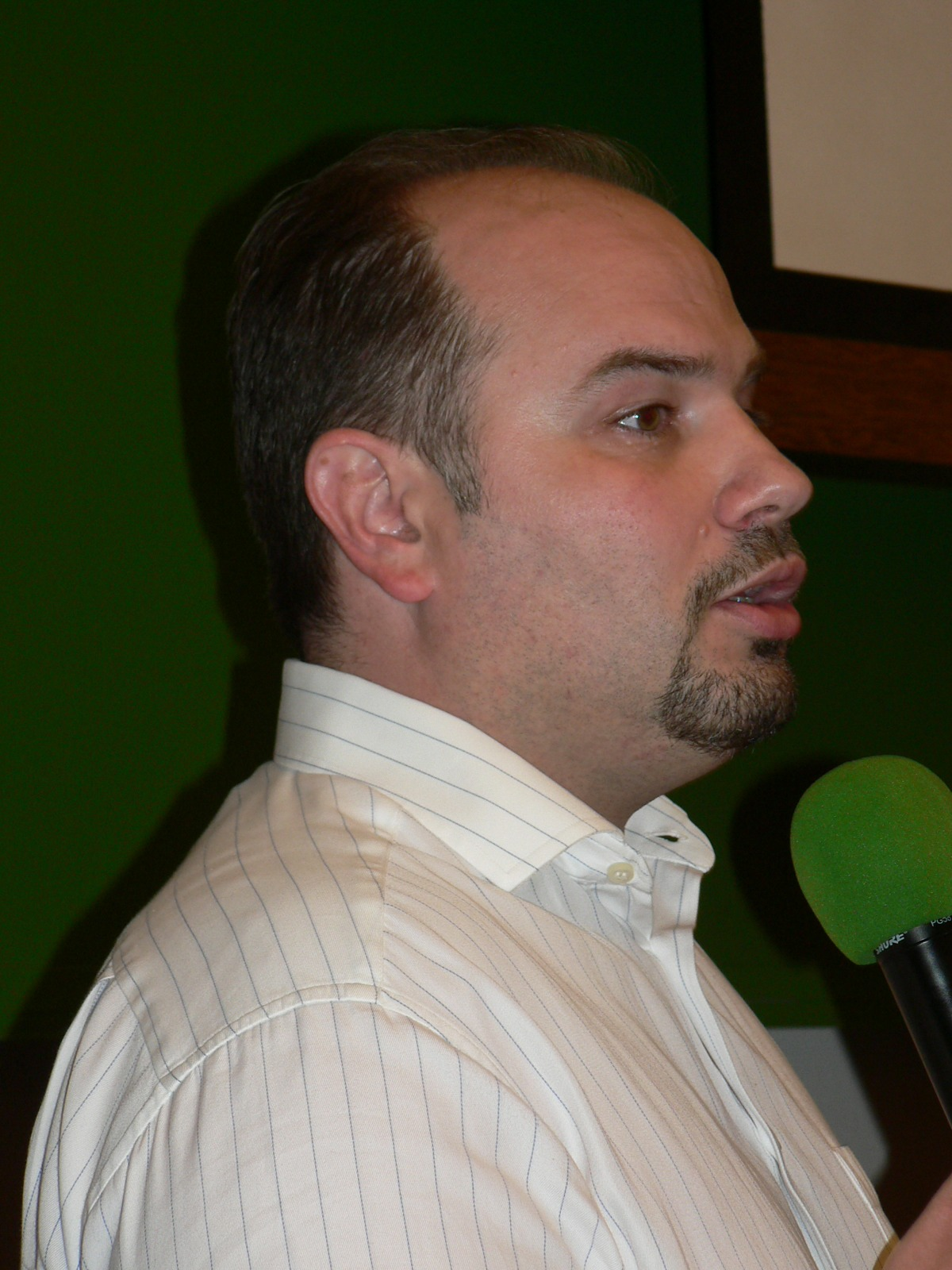
Péter Olajos in 2006

Péter Olajos (born 18 April 1968 in Budapest) is a Hungarian (conservative green) politician. From 2004 to 2009 he was a Member of the European Parliament (MEP) with the Hungarian Democratic Forum, part of the European People's Party. He sat on the European Parliament's Committee on the Environment, Public Health and Food Safety, later he was member second Orban Government, responsible for Green Economy Development and Climate Policy. He was the Hungarian Delegation Leader in Cancun on UNFCCC COP-16, and a head of the Hungarian Climate Team under the Hungarian EU Presidency in 2011.

In the European Parliament, Olajos was a substitute for the Committee on the Internal Market and Consumer Protection, a member of the Delegation to the EU-Kazakhstan, EU-Kyrgyzstan and EU-Uzbekistan Parliamentary Cooperation Committees, and for relations with Tajikistan, Turkmenistan and Mongolia and a substitute for the Delegation to the EU-Romania Joint Parliamentary Committee.

In the Government as Deputy State Secretary Olajos's main responsibilities were: Climate Policy, Clean Energy and Energy Efficiency, Building Retrofitting Programs, Green Innovations and Sustainable Development

== Education ==
- 1990: Industrial engineer (BSc)
- 1992: Chemical Engineer (MA)
- 1993: Master of Environmental Science and Engineering (MSc)

== Career ==
- 1994-1996: Head, Chairman's Secretariat, MDF party
- 1996-1998: Principal Private Secretary of MP Lezsák Sándor
- 1996-2004: Head, European Integration Office
- 1998-2000: Party director MDF
- 1999-2004: Member of Presidency of the board of trustees of Hungarian public broadcaster
- 2004-2009: Member of European Parliament (EPP-ED Group)
- 2010 Deputy-State Secretary of Ministry for National Economy in Hungary responsible for the Energy- and Climate Policy.
- 2011 Green Economy Development and Climate Policy Deputy State Secretary of Ministry of National Development in Hungary.

== Books ==
- 2011: “Green Conservativism” a book on the future politics and green economy, L’Harmattan Publishing House, Budapest, 2011.

== See also ==
- 2004 European Parliament election in Hungary
