= Imre Kónya =

Hungarian politician and lawyer

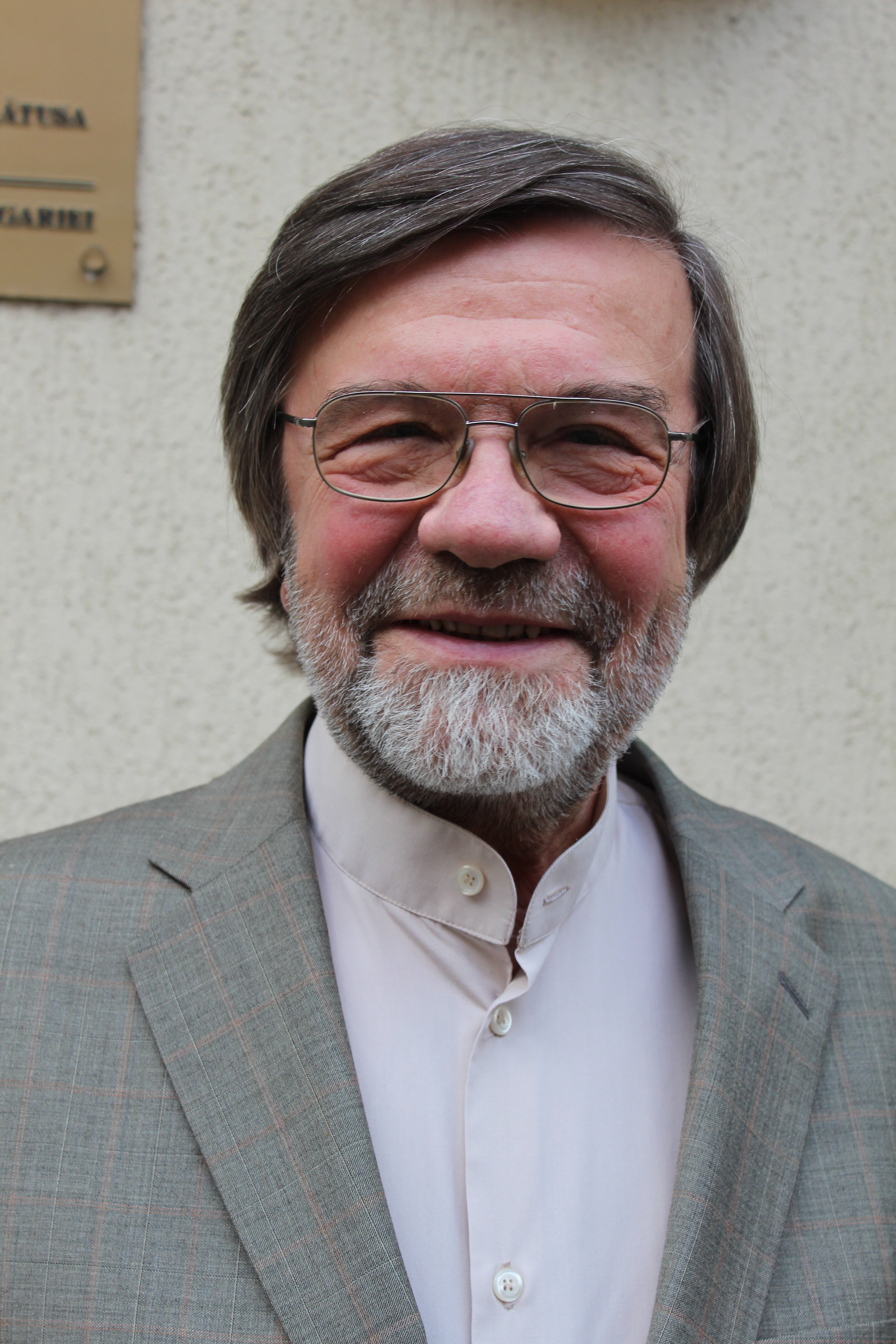
- Image: László Horváth

Minister of the Interior of Hungary
- In office 21 December 1993 – 15 July 1994
- Preceded by: Péter Boross
- Succeeded by: Gábor Kuncze

Member of the National Assembly
- In office 2 May 1990 – 20 December 1993

Personal details
- Born: 3 May 1947 (age 79) Budapest, Hungary
- Party: MDF
- Education: Eötvös Loránd University
- Profession: politician, lawyer

Imre Kónya (born 3 May 1947 in Budapest) is a Hungarian politician and lawyer, who served as Interior Minister between 1993 and 1994, in the cabinet of Péter Boross.

Between 1966 and 1971 he attended the Faculty of Law of the Eötvös Loránd University.

National Assembly of Hungary
| Preceded by First | Leader of the MDF parliamentary group 1990–1993 | Succeeded by Ferenc Kulin |
Political offices
| Preceded by Péter Boross | Minister of the Interior; 1993–1994 | Succeeded by Gábor Kuncze |
