= Pál Vastagh =

Hungarian politician and jurist

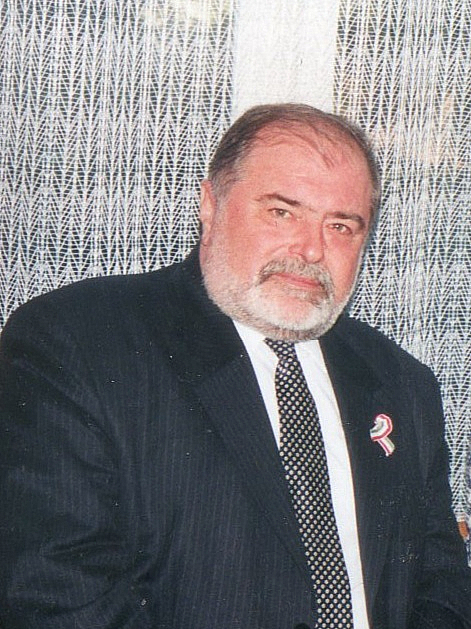

Minister of Justice of Hungary
- In office 15 July 1994 – 8 July 1998
- Preceded by: István Balsai
- Succeeded by: Ibolya Dávid

Member of the National Assembly
- In office 5 February 1990 – 28 June 1994

Personal details
- Born: 23 September 1946 (age 79) Nagyszénás, Second Hungarian Republic
- Party: MSZMP, MSZP
- Children: 3
- Profession: politician, jurist, diplomat

Pál Vastagh (born 23 September 1946) is a Hungarian politician and jurist, who served as Minister of Justice between 1994 and 1998. He joined to the Hungarian Socialist Workers' Party (MSZMP) in 1966. During the democratic changes in Hungary (1989–1990) he supported the communist rule and the Workers' Militia which Vastagh called the "people's army". In 1989 he was a founding member of the Hungarian Socialist Party. He became ambassador to Ottawa, Canada in 2006; as a result of that he resigned from his parliamentarian seat.

Political offices
Preceded by István Balsai	Minister of Justice; 1994–1998	Succeeded by Ibolya Dávid
