= András Gálszécsy =

Hungarian politician and jurist (1933–2021)

Minister of Civilian Intelligence Services
- In office 21 December 1990 – 29 February 1992
- Prime Minister: József Antall
- Preceded by: Péter Boross
- Succeeded by: Péter Boross

Personal details
- Born: 7 December 1933 Szekszárd, Hungary
- Died: 7 October 2021 (aged 87)
- Party: Independent
- Profession: politician, jurist

András Gálszécsy (7 December 1933 – 7 October 2021) (death announced on this date) was a Hungarian politician and jurist, who served as Minister of Civilian Intelligence Services of Hungary between 1990 and 1992.

Gálszécsy graduated from the Janus Pannonius University in Pécs. His family was deported from 1950 to 1953 to the Hortobágy. Until 1955 he worked as a soldier of the labour service. From 1956 he joined the Civil Engineering Company III as a workingman. Later he served in the Baranya County Construction Company as material manager. From 1966 he worked for the Labour Department of Budapest City Council as a jurist. Between 1971 and 1974 he was an instructor of the National Planning Board. After that he was head of a department at the Hungarian Central Statistical Office (KSH). From 1975 to 1979 he served as head of the State Population Registry. Till 1981 he was the Deputy Director of Banking Centre. Between 1981 and 1990 he served as marketing director at the Semmelweis University.

After the first democratic elections he served as high councillor of the Prime Minister's Office (August–December 1990). When Péter Boross became Minister of the Interior Gálszécsy was appointed Minister of Civilian Intelligence Services. He took the office until February 1992. After that he served as the senior advisor of Boross, who became Prime Minister in December 1993 when the previous premier József Antall died of cancer. He retired in 1994.

He served as Chairman of the Supervisory Board of Malév until 14 March 2007. Between 1995 and 1997 he was the deputy chairman of the Council of Procurement. From 1995 to 2001 he worked as the managing director of the Hungarian National Bank, since that he served as an advisor there until 2003.

András Gálszécsy died on 7 October 2021, at the age of 87.

== Works ==
- A birkahodálytól a parlamentig. Életinterjú; interviewer Várkonyi, Benedek, ed. Gyarmati, György; Állambiztonsági Szolgálatok Történeti Levéltára–Kronosz, Bp.–Pécs, 2018 (autobiography)

== Sources ==
- Biográf ki kicsoda (Budapest, 2003)
- Voks centrum - a választások univerzuma

Political offices
Preceded by Péter Boross	Minister of Civilian Intelligence Services; 1990–1992	Succeeded by Péter Boross
