= Gergő Balla =

Hungarian politician

Member of the National Assembly
- In office 14 May 2010 – 5 May 2014

Personal details
- Born: 21 February 1977 (age 49) Mezőcsát, Hungary
- Party: Jobbik (2007–?)
- Profession: metal lathe operator, politician

Gergő Balla (born 21 February 1977) is a Hungarian metal lathe operator and politician, who was the member of the National Assembly (MP) between 2010 and 2014, sitting as a politician of the far-right Jobbik.

== Biography ==
Balla was born in Mezőcsát on 21 February 1977. He passed the machine tool turning technician exam in 1993. He worked in this capacity at several jobs.

Balla joined Jobbik in 2007, heading its Tiszaújváros branch. He was also a member of the electoral board of the party's Borsod–Abaúj–Zemplén County branch. He was elected Member of Parliament from the party's Borsod–Abaúj–Zemplén County regional list in the 2010 Hungarian parliamentary election. He was a member of the parliament's Consumer Protection Committee from 2010 to 2014. After his election, Balla was one of four Jobbik MPs, who were removed from the Defense and Law Enforcement Committee because they had failed a vetting procedure that asked whether any MP's maintain contact with groups that engage in "activities that deny the basic principles of a state governed by the rule of law." He ran as the candidate of Jobbik in Tiszaújváros (Borsod-Abaúj-Zemplén County 6th constituency) during the 2014 Hungarian parliamentary election, where he came to second place after Fidesz candidate Roland Mengyi with 29.58 percent of the vote. He lost his parliamentary seat.
