= Péter Schön =

Hungarian politician

Member of the National Assembly
- In office 14 May 2010 – 5 May 2014

Personal details
- Born: 12 July 1977 (age 48) Budapest, Hungary
- Party: Jobbik (2004–2019)
- Profession: economist, politician

Péter Schön (born 12 July 1977) is a Hungarian economist and politician, who was the member of the National Assembly (MP) between 2010 and 2014, sitting as a politician of the far-right Jobbik.

== Biography ==
He is of Swabian and Austrian descent. He graduated from the Mihály Károlyi Vocational School of Economics and Foreign Trade in 1996. During his studies, he obtained a customs officer qualification, and after graduation, he obtained a higher foreign trade sales qualification at the same school in 1997. He studied economy at the Széchenyi István University in Győr. He worked for various financial advisory and investment firms in developing their financial IT systems.

Schön joined Jobbik in 2004, becoming its financial director. He served in this capacity until January 2019. He also headed the party's IT cabinet. The domains of Jobbik's dominant internet medium (for instance, jobbik.hu) were established under his guidance. He served as an external member of the Budget Committee of the 2nd district of Budapest from 2006 to 2007. He was a founding member of the Magyar Gárda in 2007.

Schön was elected Member of Parliament from the party's national list in the 2010 Hungarian parliamentary election. He was a member of the parliament's Economic and IT Committee from 2010 to 2014 and the Ad hoc committee on innovation and development from 2012 to 2014. After his election, Schön was one of four Jobbik MPs, who were removed from the Defense and Law Enforcement Committee because they had failed a vetting procedure that asked whether any MP's maintain contact with groups that engage in "activities that deny the basic principles of a state governed by the rule of law." He lost his parliamentary mandate in the 2014 Hungarian parliamentary election.

According to an investigation by the State Audit Office (ÁSZ) prior to the 2018 Hungarian parliamentary election, Jobbik accepted more than 331 million HUF in illegal campaign financing, for which it was fined 662 million HUF, which plunged the party into a serious financial crisis. In addition, it turned out that the subsidies received in exchange for the ÁSZ fine were used for campaign purposes during the election. In this case, Schön was accused by the pro-Fidesz media of corruption and accepting bribes from oligarch Lajos Simicska. Schön functioned as financial director until January 2019, when he resigned and left the party. Schön later won a privacy lawsuit against government media claims that they made false claims about Jobbik's finances during the election.
