= Zsolt Makay =

Hungarian politician (born 1977)

President of the Hungarian Democratic Forum
- In office 20 June 2010 – 8 April 2011
- Preceded by: Károly Herényi
- Succeeded by: party disestablished

Personal details
- Born: 16 August 1977 (age 48) Halmi, Romania
- Party: MDF, JESZ
- Occupation: politician

Zsolt Makay (born 16 August 1977) is a Hungarian politician who served as the last president of the Hungarian Democratic Forum.

Party political offices
Preceded by Károly Herényi	President of the Hungarian Democratic Forum; 2010–2011	Succeeded by party disestablished
