= Sándor Lezsák =

Deputy Speaker of the National Assembly of Hungary (born 1949)

Sándor Lezsák MP
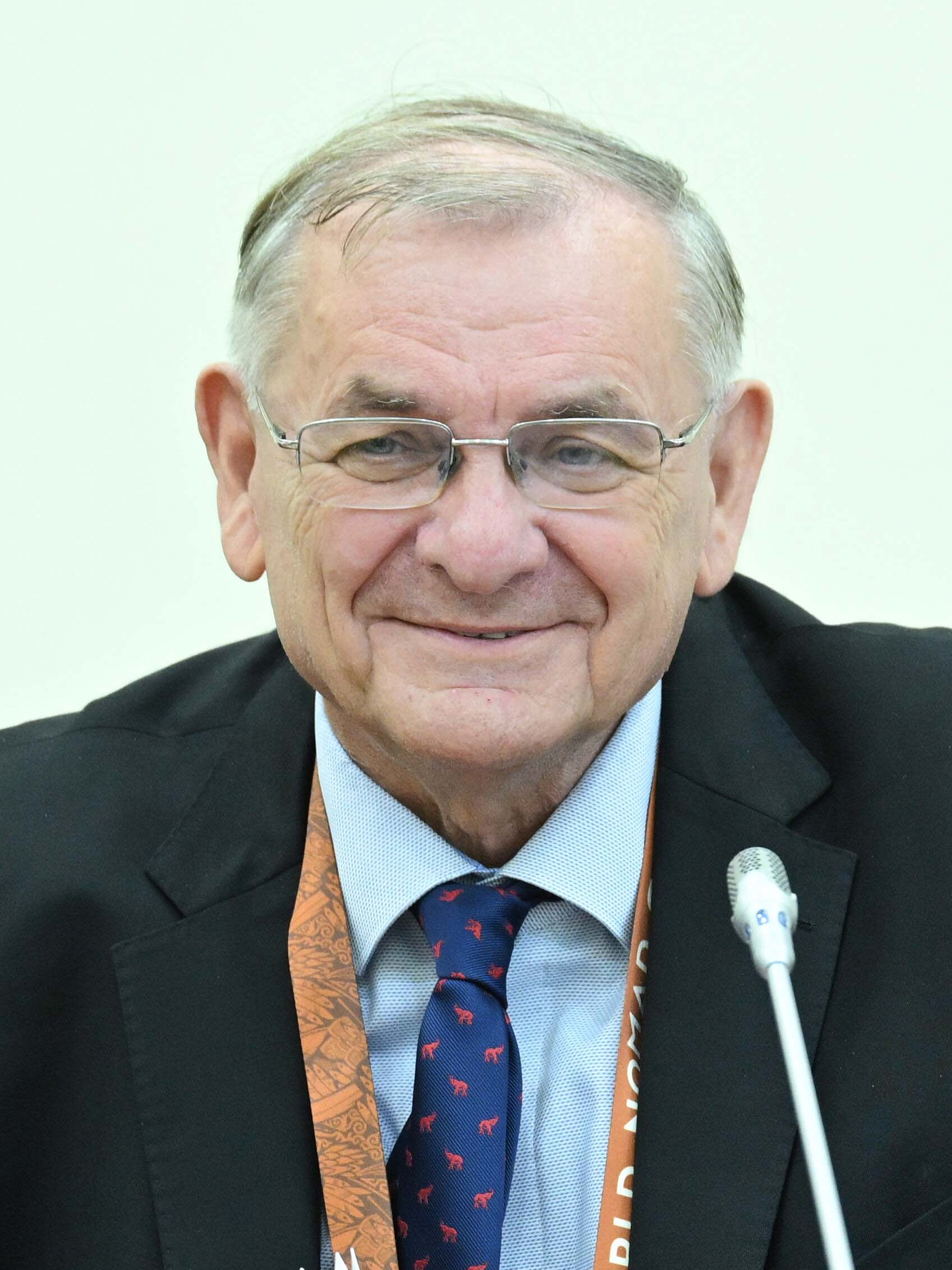
- Lezsák in 2024

Deputy Speaker of the National Assembly
- In office 8 June 2006 – 8 May 2026

Speaker of the National Assembly Acting
- In office 26 February 2024 – 5 March 2024
- Preceded by: László Kövér
- Succeeded by: László Kövér
- In office 2 April 2012 – 10 May 2012
- Preceded by: László Kövér
- Succeeded by: László Kövér

Member of the National Assembly
- In office 28 June 1994 – 8 May 2026

Personal details
- Born: 30 October 1949 (age 76) Kispest, Hungary
- Party: MDF, National Forum (Fidesz-ally)
- Spouse: Gabriella Sütő
- Children: Gabriella; Levente; Anna
- Profession: politician

Sándor Lezsák (born 30 October 1949) is a Hungarian poet, teacher and politician. Between 2 April 2012 and 10 May 2012, Lezsák was temporarily the Speaker of the National Assembly of Hungary, as the resignation of Pál Schmitt led to Speaker László Kövér becoming acting President of Hungary. Once again Lezsák 26 February 2024 to 5 March 2024 temporarily became the speaker of the National Assembly, as the resignation of Katalin Novák led Speaker László Kövér becoming acting President of Hungary.

== Teaching and literary career ==
He was born in Kispest on 30 October 1949. He graduated Madách Imre Secondary School, Budapest in 1968. Between 1969 and 1974 he worked as a support teacher in the school for children living in farmsteads in the Lakitelek area. He graduated in Hungarian literature and language and history from the Szeged Teacher Training College in 1975. He was a primary school teacher from 1974.

He worked as a desk officer for, and led the drama group of, the community centre in Lakitelek between 1969 and 1985. From 1979 to 1985, he was the non-Budapest secretary of the Bethlen Gábor Foundation. He has published two books of poems and written the lyrics of a rock opera to which Levente Szörényi composed music. One of his plays was staged several times and he has received numerous literary awards.

He has been the chair of board of Lakitelek Foundation since 1991. He founded the Lakitelek People's Academy, which received the Hungarian Heritage Award in 2003. He has been deputy executive president of the Cardinal Mindszenty Society since March 2004.

== Political career ==
The Hungarian Democratic Forum (MDF) was founded in his garden on 27 September 1987. Between 1989 and 1990 he was responsible for the Forum's election campaign. He was a member of its presidium since 1988. Between 1993 and 1994 he was managing deputy chairman, from 2 March 1996 to 30 January 1999 he was president, and since then, he was vice president of the Hungarian Democratic Forum until he was excluded from his party. He was an MP since April 1994 (1994: county list, 1998 and 2002: Constituency 3, Tiszakécske, Bács-Kiskun County).

From September 1996 to June 1998, and from September 1998 to May 2002, he was Parliamentary faction Leader of the Hungarian Democratic Forum. In the Parliament between 1998 and 2002, he was chairman of the Education and Science Committee.

Since 15 May 2002, he has been a member of the Tourism Committee and deputy chairman of the Cultural and Press Committee. Since 22 September he chaired the Temporary Committee on Closing of Nurseries and Schools. In the local elections on 20 October 2002, he was elected representative to the Bács-Kiskun County Assembly, where he became co-chairman of the Cultural and Church Committee.

On 21 June 2004, soon after the European Parliament elections, he established the Lakitelek Working Group to represent a specific political platform. He was excluded from MDF faction on 27 October 2004. From the announcement of the exclusion in the plenary sitting he continued as an independent MP and because of that he had to part with his committee membership on 20 December.

He secured a seat in Parliament in the 2006 general elections from the Bács-Kiskun county III constituency. He is a member of the Committee on National Security. He was elected deputy speaker of the National Assembly on 8 June 2006. He was re-elected as MP for Kiskunfélegyháza in 2010, 2014, 2018 and 2022, and also retained his position of deputy speaker. He was defeated by Tisza candidate Gyula Kovács in the 2026 Hungarian parliamentary election. Although he secured a mandate from Fidesz–KDNP joint national list, he was forced to give up his parliamentary seat by the party's presidium. Nevertheless, his daughter Anna Lezsák won a mandate.

Party political offices
Preceded by Lajos Für	President of the Hungarian Democratic Forum; 1996–1999	Succeeded by Ibolya Dávid
