= Károly Herényi =

Hungarian politician (born 1950)

President of the Hungarian Democratic Forum
- In office 11 April 2010 – 20 June 2010
- Preceded by: Ibolya Dávid
- Succeeded by: Zsolt Makay

Personal details
- Born: 2 December 1950 (age 75) Budapest, Hungary
- Party: MDF
- Spouse: Erzsébet Herényiné Nagy
- Children: Lilla; Gyöngyvér and two daughters
- Occupation: politician

Károly Herényi (born 2 December 1950) is a Hungarian politician who served as acting president of the Hungarian Democratic Forum after the 2010 parliamentary election.

== Personal life ==
He is married to Erzsébet Herényiné Nagy, and have four daughters together.

National Assembly of Hungary
| Preceded by István Balsai | Leader of the MDF parliamentary group 2002–2009 | Succeeded by Last |
Party political offices
| Preceded by Ibolya Dávid | President of the Hungarian Democratic Forum; Acting; 2010 | Succeeded by Zsolt Makay |
