= Hungarian National Alliance =

Political party in Hungary (2003–2004)

Hungarian National Alliance Magyar Nemzeti Szövetség
- President: Gyula Balogh
- Founded: 21 December 2003
- Dissolved: June 2004
- Ideology: National conservatism
- Political position: Right-wing

The Hungarian National Alliance (Hungarian: Magyar Nemzeti Szövetség; MNSZ) was a short-lived electoral coalition in Hungary, formed in December 2003 by minor right-wing parties and movements to jointly contest the 2004 European Parliament election, the first in Hungary.

== History ==
The alliance was founded by independent MP Gyula Balogh, who had been a member of the Independent Smallholders' Party (FKGP) and Fidesz. He left the latter's parliamentary group in May 2003. Some members of the FKGP, Hungarian Justice and Life Party (MIÉP) and the entire Hungarian Entrepreneurs' Unity Party (MAVEP), the Pensioners' Party (NYUP), the Renewed Independent Smallholders' Party (MFKGP), the Party for a Healthy Hungary (EMP) and many civil organizations also joined the electoral coalition. The cooperation negotiations with the Social Democratic Party (SZDP) remained unsuccessful.

In its programme, the MNSZ emphasized the protection of Hungarian soil, the granting dual citizenship to the ethnic Hungarians in the neighboring countries and preventing the privatization of hospitals. The MNSZ was able to gather the required number of signatures to the participation in the EP election. On 13 June 2004, the MNSZ received 20,226 votes (0.66%) and gained no seats. Two days before the election, alliance leader Gyula Balogh turned to the National Election Committee (OVB), because, according to him, the national broadcasters violated the principle of equality of opportunity, but his petition has been rejected. Shortly after the EP election, the MNSZ collapsed.

== Election results ==
=== European Parliament ===
Election year	# of overall votes	% of overall vote	# of overall seats won	+/-
2004	20,226	0.66% (#7)	0 / 24	

== Sources ==
- Vida, István (2011). "Magyar Nemzeti Szövetség (MNSZ)". Magyarországi politikai pártok lexikona (1846–2010) [Encyclopedia of the Political Parties in Hungary (1846–2010)] (in Hungarian). Gondolat Kiadó. pp. 404–405. ISBN 978-963-693-276-3.
