= Hungarian Democratic Forum =

Political party in Hungary (1987–2011)

Hungarian Democratic Forum Magyar Demokrata Fórum
- Abbreviation: MDF
- First leader: Zoltán Bíró
- Last leader: Zsolt Makay
- Founded: 27 September 1987
- Dissolved: 8 April 2011
- Succeeded by: Democratic Community of Welfare and Freedom (JESZ)
- Headquarters: 1025 Budapest, Szilágyi Erzsébet fasor 73.
- Newspaper: Magyar Fórum (1988–1993)
- Youth wing: Youth Democratic Forum
- Ideology: Christian democracy; Conservatism; Hungarian nationalism; National conservatism; Right-wing populism
- Political position: Centre-right
- European affiliation: European People's Party (2004–2009); Alliance of European Conservatives and Reformists (from 2009)
- European Parliament group: European People's Party–European Democrats (2004–2009); European Conservatives and Reformists (from 2009)
- International affiliation: Centrist Democrat International
- Colours: Green

Website
- mdf.hu

The Hungarian Democratic Forum (Hungarian: Magyar Demokrata Fórum [ˈmɒɟɒr ˈdɛmokrɒtɒ ˈfoːrum], MDF) was a centre-right political party in Hungary. It had a Hungarian nationalist, national-conservative, Christian-democratic ideology. The party was represented continuously in the National Assembly from the restoration of democracy in 1990 until 2010. It was dissolved on 8 April 2011.

The MDF was the largest party on Hungary's emergence as a democratic country under the leadership of József Antall, Prime Minister between 1990 and 1993. Since then, its representation receded, with the party playing the role of junior coalition partner to Fidesz from 1998 to 2002, and in opposition otherwise.

It was a member of the Centrist Democrat International and was a member of the European People's Party until 2009, when it joined the Alliance of European Conservatives and Reformists. The MDF's first MEP, Péter Olajos, was a member of the European People's Party–European Democrats group from 2004 to 2009, while Lajos Bokros sat with the European Conservatives and Reformists from 2009 in the European Parliament.

== History ==
=== Foundation ===
The Hungarian Democratic Forum was founded in autumn of 1987, during the one-party rule of the Hungarian Socialist Workers' Party (MSzMP). Its first meeting was in the village of Lakitelek in southern Hungary on 27 September 1987. Initially it was rather a loose political movement than a party.

Its founders were mostly nationally minded intellectuals, including Sándor Csoóri, Zoltán Bíró, István Csurka and Sándor Lezsák. They stood in the ideological tradition of the népi-nemzeti ("populist-" or "rural-national") movement, which has been opposed to the urbánus ("urbanist") school of thought since the end of the 19th century. The Forum focused on national and cultural traditions, aimed at radically democratic grassroots politics and a "third way" between capitalism and communism. One of the issues that bothered them was the menacing situation of the ethnic Hungarian minority in neighbouring Romania under Nicolae Ceaușescu.

Its opposition against the communist rule was more moderate than the mostly urban and pro-Western liberal Alliance of Free Democrats (SzDSz) and Alliance of Young Democrats (FiDeSz), that were created shortly after. Unlike them, the MDF sought an alliance with reform-oriented elements within the MSzMP, namely the politburo-member Imre Pozsgay, who had participated in the Lakitelek meeting and who was then secretary-general of the Patriotic People's Front (HNF), the umbrella organisation of the communist-aligned mass organisations. The Forum was seen as a "constructive" opposition and not as great a danger as the Free Democrats around János Kis.

=== Time of upheaval (1988–1989) ===
At a second meeting in Lakitelek, one year after the first, the Hungarian Democratic Forum announced its foundation. This was made possible by the Association and Assembly Act of September 1988. In order not to be diminished by a "divide and rule" tactic, the different oppositional groups joined in the "Opposition Round Table talks" in March 1989. They participated in the tripartite National Round Table with MSzMP and mass organisations beginning in June 1989.

The Round Table could not solve all contentious points. In particular, there was discord among the oppositional parties if direct presidential elections should be held before the end of the year. The MSzMP had transformed into the Hungarian Socialist Party (MSzP) in October 1989 and Imre Pozsgay was considered a strong contender in direct presidential elections. Given its good relations with Pozsgay, the MDF did not oppose this possibility. Free Democrats and Fidesz, on the other hand, wanted to prevent a directly elected, Socialist president at any rate and therefore called for a referendum, that was held in November 1989. The SzDSz heavily attacked the MDF as "the Communists' friends" or "collaborators". While the proponents of the referendum suggested that parliamentary elections should be held first, the MDF supported direct presidential elections and therefore called for a "no" in this question. Eventually, the "yes" campaign won by a narrow margin.

In October 1989 the party voted József Antall to be its president. With Antall's taking over from founding president Zoltán Bíró, the MDF shifted gradually away from the népi-nemzeti principles in their pure form. Antall represented a broadly national-liberal or liberal-conservative tendency, opening the party for a wider political spectrum and social base, especially the national-minded and Christian middle class. It transformed into a right-of-centre "omnibus" party, or even a "catch-all party".

=== Government period (1990–1994) ===
In March and April 1990, the MDF won the first free parliamentary elections after the end of Communism in Hungary with 24.7% of the votes and 164 of 386 seats. It formed a centre-right government coalition with the ideologically close Independent Smallholders Party (FKgP) and Christian Democratic People's Party (KDNP). József Antall became prime minister.

The MDF was now divided in two major internal tendencies. The dominant one was Antall's government circle, characterised by pragmatic, liberal conservatism, constitutionalism and legalism. The Antall government carried important reforms through that completed Hungary's transition from communist rule, e.g. laws on local administration, the status of civil servants and redemption of the old regime's wrongs. Still, traditional and religious values and national ideas played a greater role in the MDF's rhetorics than in its conservative and Christian democratic counterparts in Western European countries.

The right-wing, radically populist and national faction within the party was characterised by vocal anti-communism as well as anti-liberalism. Its proponents called for a systematic "cleansing" of public positions from former communists, demanded the sacking of supposedly "un-national" responsibles at TV and radio stations, and also attacked the liberal SzDSz, which they viewed as "cosmopolitan", "liberal-bolshevik" and "Jewish" and therefore incompatible with the ordinary Hungarians' mindset. After 1992, the distance of the national radicals to the moderate governmental wing grew progressively, and in 1993 most of them led by István Csurka left the party to found far-right parties, most notably the Hungarian Justice and Life Party (MIÉP).

After Antall's death in December 1993, he was succeeded by his party colleague Péter Boross, who led the government until the parliamentary election of May 1994.

=== Alliance with Fidesz (1994–2006) ===
The 1994 poll brought a devastating defeat for the MDF which dropped to 12.0% of the votes and 38 seats, putting it on a distant third place behind the resurged Socialists and the liberal SzDSz. While in opposition, internal quarrels continued and intensified between conservatives, like Boross and Sándor Lezsák, and centrists around Iván Szabó. After Lezsák won the leadership vote in 1996, Szabó and most of the governmental figures of the Antall period left the party and founded the Hungarian Democratic People's Party (MDNP). In the 1998 parliamentary election, both parties performed very disappointingly (MDF: 2.8%; MDNP: 1,3%). However, the MDF had fielded joint candidates with Fidesz – that had turned from liberal to conservative after 1994 – in some constituencies and thus secured 17 seats in parliament. The party joined a Fidesz-led coalition government under Prime Minister Viktor Orbán which also included the Smallholders Party.

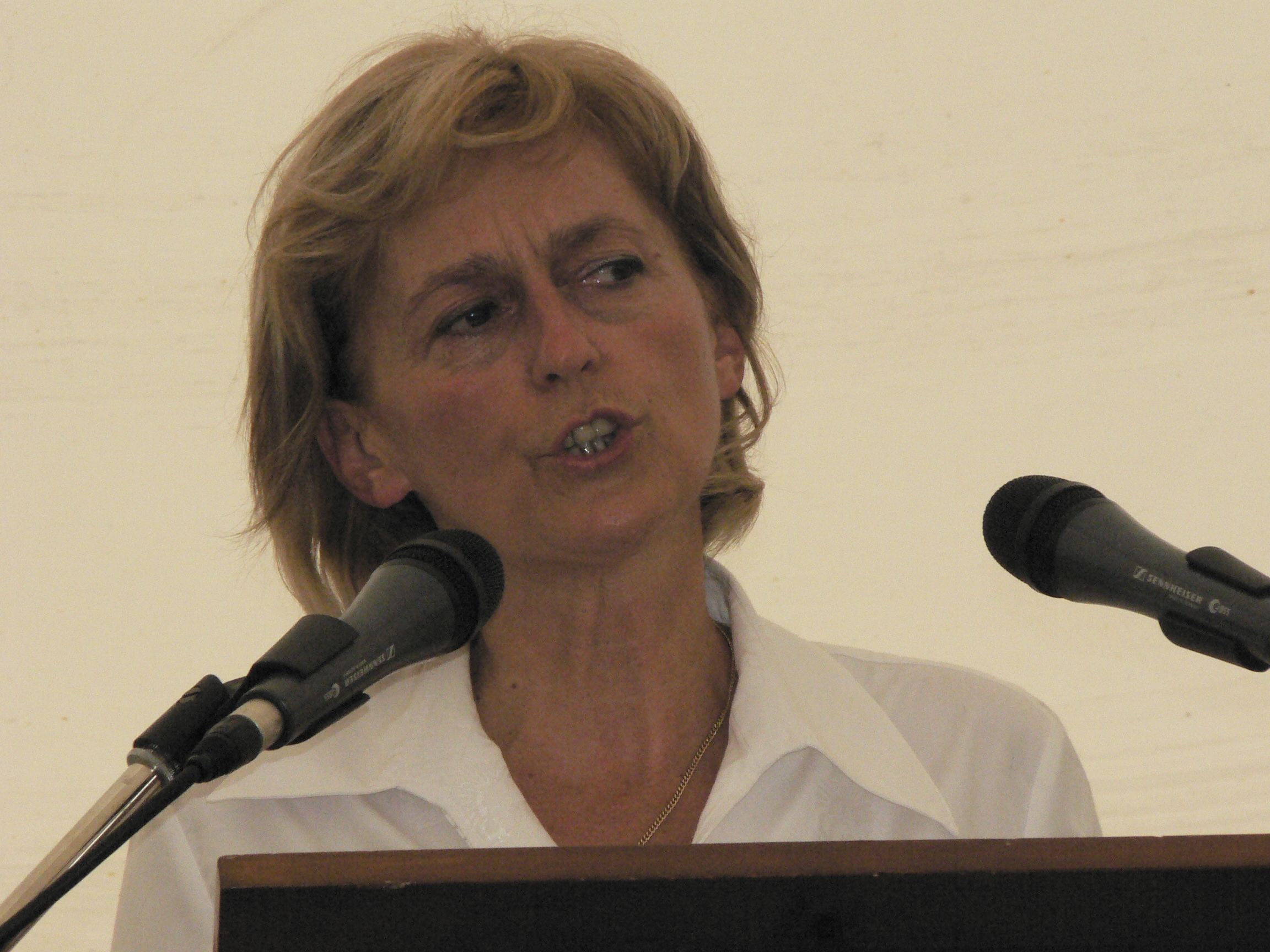
Ibolya Dávid, party leader 1999–2010

The MDF was admitted to the European People's Party (EPP) as an observer in 1998, becoming an associate member in 2001 and a full member in 2004. From 1999 to 2010, the party was led by Ibolya Dávid.

The MDF had 24 seats in the National Assembly between 2002 and 2006, due to an electoral alliance with Fidesz.

In the 2004 European Parliamentary Elections it gained 5.3% (164,025 votes) of the vote and one of its members, Péter Olajos, was elected as a Member of the European Parliament (MEP), sitting with the EPP-ED Group.

The party received 5.04% (272,831 votes) of the votes in the 2006 parliamentary elections, thus securing its place in the next Parliament.

=== Decline (2006–2010) ===
MDF had essentially split, with the majority of its parliamentary representatives ousted from the party. Ibolya Dávid regularly accused Fidesz, the largest conservative force in Hungary of trying to annex her party. The two parties had a bitter quarrel following the first round of the 2006 parliamentary elections on the possible withdrawal of MDF candidates to support the Fidesz: the presidency of the party decided not to do this. However, a number of MDF candidates decided to withdraw at their own discretion.

In 2008, the presidential election turned into a scandal, where Ibolya Dávid said that people associated with UD Ltd. had attempted to interfere with internal affairs of her party, and released secretly recorded telephone conversations as evidence. Dávid and his supporters forced MDF politician Kornél Almássy to withdraw from running for party chairman at a party congress to re-elect officials.

MDF was a member of the EPP, but on 22 June 2009 its newly elected MEP Lajos Bokros joined the European Conservatives and Reformists (ECR) group in the European Parliament instead of the EPP Group. This led to the party's suspension from the EPP. Instead, it joined the Alliance of European Conservatives and Reformists (AECR), that was founded in October 2009. On 8 October 2009, Ibolya Dávid was a guest speaker at the annual conference of the British Conservative Party, to confirm a long-term strategic alliance between the two parties in Europe.

Bokros' nomination indicated a change of political position from conservative to liberal ideology. As a result, several prominent members left the party, including Péter Olajos, Kálmán Katona and former Prime Minister Péter Boross. With MP András Csáky's quit, the Hungarian Democratic Forum's parliamentary group defunct according to the house rules in March 2009.

In 2010, Lajos Bokros became the party's candidate for the position of prime minister in the 2010 parliamentary election, and several other former left-wing politicians were placed on the national list, for instance writer József Debreczeni and Zoltán Somogyi, a political analyst of the Political Capital. Furthermore, MDF entered into an electoral alliance with SzDSz, which suffered a crushing defeat during the 2009 European Parliament election. Its chairman Attila Retkes received a place on the national list and there were also joint candidates in some constituencies. After the decision, the quits became a mass phenomenon, whole local party organizations ceased to exist. On the national election, MDF came to the fifth place and received only 2.67% of the votes, thus shut out of the legislature altogether for the first time since the transition to democracy, after twenty years. Ibolya Dávid immediately resigned from her position and retired from the politics.

== Dissolution ==
Upon the resignation of Dávid, her deputy Károly Herényi was elected interim president of the now extra-parliamentary party. In June 2010, Zsolt Makay became the new president. The newly elected leadership decided to transform the party and adopted a new name, Welfare and Freedom (JESZ) on 12 December 2010. The party's congress approved the change of name in March 2011, as a result Democratic Community of Welfare and Freedom (JESZ) was formed officially on 8 April 2011.

The leadership of the JESZ called Bokros several times to give back his MEP mandate, but all relationship has been lost between Bokros and his former party.

== Election results ==
=== National Assembly ===
Election	Votes			Seats		Rank	Government	Prime Minister candidate
Election	#	%	±pp	#	+/−	Rank	Government	Prime Minister candidate
1990	1,213,825	24.72%	–	164 / 386	±0	1st	MDF–FKgP–KDNP	József Antall
1994	649,966	12.03%	▼12.87	38 / 386	▼127	3rd	in opposition	Péter Boross
1998	139,934	3.12%^{1}	▼8.91	17 / 386	▼21	7th	Fidesz-FKgP-MDF	Sándor Lezsák
2002^{2}	2,306,763	41.07%	▲36.95	24 / 386	▲7	2nd	in opposition	Viktor Orbán (Fidesz)
2006	272,831	5.04%	–	11 / 386	▼13	4th	in opposition	Ibolya Dávid
2010	136,895	2.67%	▼3.37	0 / 386	▼11	5th	No seats	Lajos Bokros

^{1}MDF has not reached the 5% election threshold, but 17 joint Fidesz–MDF individual candidates won their constituencies and formed a separate parliamentary group.

^{2}Joint list with Fidesz – Hungarian Civic Alliance.

=== European Parliament ===
Election year	# of overall votes	% of overall vote	# of overall seats won	+/-	Notes
2004	164,025	5.34% (4th)	1 / 24		
2009	153,660	5.31% (4th)	1 / 22	0	

== Party leaders ==
	Image	Name	Entered office	Left office	Length of Leadership
1		Zoltán Bíró	27 September 1987	21 October 1989	2 years, 24 days
2		József Antall	21 October 1989	12 December 1993 †	4 years, 1 month, 21 days
3		Lajos Für	19 February 1994	2 March 1996	2 years, 12 days
4		Sándor Lezsák	2 March 1996	30 January 1999	2 years, 10 months, 28 days
5		Ibolya Dávid	30 January 1999	11 April 2010	11 years, 2 months, 12 days
–		Károly Herényi (acting)	11 April 2010	20 June 2010	2 months, 9 days
6		Zsolt Makay	20 June 2010	8 April 2011	9 months, 19 days
