= 2004 European Parliament election in Hungary =

- 13 June 2004

All 24 Hungarian seats to the European Parliament 13 seats needed for a majority
- Turnout: 38.48%
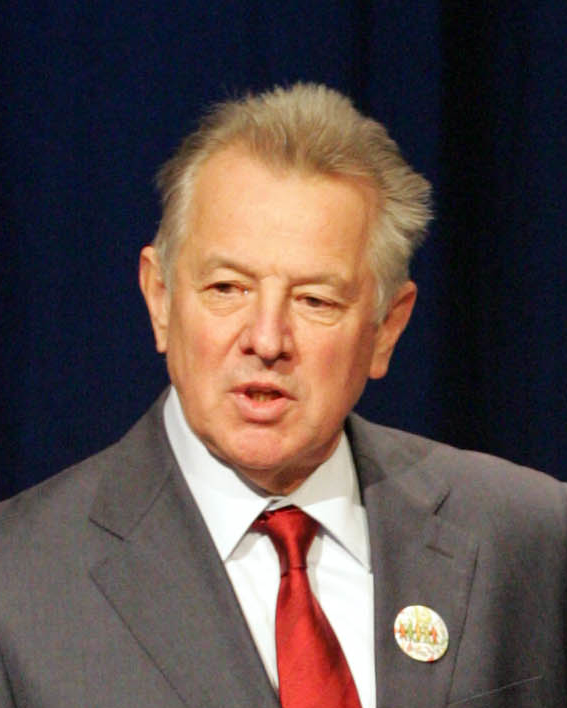

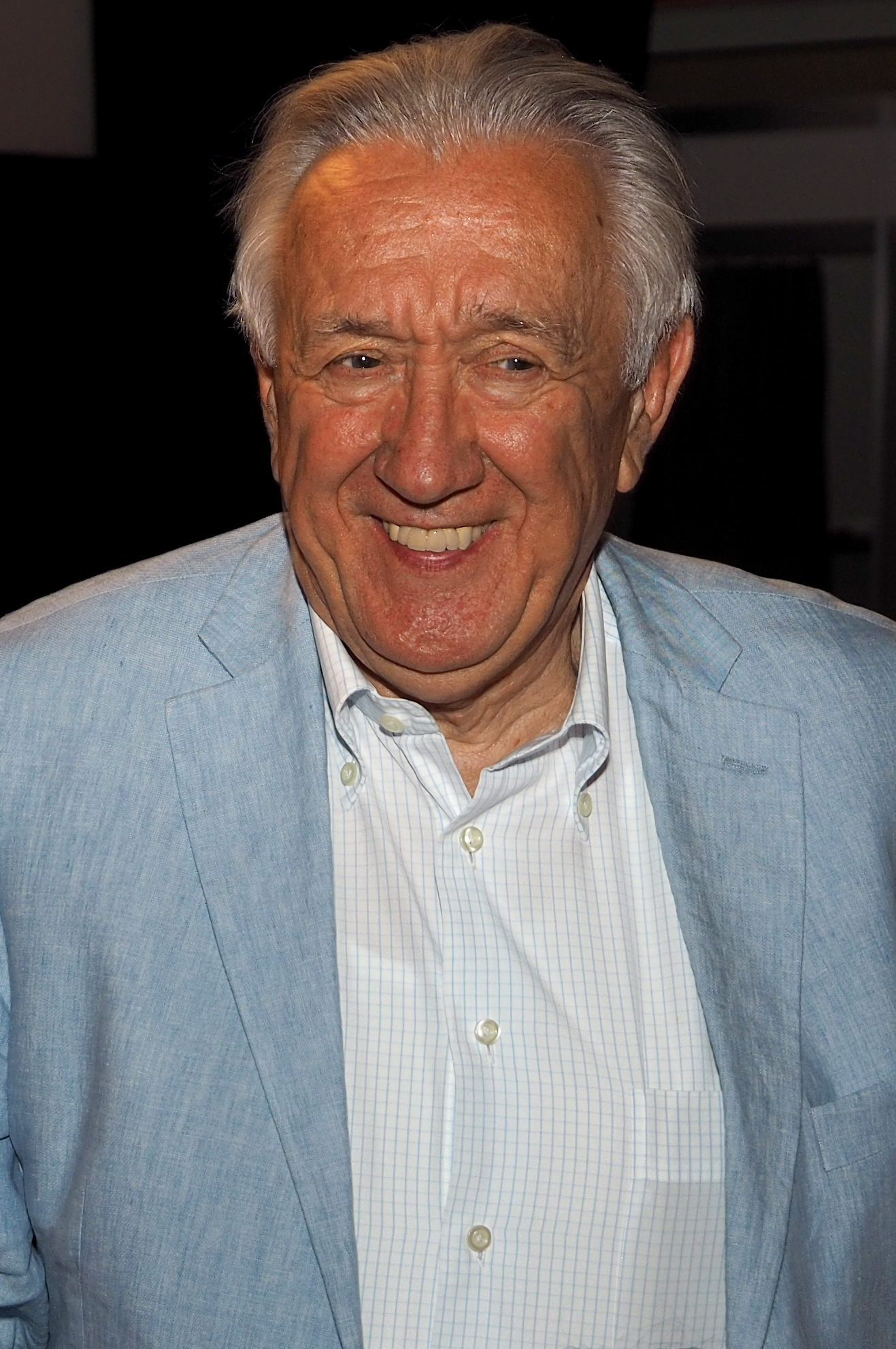

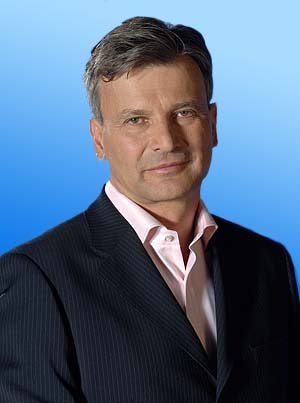

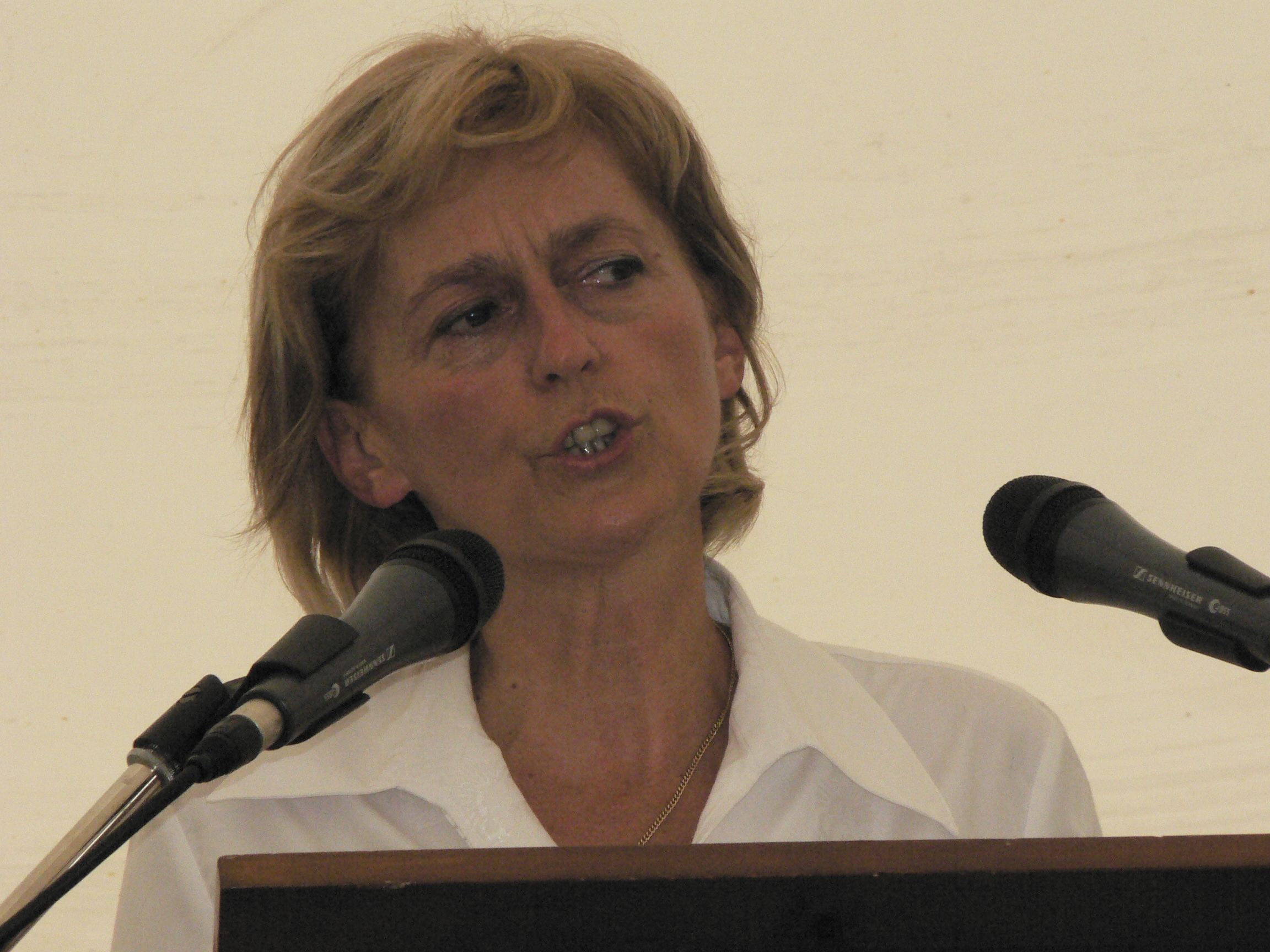
	First party	Second party
Leader	Pál Schmitt	László Kovács
Party	Fidesz	MSZP
Alliance	EPP	S&D
Seats won	12	9
Popular vote	1,457,750	1,054,921
Percentage	47.40%	34.30%
	Third party	Fourth party
Leader	Gábor Demszky	Ibolya Dávid
Party	SZDSZ	MDF
Alliance	ALDE Group	EPP
Seats won	2	1
Popular vote	237,908	164,025
Percentage	7.74%	5.33%

The 2004 European Parliament elections in Hungary were held on 13 June 2004 as part of the wider 2004 European Parliament election. This was the first European election to be held since Hungary's accession into the EU and thus the first elections in Hungary.

The ruling Hungarian Socialist Party was heavily defeated by the opposition conservative Fidesz − Hungarian Civic Union and other conservative parties.

== Results ==
Party	Votes	%	Seats
Fidesz	1,457,750	47.40	12
Hungarian Socialist Party	1,054,921	34.30	9
Alliance of Free Democrats	237,908	7.74	2
Hungarian Democratic Forum	164,025	5.33	1
Hungarian Justice and Life Party	72,203	2.35	0
Hungarian Workers' Party	56,221	1.83	0
Hungarian National Alliance	20,226	0.66	0
Social Democratic Party	12,196	0.40	0
Total	3,075,450	100.00	24
Valid votes	3,075,450	99.33	
Invalid/blank votes	20,729	0.67	
Total votes	3,096,179	100.00	
Registered voters/turnout	8,046,247	38.48	

=== By county ===
County	Fidesz	MSZP	SZDSZ	MDF	MIÉP	Munkáspárt	MNSZ	SZDP
Bács-Kiskun	56.38	27.39	6.22	5.52	1.86	1.66	0.59	0.38
Baranya	45.18	37.98	7.03	5.51	1.53	1.92	0.47	0.39
Békés	48.87	34.55	5.48	5.40	1.84	2.72	0.66	0.49
Borsod-Abaúj-Zemplén	43.04	41.06	5.68	4.46	2.33	2.37	0.60	0.46
Budapest	39.29	36.19	12.85	5.55	3.13	1.71	0.89	0.39
Csongrád	49.12	33.66	6.79	5.28	1.93	2.20	0.63	0.38
Fejér	49.68	33.61	7.12	4.85	2.06	1.73	0.53	0.43
Győr-Moson-Sopron	55.22	29.37	5.56	6.06	1.66	1.27	0.51	0.36
Hajdú-Bihar	53.81	31.36	5.34	4.75	2.22	1.57	0.56	0.39
Heves	42.61	39.36	6.63	5.05	2.90	2.42	0.56	0.47
Jász-Nagykun-Szolnok	44.64	38.36	5.86	4.89	2.04	3.12	0.60	0.49
Komárom-Esztergom	43.05	40.53	7.43	4.51	1.83	1.69	0.56	0.39
Nógrád	46.38	36.04	4.89	5.30	2.01	4.43	0.50	0.44
Pest	49.01	31.46	8.29	5.59	3.12	1.40	0.77	0.37
Somogy	52.25	34.19	5.17	4.20	1.80	1.56	0.48	0.33
Szabolcs-Szatmár-Bereg	49.59	36.86	4.65	4.22	1.92	1.55	0.82	0.38
Tolna	52.18	31.49	5.45	6.37	1.92	1.68	0.54	0.36
Vas	56.73	27.27	6.34	6.03	1.59	1.15	0.48	0.42
Veszprém	52.98	30.65	6.39	5.81	1.77	1.60	0.45	0.35
Zala	54.56	29.83	5.76	5.54	2.12	1.31	0.51	0.36
Foreign representations	44.63	27.58	18.94	6.76	1.39	0.20	0.15	0.35
Total	47.40	34.30	7.74	5.33	2.35	1.83	0.66	0.40

== See also ==
- 2003 Hungarian European Union membership referendum
