= Ibolya Dávid =

Hungarian lawyer and politician

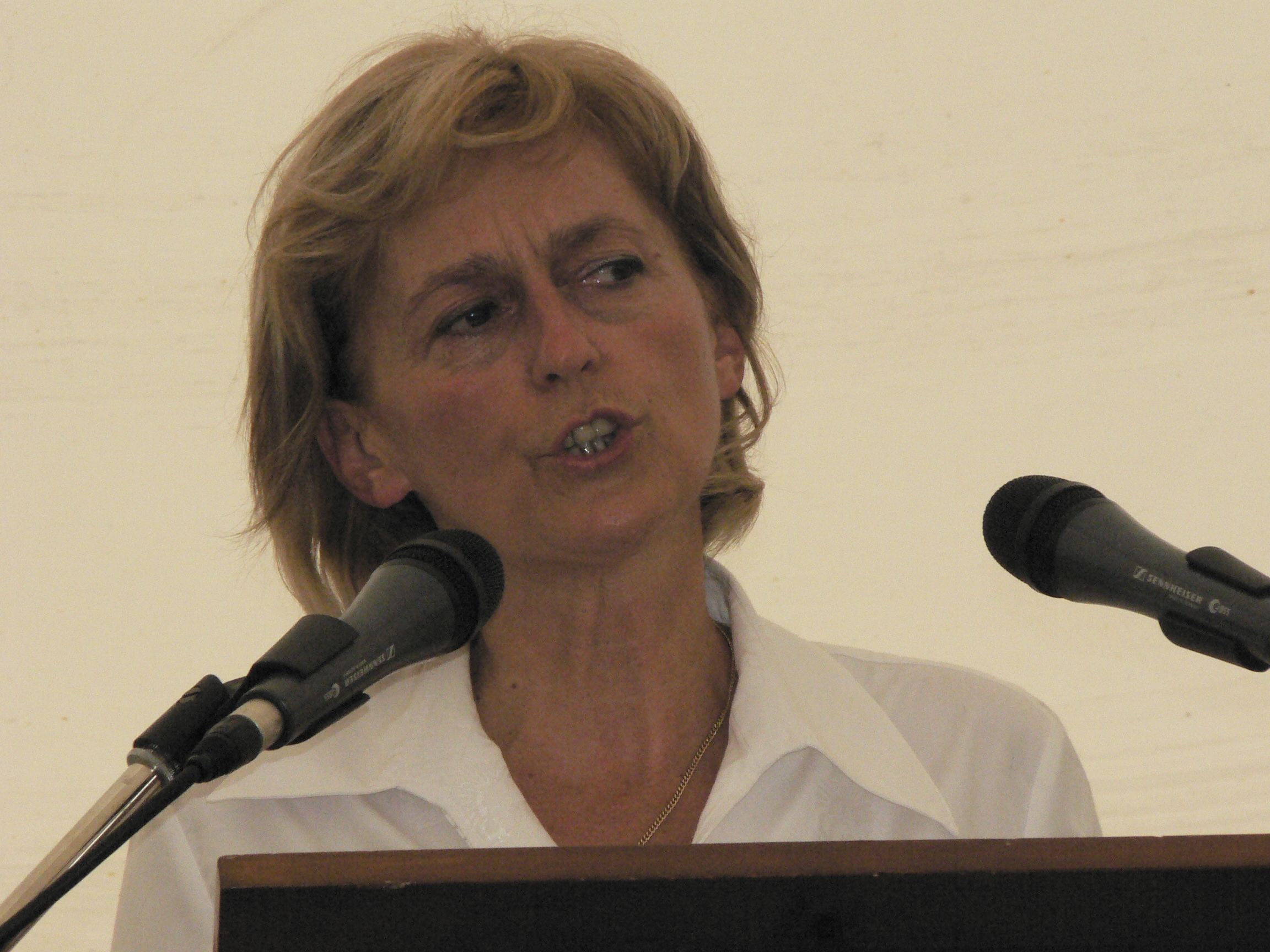
- Ibolya in 2006

Minister of Justice
- In office 8 July 1998 – 27 May 2002
- Prime Minister: Viktor Orbán
- Preceded by: Pál Vastagh
- Succeeded by: Péter Bárándy

Personal details
- Born: 12 August 1954 (age 71) Baja, People's Republic of Hungary
- Party: MDF
- Children: 2
- Profession: Politician, jurist

Ibolya Dávid (born 1954 in Baja, Hungary) is a Hungarian lawyer, politician, she was the president of the Hungarian Democratic Forum (MDF) between 1999 and 2010. Dávid was the Hungarian Minister of Justice between 1998 and 2002.

In 1998 as the minister of justice of Hungary she didn't sign off on the presidential pardon of Peter Kunos bank CEO, even though the approval for presidential pardons was previously thought to be customary, and always done by the current minister of justice. Due to the lack of approval the pardon didn't come into effect. This happened the first time in the history of the democratic Hungary.

She was the only female Minister in the government of Viktor Orbán. After the MDF fraction was disbanded, Dávid was a member of the Hungarian Parliament as an independent. Dávid made the controversial decision to nominate Lajos Bokros, a former minister in Gyula Horn's MSZP government, to the European Parliament election on the MDF party list which led to some members leaving the party.

In the 2010 parliamentary election the Hungarian Democratic Forum continued its downward trend and missed the 5% electoral threshold, leaving it shut out of parliament. Ibolya Dávid resigned on 11 April 2010, after the first round. Károly Herényi became her acting successor.

Political offices
Preceded by Pál Vastagh	Minister of Justice; 1998–2002	Succeeded by Péter Bárándy
Party political offices
Preceded by Sándor Lezsák	President of the Hungarian Democratic Forum; 1999–2010	Succeeded by Károly Herényi
