= 2010 Hungarian parliamentary election =

- 11 April 2010 (first round); 25 April 2010 (second round)

All 386 seats in the National Assembly 194 seats needed for a majority
- Turnout: 64.38% (first round); 46.66% (second round)
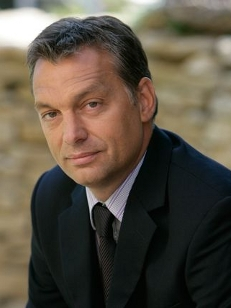

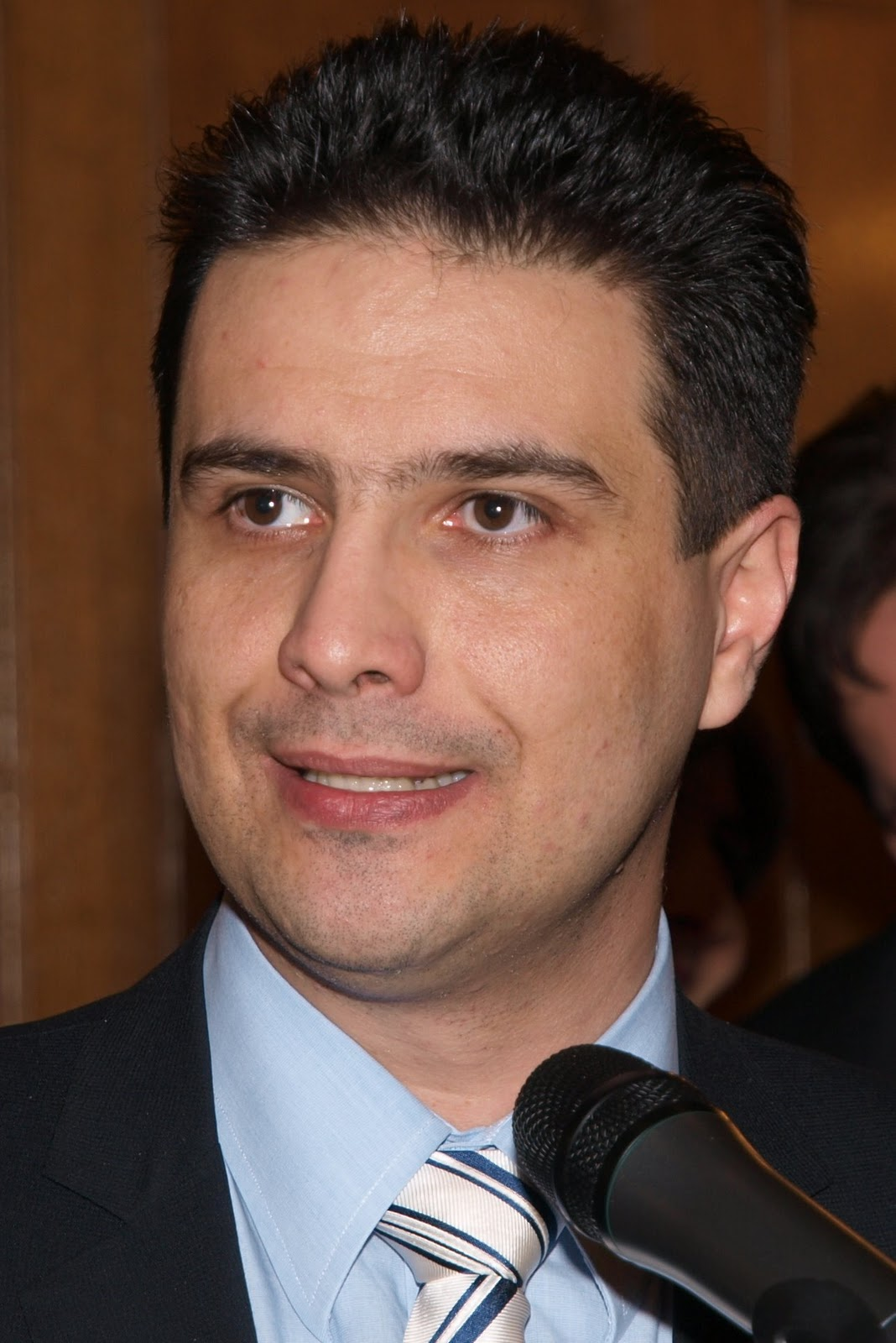

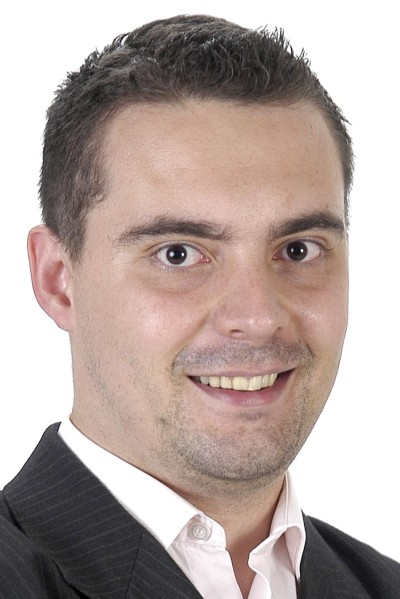

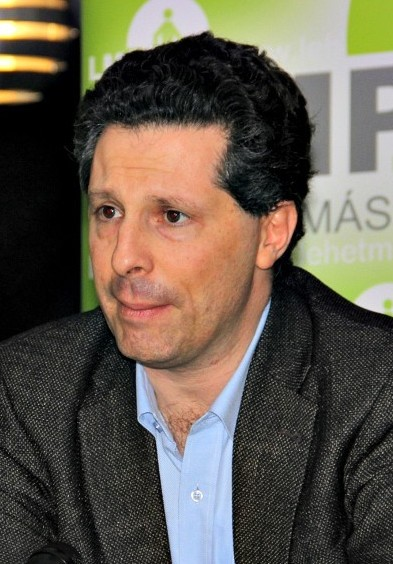
	First party	Second party
Leader	Viktor Orbán	Attila Mesterházy
Party	Fidesz	MSZP
Alliance	Fidesz–KDNP
Leader since	17 May 2003 (Note: As Fidesz leader.)	12 December 2009 (Note: Mesterházy was selected as the MSZP's Prime Minister candidate on 12 December 2009, but was not leader of the party until 10 July 2010.)
Last election	164 seats, 42.03%	190 seats, 43.21%
Seats won	263	59
Seat change	▲99	▼131
1R vote and %	2,732,965 (53.4%)	1,088,374 (21.3%)
2R vote and %	620,232 (53.8%)	326,361 (28.3%)
Party vote	2,706,292	990,428
% and swing	52.73% ▲10.70 pp	19.30% ▼23.91 pp
	Third party	Fourth party
Leader	Gábor Vona	András Schiffer
Party	Jobbik	LMP
Leader since	25 November 2006	(Note: Schiffer was the lead candidate for LMP, but the party was led by a collective board until 24 March 2013.)
Last election	0 seats, 2.20% (Note: As part of MIÉP–Jobbik a Harmadik Út.)	Did not exist
Seats won	47	16
Seat change	▲47	New party
1R vote and %	836,774 (16.4%)	259,220 (5.1%)
2R vote and %	141,415 (12.3%)	43,437 (3.8%)
Party vote	855,436	383,876
% and swing	16.67% ▲14.47 pp	7.48% New
- Results of the election. A darker shade indicates a higher vote share. Proportional list results are displayed in the top left.
Government before election
Bajnai Government
MSZP
Government after election
Second Orbán Government
Fidesz–KDNP

Parliamentary elections were held in Hungary on 11 and 25 April 2010 to elect the members of the National Assembly. They were the sixth free elections since the end of the communist era. 386 Members of Parliament (MPs) were elected in a combined system of party lists and electoral constituencies. Electoral law in Hungary requires candidates to gather 500 signatures from citizens supporting their candidacy.

In the first round of the elections, the conservative party Fidesz won an absolute majority of seats, enough to form a government on its own. In the second round, the alliance of Fidesz and the Christian Democratic People's Party (KDNP) won enough additional seats to achieve a two-thirds majority required to modify major laws and the country's constitution. They were the last elections in this country before the electoral system was completely changed, beginning 16 years of Fidesz government.

After their first victory in 2010, the Fidesz government led by Viktor Orbán created a dominant party and economic system called System of National Cooperation, and Hungary was gradually reclassified by Freedom House from a democracy to a transitional or hybrid regime.

== Background ==
Fidesz's landslide victory was a result of massive dissatisfaction with the Hungarian Socialist Party (MSZP), which had been in government since 2002, exacerbated by the 2008 financial crisis. One event that provoked an especially strong backlash was the revelation that the MSZP's Ferenc Gyurcsány, Prime Minister from 2004 to 2009, had admitted in a private speech to party members that he had lied to the general public during the previous election campaign to help his party win re-election. The Őszöd speech, as it came to be called, surfaced in the press during the autumn of 2006 and resulted in nationwide protests.

== Electoral system ==
Of the 386 seats in the National Assembly, 176 were elected from single member constituencies, 146 from multi-member constituencies and a further 64 from "compensatory" national seats.

== Opinion polls ==
The Hungarian Democratic Forum (MDF) and Alliance of Free Democrats (SZDSZ) entered a limited electoral cooperation agreement after polls suggested that they would be unlikely to make it into parliament independently. In March 2010, polls also indicated that parliament after the election would likely be dominated by Fidesz, polling at 53–67% that month, followed by either the ruling Hungarian Socialist Party at 12–22% or newcomer Jobbik (Movement for a Better Hungary) at 11–18%.

View source data.

Election Party preferences in percentage (What percentage of eligible voters would have voted for the party)
Agency	Date	Fidesz–KDNP	MSZP	Jobbik	MDF	LMP	SZDSZ	KDNP	Other
Medián	25 November 2009	66	19	10	2	1	1	n/a	1
Tárki	25 November 2009	68	17	11	1	1	1	2	n/a
Századvég-Forsense	26 November 2009	59	20	12	3	3	1	n/a	3
Tárki	16 December 2009	63	19	12	1	3	1	n/a	n/a
Századvég-Forsense	21 December 2009	64	17	9	3	2	0	n/a	4
Medián	25 December 2009	61	23	9	2	1	1	n/a	3
Szonda Ipsos	17 January 2010	63	21	12	2	n/a	1	0	1
Forsense	21 January 2010	59	17	15	5	3	n/a	n/a	n/a
Medián	21 January 2010	65	19	10	3	1	0	n/a	2
Századvég-Kód	26 January 2010	59	23	10	4	2	1	1	n/a
Tárki	27 January 2010	62	22	11	3	1	1	n/a	n/a
Szonda Ipsos	12 February 2010	58	22	14	2	1	1	0	3
Századvég-Kód	18 February 2010	58	23	10	5	3	1	-	-
Forsense	22 February 2010	59	18	14	2	5	0	n/a	1
Medián	24 February 2010	63	18	15	2	1	n/a	n/a	1
Tárki	3 March 2010	61	22	11	2	3	n/a	n/a	1
Szonda Ipsos	11 March 2010	57	20	17	1	3	1	0	1
Nézőpont Intézet	14 March 2010	53	12	12	2	2	n/a	n/a	0
Medián	17 March 2010	57	21	18	1	2	n/a	n/a	1
Szonda Ipsos	18 March 2010	64	12	13	3	5	n/a	n/a	3
Gallup	25 March 2010	67	15	14	1	4	n/a	n/a	0
Századvég-Kód	29 March 2010	59	16	17	3	3	n/a	n/a	n/a

== Controversies ==
The European Parliament elections of 2009 in Hungary saw the rise of right-wing and far-right parties. This trend was covered negatively by some foreign media outlets that feared the rise of intolerance and xenophobia in the country. In addition, Fidesz Member of Parliament Oszkár Molnár was accused of antisemitism after saying "I love Hungary, I love Hungarians, and I prefer Hungarian interests to global financial capital, or Jewish capital, if you like, which wants to devour the whole world, but especially Hungary." He later said that it was only a response to a speech by President of Israel Shimon Peres when he spoke of Israel's investments abroad, saying that "Israeli businessmen are investing all around the world, enjoying unparalleled success, earning economic independence. We're buying up Manhattan, Poland, Hungary and Romania." Jobbik leader Gábor Vona, also stirred up controversy with allegations of chauvinism by saying "Hungary is for Hungarians" and must be defended against "foreign speculators". Molnár also claimed that the language of instruction in Jerusalem schools was Hungarian and they were "learning the language of their future homeland". His party at the time, Fidesz, did not denounce his statement but simply said it was "embarrassing". Adding that he would not even consider ousting Molnar from his party or parliamentary faction, as the remark "did not violate the party's bylaws". Molnár also claimed that pregnant Roma women deliberately try to induce birth defects so they can give birth to "fools to receive higher family subsidies. I have checked this and it’s true; they hit their bellies with a rubber hammer so that they’ll give birth to handicapped kids." In 2011, he denounced Roma women at the Hungarian police authorities.

=== Foreign interference ===
Former Jobbik MEP Krisztina Morvai wrote an open letter to Eleni Tsakopoulos Kounalakis, the United States Ambassador to Hungary, alleging foreign interference after the ambassador visited the headquarters of three major parties but not that of Jobbik.

== Results ==
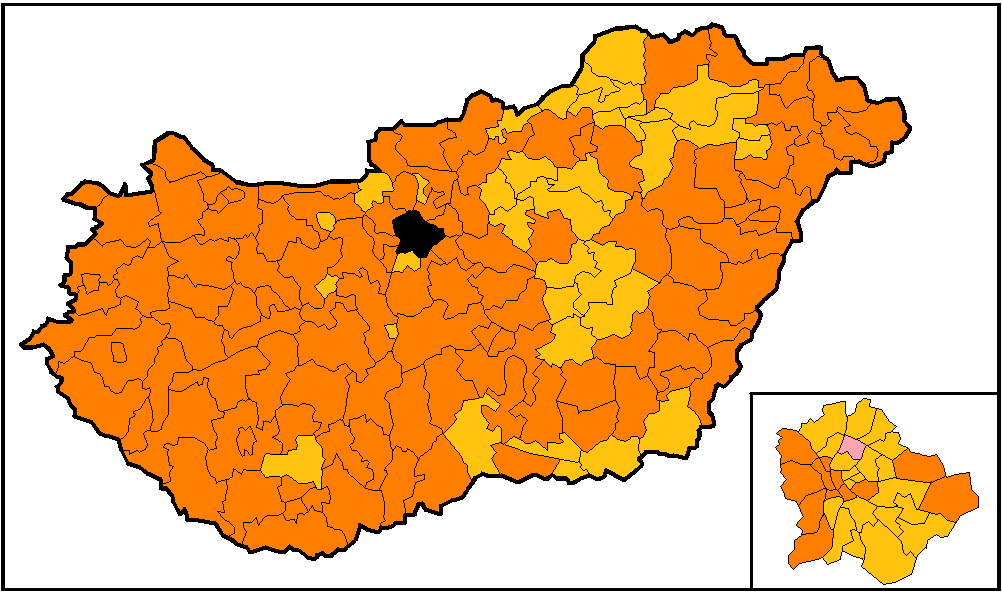
2010 Hungarian parliamentary election, first round: First-placed candidates by parties in the single-seat constituencies: ██ = majority won by Fidesz–KDNP (119) ██ = plurality, Fidesz–KDNP (56) ██ = plurality, MSZP (1)

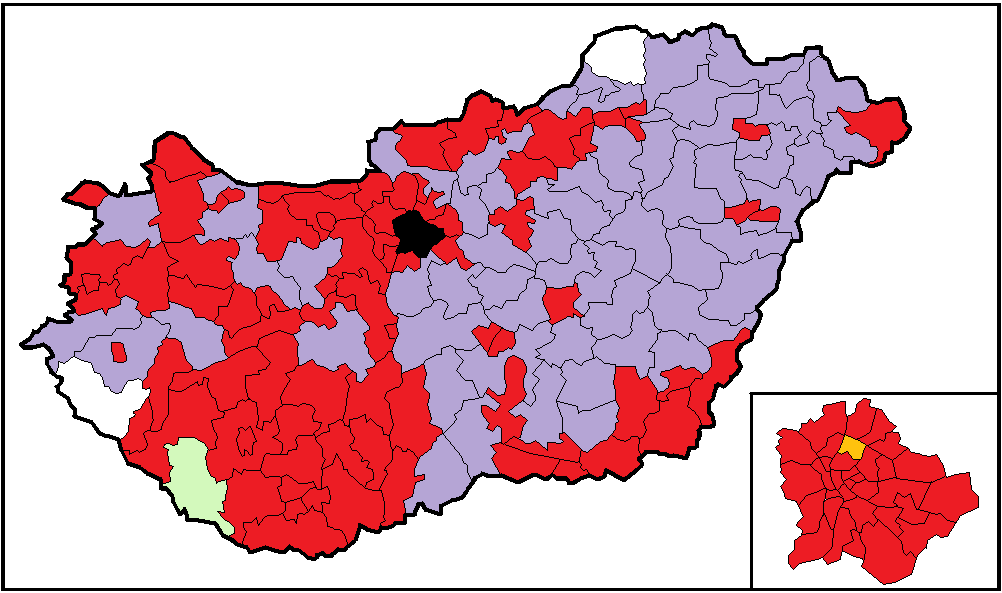
2010 Hungarian parliamentary election, first round: second-place candidates by parties in the single-seat constituencies ██ = MSZP (112) ██ = Jobbik (60) ██ = Somogyért Szövetség (1) ██ = Fidesz-KDNP (1) ██ = independent candidate (2)

Party	Proportional			SMCs (first round)			SMCs (second round)			Seats		
Party	Votes	%	Seats	Votes	%	Seats	Votes	%	Seats	National	Total	+/–
Fidesz–KDNP	2,706,292	52.73	87	2,732,965	53.43	119	620,232	53.81	53	3	262	+99
Hungarian Socialist Party	990,428	19.30	28	1,088,374	21.28	0	326,361	28.31	2	29	59	–131
Jobbik	855,436	16.67	26	836,774	16.36	0	141,415	12.27	0	21	47	+47
Politics Can Be Different	383,876	7.48	5	259,220	5.07	0	43,437	3.77	0	11	16	+16
Hungarian Democratic Forum	136,895	2.67	0	72,768	1.42	0				0	0	–11
Civil Movement	45,863	0.89	0	34,938	0.68	0				0	0	New
Hungarian Workers' Party	5,606	0.11	0	5,668	0.11	0				0	0	0
Social Democratic Party of Hungary	4,117	0.08	0	3,156	0.06	0				0	0	New
Unity Party	2,732	0.05	0	3,422	0.07	0				0	0	New
Hungarian Justice and Life Party	1,286	0.03	0	2,345	0.05	0				0	0	0
Hungarian Democratic Forum–Alliance of Free Democrats				12,652	0.25	0				0	0	–
Fidesz–KDNP–Entrepreneurs' Party				10,661	0.21	0	8,796	0.76	1	0	1	–
Association for Somogy				7,470	0.15	0				0	0	–1
Hungarian Democratic Forum–Összefogás Megyénkért				4,052	0.08	0				0	0	–
Torgyán-Kisgazda-Koalíció				3,079	0.06	0				0	0	New
Green Left				1,425	0.03	0				0	0	New
Magyarok Egymásért Szövetsége				1,027	0.02	0				0	0	New
Forum of Hungarian Gypsy Organizations Roma Co-operation Party				491	0.01	0				0	0	0
Independent Smallholders Party				381	0.01	0				0	0	0
Independents				33,702	0.66	0	12,452	1.08	1	–	1	+1
Total	5,132,531	100.00	146	5,114,570	100.00	119	1,152,693	100.00	57	64	386	0
Valid votes	5,132,531	99.27		5,114,570	98.93		1,152,693	99.39				
Invalid/blank votes	37,908	0.73		55,428	1.07		7,118	0.61				
Total votes	5,170,439	100.00		5,169,998	100.00		1,159,811	100.00				
Registered voters/turnout	8,034,394	64.35		8,034,394	64.35		2,486,111	46.65				
Source: National Election Office, Election Resources

=== Party list results by county ===
Results by county: Fidesz: 40–50% 50–60% 60–70%

County	Fidesz–KDNP	MSZP	Jobbik	LMP	MDF	Others
Bács-Kiskun	60.45	14.62	15.70	5.58	2.23	1.43
Baranya	54.53	21.07	12.68	8.90	2.83	–
Békés	53.20	18.45	19.21	5.21	2.05	1.89
Borsod-Abaúj-Zemplén	45.87	18.90	27.20	4.20	1.84	1.98
Budapest	46.32	25.33	10.84	12.81	4.70	–
Csongrád	50.72	20.38	15.93	7.66	2.57	2.75
Fejér	54.16	17.91	16.20	6.96	2.69	2.07
Győr-Moson-Sopron	59.68	16.87	12.57	6.32	2.95	1.60
Hajdú-Bihar	57.92	14.04	18.86	5.05	2.34	1.78
Heves	45.78	21.02	24.97	6.04	2.19	–
Jász-Nagykun-Szolnok	49.42	17.88	24.01	5.65	2.13	0.91
Komárom-Esztergom	51.31	23.39	13.76	8.37	3.17	–
Nógrád	51.84	20.39	20.82	5.57	–	1.37
Pest	52.90	17.58	16.52	8.35	2.75	1.89
Somogy	59.63	19.74	14.23	6.39	–	–
Szabolcs-Szatmár-Bereg	53.84	14.84	23.64	2.86	1.81	3.01
Tolna	58.68	17.88	15.44	5.45	2.54	–
Vas	62.77	16.96	12.09	6.37	–	1.81
Veszprém	56.79	18.81	14.66	7.15	2.59	–
Zala	57.21	16.85	16.91	5.80	2.65	0.58
Total	52.73	19.30	16.67	7.48	2.67	1.16

=== Turnout ===
All times are CEST.

Round 1
7:00	9:00	11:00	13:00	15:00	17:30	Overall
1.61%	10.23%	24.78%	35.88%	46.78%	59.28%	64.36%

Round 2
7:00	9:00	11:00	13:00	15:00	17:30	Overall
1.36%	8.50%	19.37%	27.11%	33.54%	41.89%	46.52%

== Post-election controversies ==
Four Jobbik MPs—Gábor Staudt, Gergő Balla, Zsolt Endrésik and Péter Schön—were removed from their committees because they had failed a vetting procedure that asked whether any MP's maintain contact with groups that engage in "activities that deny the basic principles of a state governed by the rule of law." Staudt, a co-founder of the Magyar Gárda Society—that was banned in 2007—had been on the national security committee, while the other three were on the defence and law enforcement committees. Staudt reacted in saying he found the result to be unconstitutional, and that he would file a criminal report with the interior minister against Defence of the Constitution Office director general László Balajti. The four would, however, continue to be MPs.
