= 2021 Hungarian opposition primary results by constituency =

The results of the 2021 Hungarian opposition primary by constituency

The following list contains results of the 2021 Hungarian opposition primary by constituency. The winners became joint candidates of the electoral alliance United for Hungary to compete against candidates of the ruling party Fidesz in the 2022 Hungarian parliamentary election.

== Budapest ==
=== District 1 ===
Primary – Budapest 1
Party	Candidate	Votes	%
LMP	Antal Csárdi	5,437	60%
Momentum	Ferenc Gelencsér	3,625	40%
Total votes		9,062	100%

=== District 2 ===
Primary – Budapest 2
Party	Candidate	Votes	%
Momentum	Anna Orosz	8,445	68.96%
DK	Erzsébet Gy. Németh	3,801	31.04%
Total votes		12,246	100%

=== District 3 ===
Primary – Budapest 3
Party	Candidate	Votes	%
Momentum	Miklós Hajnal	5,381	45.98%
DK	Zoltán Komáromi	4,803	41.04%
ÚVNP	Piroska Visi (Note: Beside ÚVNP, also accepted into parliamentary group by LMP)	1,520	12.99%
Total votes		11,704	100%

=== District 4 ===
Primary – Budapest 4
Party	Candidate	Votes	%
PM	Bence Tordai	6,968	67.05%
DK	Olga Kálmán	3,425	32.95%
Total votes		10,393	100%

=== District 5 ===
Primary – Budapest 5
Party	Candidate	Votes	%
DK	Lajos Oláh	4,221	45.51%
Momentum	Márton Tompos	3,519	37.94%
Jobbik	Zsuzsanna Beleznay	1,534	16.54%
Total votes		11,704	100%

=== District 6 ===
Primary – Budapest 6
Party	Candidate	Votes	%
PM	András Jámbor (Note: Supported by Spark, accepted into parliamentary group by PM)	3,626	41.58%
Momentum	Anett Csordás	2,224	25.50%
DK	Dániel Manhalter	2,056	23.58%
Jobbik	Márta Demeter	815	9.35%
Total votes		8,721	100%

=== District 7 ===
Primary – Budapest 7
Party	Candidate	Votes	%
MSZP	Dezső Hiszékeny	7,798	55.47%
Momentum	Zsófia Naszádos	3,197	22.74%
DK	Dorottya Keszthelyi	3,064	21.79%
Total votes		14,059	100%

=== District 8 ===
Primary – Budapest 8
Party	Candidate	Votes	%
Momentum	Ákos Hadházy	11,070	80.72%
MSZP	Csaba Tóth (Note: Withdrew his candidacy on 27 September 2021, one day before the end of the first round)	2,644	19.28%
Total votes		13,714	100%

=== District 9 ===
Primary – Budapest 9
Party	Candidate	Votes	%
DK	Gergely Arató	3,571	43.56%
PM	Sándor Burány	2,886	35.20%
Momentum	Anikó Paróczai	1,741	21.24%
Total votes		8,198	100%

=== District 10 ===
Primary – Budapest 10
Party	Candidate	Votes	%
PM	Tímea Szabó	9,034	100%
Total votes		9,034	100%

=== District 11 ===
Primary – Budapest 11
Party	Candidate	Votes	%
DK	László Varju	9,854	100%
Total votes		9,854	100%

=== District 12 ===
Primary – Budapest 12
Party	Candidate	Votes	%
DK	Balázs Barkóczi	6,162	71.64%
Momentum	Béla Palocsai	2,439	28.36%
Total votes		8,601	100%

=== District 13 ===
Primary – Budapest 13
Party	Candidate	Votes	%
Independent	Zoltán Vajda (Note: Supported and accepted into parliamentary group by MSZP)	4,328	42.57%
DK	Gábor Nemes	2,663	26.20%
Momentum	Gábor Hollai	2,500	24.59%
ÚVNP	János Palotás	675	6.64%
Total votes		10,166	100%

=== District 14 ===
Primary – Budapest 14
Party	Candidate	Votes	%
Jobbik	György Szilágyi	5,492	61.99%
MSZP	Károly Lukoczki	3,367	38.01%
Total votes		8,859	100%

=== District 15 ===
Primary – Budapest 15
Party	Candidate	Votes	%
MSZP	Ágnes Kunhalmi	6,295	68.67%
DK	István Ferencz	2,872	31.33%
Total votes		9,167	100%

=== District 16 ===
Primary – Budapest 16
Party	Candidate	Votes	%
MSZP	István Hiller	6,935	84.42%
ÚVNP	László Vidákovics (Note: Beside ÚVNP, also accepted into parliamentary group by Momentum)	1,280	15.58%
Total votes		8,215	100%

=== District 17 ===
Primary – Budapest 17
Party	Candidate	Votes	%
Momentum	Szabolcs Szabó	5,550	65.06%
MSZP	Imre Komjáthi	2,981	34.94%
Total votes		8,531	100%

=== District 18 ===
Primary – Budapest 18
Party	Candidate	Votes	%
Momentum	Endre Tóth	5,694	50.19%
DK	Gyula Molnár	5,651	49.81%
Total votes		11,345	100%

== Bács-Kiskun County ==
=== District 1 ===
Primary – Bács-Kiskun 1
Party	Candidate	Votes	%
DK	Rita Szőkéné Kopping	1,669	51.69%
Jobbik	Zoltán Lejer	1,560	48.31%
Total votes		3,229	100%

=== District 2 ===
Primary – Bács-Kiskun 2
Party	Candidate	Votes	%
Momentum	Alexandra Bodrozsán	2,805	54.07%
MSZP	József Király	2,383	45.93%
Total votes		5,188	100%

=== District 3 ===
Primary – Bács-Kiskun 3
Party	Candidate	Votes	%
DK	Gyöngyi Magóné Tóth	2,717	57.92%
Jobbik	Nándor Kudron	1,599	34.09%
MSZP	Gabriella Angeli	375	7.99%
Total votes		4,691	100%

=== District 4 ===
Primary – Bács-Kiskun 4
Party	Candidate	Votes	%
LMP	Kálmán Kis-Szeniczey	2,425	100%
Total votes		2,425	100%

=== District 5 ===
Primary – Bács-Kiskun 5
Party	Candidate	Votes	%
DK	Roland Károly Horváth	1,868	55.89%
Momentum	Dénes Papp	784	23.46%
Independent	Erika Kovács (Note: Supported and accepted into parliamentary group by LMP)	690	20.65%
Total votes		3,342	100%

Winner candidate Roland Károly Horváth withdrew his candidacy on 14 January 2022, citing health reasons. He was replaced as candidate of the joint opposition by fellow Democratic Coalition member László Molnár.

=== District 6 ===
Primary – Bács-Kiskun 6
Party	Candidate	Votes	%
Momentum	László Kiss	1,325	34,48%
DK	Károly László	1,271	33,07%
Jobbik	Rozális Piringer	970	25,24%
ÚVNP	Antal Vass	277	7,21%
Total votes		3,843	100%

== Baranya County ==
=== District 1 ===
Primary – Baranya 1
Party	Candidate	Votes	%
PM	Tamás Mellár	4,563	54.78%
Momentum	Balázs Nemes	3,767	45.22%
Total votes		8,330	100%

=== District 2 ===
Primary – Baranya 2
Party	Candidate	Votes	%
DK	László Szakács	3,695	51.30%
LMP	László Lóránt Keresztes	3,508	48.70%
Total votes		7,203	100%

=== District 3 ===
Primary – Baranya 3
Party	Candidate	Votes	%
Jobbik	Patrik Schwarcz-Kiefer	2,000	59.59%
Momentum	Benjámin Frey	1,356	40.41%
Total votes		3,356	100%

=== District 4 ===
Primary – Baranya 2
Party	Candidate	Votes	%
DK	Lajosné Szarkándi	1,392	37.64%
MSZP	Péter Koltai	1,285	34.75%
Independent	György Alpár (Note: Supported by MMN, accepted into parliamentary group by Jobbik)	1,021	27.61%
Total votes		3,698	100%

== Békés County ==
=== District 1 ===
Primary – Békés 1
Party	Candidate	Votes	%
Jobbik	János Stummer	4,621	77.74%
MSZP	Attila Miklós	1,323	22.26%
Total votes		5,944	100%

=== District 2 ===
Primary – Békés 2
Party	Candidate	Votes	%
DK	Gábor Kondé	1,252	45.98%
Independent	Attila Gajdos	768	28.20%
MSZP	László Miskéri	703	25.82%
Total votes		2,723	100%

=== District 3 ===
Primary – Békés 3
Party	Candidate	Votes	%
DK	Gábor Leel-Őssy	2,348	58.02%
Momentum	Beáta Mikóné Hirth	1,699	41.98%
Total votes		4,047	100%

=== District 4 ===
Primary – Békés 4
Party	Candidate	Votes	%
Jobbik	Ervin Szabó	3,696	62.55%
MSZP	Zoltán Szelényi	2,213	37.45%
Total votes		5,909	100%

== Borsod-Abaúj-Zemplén County ==
=== District 1 ===
Primary – Borsod-Abaúj-Zemplén 1
Party	Candidate	Votes	%
Jobbik	Szabolcs Szilágyi	4,258	55,81%
MSZP	Gábor Simon	2,900	38,01%
Independent	Zsuzsanna Csabalik	472	6,19%
Total votes		7,630	100%

=== District 2 ===
Primary – Borsod-Abaúj-Zemplén 2
Party	Candidate	Votes	%
MSZP	László Varga	4,089	53,89%
DK	Andrea Hegedűs	3,498	46,11%
Total votes		7,587	100%

=== District 3 ===
Primary – Borsod-Abaúj-Zemplén 3
Party	Candidate	Votes	%
MSZP	Sándor Kiss	2,734	52,07%
Jobbik	Péter Barnabás Farkas	2,517	47,93%
Total votes		5,251	100%

=== District 4 ===
Primary – Borsod-Abaúj-Zemplén 4
Party	Candidate	Votes	%
Independent	Gábor Üveges	3,000	66.34%
Momentum	Evelin Hornyák	1,230	27.20%
Independent	István Koleszár	292	6.46%
Total votes		4,522	100%

=== District 5 ===
Primary – Borsod-Abaúj-Zemplén 5
Party	Candidate	Votes	%
Jobbik	Sándor Zsolt Erdei	2,265	70,94%
Momentum	Zsolt Berger	928	29,06%
Total votes		3,193	100%

=== District 6 ===
Primary – Borsod-Abaúj-Zemplén 6
Party	Candidate	Votes	%
MSZP	Gábor Jézsó	3,052	100%
Total votes		3,052	100%

=== District 7 ===
Primary – Borsod-Abaúj-Zemplén 7
Party	Candidate	Votes	%
DK	Ádám Sermer (Note: Member of the MLP, whose candidates ran under DK banner)	1,556	56.13%
MSZP	Anna Kormos	1,216	43.87%
Total votes		2,772	100%

== Csongrád-Csanád County ==
=== District 1 ===
Primary – Csongrád-Csanád 1
Party	Candidate	Votes	%
MSZP	Sándor Szabó	6,398	72.85%
DK	József Binszki	2,385	27.15%
Total votes		8,783	100%

=== District 2 ===
Primary – Csongrád-Csanád 2
Party	Candidate	Votes	%
Momentum	Edvin Mihálik	3,866	50.48%
Jobbik	Péter Tóth	2,377	31.04%
Independent	Szabolcs Tóth (Note: Supported by MMN, accepted into parliamentary group by Momentum)	1,415	18.48%
Total votes		7,658	100%

=== District 3 ===
Primary – Csongrád-Csanád 3
Party	Candidate	Votes	%
Jobbik	Ildikó Szűcs	2,786	54.21%
Momentum	Viktor Borsik	1,476	28.72%
ÚVNP	Gábor Mészáros	877	17.07%
Total votes		5,139	100%

=== District 4 ===
Primary – Csongrád-Csanád 4
Party	Candidate	Votes	%
ÚVNP	Péter Márki-Zay (Note: Supported by MMN, beside ÚVNP, also accepted into parliamentary group by PM)	5,249	81.57%
DK	Tamás Mucsi	1,186	18.43%
Total votes		6,435	100%

== Fejér County ==
=== District 1 ===
Primary – Fejér 1
Party	Candidate	Votes	%
MSZP	Roland Márton	3,057	55.61%
DK	Judit Ráczné Földi	2,440	44.39%
Total votes		5,497	100%

=== District 2 ===
Primary – Fejér 2
Party	Candidate	Votes	%
Jobbik	Attila Fazakas	3,189	91.17%
Independent	Sándor But (Note: Supported by ÚVNP, accepted into parliamentary group by PM)	309	8.83%
Total votes		3,498	100%

=== District 3 ===
Primary – Fejér 3
Party	Candidate	Votes	%
DK	Péter Balázs	2,823	67.23%
Momentum	András József	825	19.65%
Independent	János Bogdán (Note: Supported by MMN, accepted into parliamentary group by PM)	551	13.12%
Total votes		4,199	100%

=== District 4 ===
Primary – Fejér 4
Party	Candidate	Votes	%
Jobbik	Gergely Kálló	5,349	83.76%
Momentum	Janka Kovács	1,037	16.24%
Total votes		6,386	100%

=== District 5 ===
Primary – Fejér 5
Party	Candidate	Votes	%
DK	Éva Kertész	1,787	72.91%
ÚVNP	Tibor Gottlóz (Note: Supported by MMN, beside ÚVNP, also accepted into parliamentary group by LMP)	343	13.99%
Independent	Zsolt Orosvári (Note: Supported and accepted into parliamentary group by Momentum)	321	13.10%
Total votes		2,451	100%

== Győr-Moson-Sopron County ==
=== District 1 ===
Primary – Győr-Moson-Sopron 1
Party	Candidate	Votes	%
DK	Zita Jancsó	3,200	54.92%
Momentum	Tibor Rehó	2,627	45.08%
Total votes		5,827	100%

=== District 2 ===
Primary – Győr-Moson-Sopron 2
Party	Candidate	Votes	%
DK	László Gasztonyi	2,444	52.03%
MSZP	István Juhász	1,037	22.08%
Independent	Jenő Balla	769	16.37%
Independent	Eszter Németh	447	9.52%
Total votes		4,697	100%

=== District 3 ===
Primary – Győr-Moson-Sopron 3
Party	Candidate	Votes	%
MSZP	Ildikó Kovácsné Varga	1,630	61.19%
Momentum	Krisztián Orbán	1,034	38.81%
Total votes		2,664	100%

=== District 4 ===
Primary – Győr-Moson-Sopron 4
Party	Candidate	Votes	%
Jobbik	Koloman Brenner	3,237	72.21%
PM	Adrienn Jakál	1,246	27.79%
Total votes		4,483	100%

=== District 5 ===
Primary – Győr-Moson-Sopron 5
Party	Candidate	Votes	%
Jobbik	Zoltán Magyar	3,363	77.60%
Momentum	Endre Balázs	971	22.40%
Total votes		4,334	100%

== Hajdú-Bihar County ==
=== District 1 ===
Primary – Hajdú-Bihar 1
Party	Candidate	Votes	%
DK	Zoltán Varga	2,758	44.61%
ÚVNP	József Pálinkás (Note: Beside ÚVNP, also accepted into parliamentary group by Jobbik)	1,665	26.93%
Momentum	Bence Szabó	1,586	25.66%
Independent	Mariann Illés-Rácz (Note: Candidate of the Civic Forum Debrecen, accepted into parliamentary group by Jobbik)	173	2.80%
Total votes		6,182	100%

=== District 2 ===
Primary – Hajdú-Bihar 2
Party	Candidate	Votes	%
Momentum	László Mándi	2,946	54.87%
DK	Imre Vaszkó	2,180	40.60%
Independent	Olivér Fülep	243	4.53%
Total votes		5,369	100%

=== District 3 ===
Primary – Hajdú-Bihar 3
Party	Candidate	Votes	%
Jobbik	Gergő Salamon	1,303	35.67%
DK	Károly Szörényi	1,056	28.91%
Momentum	Mihály Kosztin	845	23.13%
PM	Sándor Szórádi	363	9.93%
Independent	Zsolt Szabó	87	2.38%
Total votes		3,654	100%

=== District 4 ===
Primary – Hajdú-Bihar 4
Party	Candidate	Votes	%
Momentum	László Szántai	1,090	44.65%
DK	Patrik Szabó	761	31.18%
MSZP	Judit Bihary	590	24.17%
Total votes		2,441	100%

=== District 5 ===
Primary – Hajdú-Bihar 5
Party	Candidate	Votes	%
Momentum	László Kiss	1,655	54.49%
MSZP	Ildikó Bangóné Borbély	1,382	45.51%
Total votes		3,037	100%

=== District 6 ===
Primary – Hajdú-Bihar 6
Party	Candidate	Votes	%
Jobbik	Péter Hegedüs	2,010	39.66%
DK	József Tóth	1,966	38.79%
Independent	Zsolt Sándor Tömöri	1,092	21.55%
Total votes		5,068	100%

== Heves County ==
=== District 1 ===
Primary – Heves 1
Party	Candidate	Votes	%
DK	Mátyás Berecz	3,942	72.34%
Momentum	Zoltán Jánosi	1,507	27.66%
Total votes		5,449	100%

=== District 2 ===
Primary – Heves 2
Party	Candidate	Votes	%
Jobbik	Róbert Dudás	4,781	100%
Total votes		4,781	100%

=== District 3 ===
Primary – Heves 3
Party	Candidate	Votes	%
MSZP	Lajos Korózs	2,268	54.53%
Momentum	Lajos Lőcsei	1,372	32.99%
ÚVNP	Ferenc Varga	519	12.48%
Total votes		4,159	100%

== Jász-Nagykun-Szolnok ==
=== District 1 ===
Primary – Jász-Nagykun-Szolnok 1
Party	Candidate	Votes	%
DK	Pál Sziráki	4,092	63.83%
LMP	Áron Tóth	1,175	18.33%
Momentum	Irén Kármán	1,144	17.84%
Total votes		6,411	100%

=== District 2 ===
Primary – Jász-Nagykun-Szolnok 2
Party	Candidate	Votes	%
MSZP	Ottó Kertész	1,627	58.78%
DK	József Gedei	1,141	41.22%
Total votes		2,768	100%

=== District 3 ===
Primary – Jász-Nagykun-Szolnok 3
Party	Candidate	Votes	%
Jobbik	László György Lukács	3,121	80.07%
DK	Vilmos Turó	593	15.21%
Momentum	Dániel Kozma	184	4.72%
Total votes		3,898	100%

=== District 4 ===
Primary – Jász-Nagykun-Szolnok 4
Party	Candidate	Votes	%
Jobbik	Tamás Csányi	4,135	100%
Total votes		4,135	100%

== Komárom-Esztergom County ==
=== District 1 ===
Primary – Komárom-Esztergom 1
Party	Candidate	Votes	%
DK	Erik Konczer	4,773	67.22%
MSZP	Zita Gurmai	2,328	32.78%
Total votes		7,101	100%

=== District 2 ===
Primary – Komárom-Esztergom 2
Party	Candidate	Votes	%
Jobbik	Tibor Nunkovics	4,841	100%
Total votes		4,841	100%

=== District 3 ===
Primary – Komárom-Esztergom 3
Party	Candidate	Votes	%
Independent	Andrea Nemes	3,223	57.05%
Jobbik	Gábor Szanyi	2,426	42.95%
Total votes		5,649	100%

== Nógrád County ==
=== District 1 ===
Primary – Nógrád 1
Party	Candidate	Votes	%
DK	Beatrix Godó	2,777	57.47%
Momentum	Ferenc Horváth	1,280	26.49%
ÚVNP	Gábor Dömsödi	775	16.04%
Total votes		4,832	100%

=== District 2 ===
Primary – Nógrád 2
Party	Candidate	Votes	%
Momentum	Szilárd Gyenes (Note: Member of the ÚK, supported and accepted into parliamentary group by Momentum)	2,394	100%
Total votes		2,394	100%

== Pest County ==
=== District 1 ===
Primary – Pest 1
Party	Candidate	Votes	%
DK	Anett Bősz	5,586	60.79%
LMP	Örs Tetlák	1,956	21.29%
Momentum	Marco Ollero	1,647	17.92%
Total votes		9,189	100%

=== District 2 ===
Primary – Pest 2
Party	Candidate	Votes	%
Momentum	Bernadett Szél	10,182	81.32%
DK	Beáta Hegyesi	2,339	18.68%
Total votes		12,521	100%

=== District 3 ===
Primary – Pest 3
Party	Candidate	Votes	%
Momentum	György Buzinkay	3,313	37.37%
Jobbik	Gábor Pál	3,028	34.15%
Independent	György Kóder (Note: Supported by MMN, accepted into parliamentary group by LMP)	1,698	19.15%
Independent	Andrea Katona	827	9.33%
Total votes		8,866	100%

=== District 4 ===
Primary – Pest 4
Party	Candidate	Votes	%
Independent	Gergely Inotay (Note: Supported and accepted into parliamentary group by Jobbik)	2,766	48.48%
ÚVNP	Béla Róbert Juhász	2,416	42.35%
Independent	Ádám Gyurcsik	523	9.17%
Total votes		5,705	100%

=== District 5 ===
Primary – Pest 5
Party	Candidate	Votes	%
PM	Dávid Dorosz	6,687	62.48%
DK	Péter Tonzor	3,519	32.88%
ÚVNP	László Fekete	496	4.63%
Total votes		10,702	100%

=== District 6 ===
Primary – Pest 6
Party	Candidate	Votes	%
LMP	Krisztina Hohn (Note: Member of the ÚK, supported and accepted into parliamentary group by LMP)	3,348	44.51%
ÚVNP	Erika Simon (Note: Beside ÚVNP, also accepted into parliamentary group by DK)	2,374	31.56%
Momentum	Zoltán Varga	1,800	23.93%
Total votes		7,522	100%

=== District 7 ===
Primary – Pest 7
Party	Candidate	Votes	%
Jobbik	Péter Fricsovszky-Tóth	4,320	63.50%
Momentum	Alexandra Farag	2,483	36.50%
Total votes		6,803	100%

=== District 8 ===
Primary – Pest 8
Party	Candidate	Votes	%
DK	Teodóra Jószai	4,109	51.30%
Jobbik	János Nagy	3,900	48.70%
Total votes		8,009	100%

=== District 9 ===
Primary – Pest 9
Party	Candidate	Votes	%
LMP	Erzsébet Schmuck	2,685	100%
Total votes		2,685	100%

=== District 10 ===
Primary – Pest 10
Party	Candidate	Votes	%
PM	Mihály Gér	2,772	69.95%
DK	Máté Magdics	1,191	30.05%
Total votes		3,963	100%

Winner candidate Mihály Gér withdrew from his candidacy on 14 February 2022, after his insensitive comments he made on social media after a deadly car accident involving him in 2016 were brought to light. He was replaced as candidate of the joint opposition by fellow Dialogue for Hungary member Rebeka Szabó.

=== District 11 ===
Primary – Pest 11
Party	Candidate	Votes	%
DK	Ágota Jánosi-Lesi	2,628	56.81%
Momentum	Zombor Andrejka	1,998	43.19%
Total votes		4,626	100%

=== District 12 ===
Primary – Pest 12
Party	Candidate	Votes	%
Jobbik	Nándor Zágráb	2,645	73.70%
MSZP	Ferenc László	508	14.15%
Independent	Mihály Sipos	436	12.15%
Total votes		3,589	100%

== Somogy County ==
=== District 1 ===
Primary – Somogy 1
Party	Candidate	Votes	%
DK	István Varga	2,844	57.64%
Jobbik	Ákos Ervin Horváth	1,580	32.02%
Momentum	Dávid Bereczki	510	10.34%
Total votes		4,934	100%

=== District 2 ===
Primary – Somogy 2
Party	Candidate	Votes	%
Jobbik	Balázs Ander	2,828	77.52%
DK	Gábor Remes	820	22.48%
Total votes		3,648	100%

=== District 3 ===
Primary – Somogy 3
Party	Candidate	Votes	%
Jobbik	Ádám Steinmetz	2,464	100%
Total votes		2,464	100%

=== District 4 ===
Primary – Somogy 4
Party	Candidate	Votes	%
Jobbik	Anita Potocskáné Kőrösi	2,985	66.07%
DK	Miklós Kovács	1,533	33.93%
Total votes		4,518	100%

== Szabolcs-Szatmár-Bereg County ==
=== District 1 ===
Primary – Szabolcs-Szatmár-Bereg 1
Party	Candidate	Votes	%
Jobbik	Máté Lengyel	4,463	80.17%
Momentum	József István Csipkés	1,104	19.83%
Total votes		5,567	100%

=== District 2 ===
Primary – Szabolcs-Szatmár-Bereg 2
Party	Candidate	Votes	%
MSZP	Gábor Aranyos	1,389	48.58%
Jobbik	Csaba Gyüre	956	33.44%
ÚVNP	Krisztián Kiss	514	17.98%
Total votes		2,859	100%

=== District 3 ===
Primary – Szabolcs-Szatmár-Bereg 3
Party	Candidate	Votes	%
Jobbik	Viktor Tóth	1,409	59.73%
MSZP	Zoltán Sárosy	950	40.27%
Total votes		2,359	100%

=== District 4 ===
Primary – Szabolcs-Szatmár-Bereg 4
Party	Candidate	Votes	%
DK	Mónika Sápi	1,072	52.55%
MSZP	Csilla Bíróné Dienes	968	47.45%
Total votes		2,040	100%

=== District 5 ===
Primary – Szabolcs-Szatmár-Bereg 5
Party	Candidate	Votes	%
Jobbik	István Földi	2,225	66.90%
MSZP	Ildikó Papp	1,101	33.10%
Total votes		3,326	100%

=== District 6 ===
Primary – Szabolcs-Szatmár-Bereg 6
Party	Candidate	Votes	%
MSZP	Viktor Tóth	1,251	40.13%
Jobbik	Béla Bélteki	1,226	39.33%
DK	Alexandra Czirják	517	16.59%
Momentum	Milán Pradlik	123	3.95%
Total votes		3,117	100%

== Tolna County ==
=== District 1 ===
Primary – Tolna 1
Party	Candidate	Votes	%
MSZP	Tamás Harangozó	2,617	55.61%
Jobbik	Róbert Bozsolik	2,089	44.39%
Total votes		4,706	100%

=== District 2 ===
Primary – Tolna 2
Party	Candidate	Votes	%
DK	Loránd Szabó	1,609	57.98%
Momentum	Zoltán Száraz	1,166	42.02%
Total votes		2,775	100%

=== District 3 ===
Primary – Tolna 3
Party	Candidate	Votes	%
Jobbik	János Bencze	1,423	55.28%
DK	Attila Szilveszter Tóth	1,151	44.72%
Total votes		2,574	100%

== Vas County ==
=== District 1 ===
Primary – Vas 1
Party	Candidate	Votes	%
DK	Csaba Czeglédy	3,837	50.43%
LMP	Péter Ungár	3,661	48.12%
ÚVNP	Tibor Koczka	110	1.45%
Total votes		7,608	100%

=== District 2 ===
Primary – Vas 2
Party	Candidate	Votes	%
MSZP	Kornél Hencz	1,411	47.41%
DK	Tamás Szilágyi	1,063	35.72%
Momentum	Gábor Bányai-Németh	502	16.87%
Total votes		2,976	100%

=== District 3 ===
Primary – Vas 3
Party	Candidate	Votes	%
LMP	Tibor Bana	2,107	66.83%
Momentum	Dániel Pleva	1,046	33.17%
Total votes		3,153	100%

== Veszprém County ==
=== District 1 ===
Primary – Veszprém 1
Party	Candidate	Votes	%
DK	Balázs Csonka	3,689	66.95%
MSZP	Attila Mesterházy	1,821	33.05%
Total votes		5,510	100%

=== District 2 ===
Primary – Veszprém 2
Party	Candidate	Votes	%
DK	Szilveszter Benedek	2,909	57.87%
Momentum	Andrea Szecsődi	2,118	42.13%
Total votes		5,027	100%

=== District 3 ===
Primary – Veszprém 3
Party	Candidate	Votes	%
Jobbik	Lajos Rig	3,598	100%
Total votes		3,598	100%

=== District 4 ===
Primary – Veszprém 4
Party	Candidate	Votes	%
MSZP	Attila Grőber	2,042	64.10%
Jobbik	Zsolt Süle	760	23.85%
Momentum	István Jádi	384	12.05%
Total votes		3,186	100%

== Zala County ==
=== District 1 ===
Primary – Zala 1
Party	Candidate	Votes	%
DK	Irén Csidai	1,928	40.63%
Independent	Gábor Föőr	1,025	21.60%
Momentum	Dóra Plesz	911	19.20%
Jobbik	Richárd Benke	618	13.02%
LMP	Zoltán Paksy	263	5.54%
Total votes		4,745	100%

=== District 2 ===
Primary – Zala 2
Party	Candidate	Votes	%
Momentum	István Elekes	1,280	39.29%
MSZP	Zoltán Czuth	1,196	36.71%
ÚVNP	Tibor Molnár	782	24.00%
Total votes		3,258	100%

=== District 3 ===
Primary – Zala 3
Party	Candidate	Votes	%
DK	Jácint Horváth	2,956	65.59%
Jobbik	Krisztián Berta	1,551	34.41%
Total votes		4,507	100%

== Sources ==
- Results of the 2021 Hungarian opposition primary results by constituency
