= Gábor Kuncze =

Hungarian politician (born 1950)

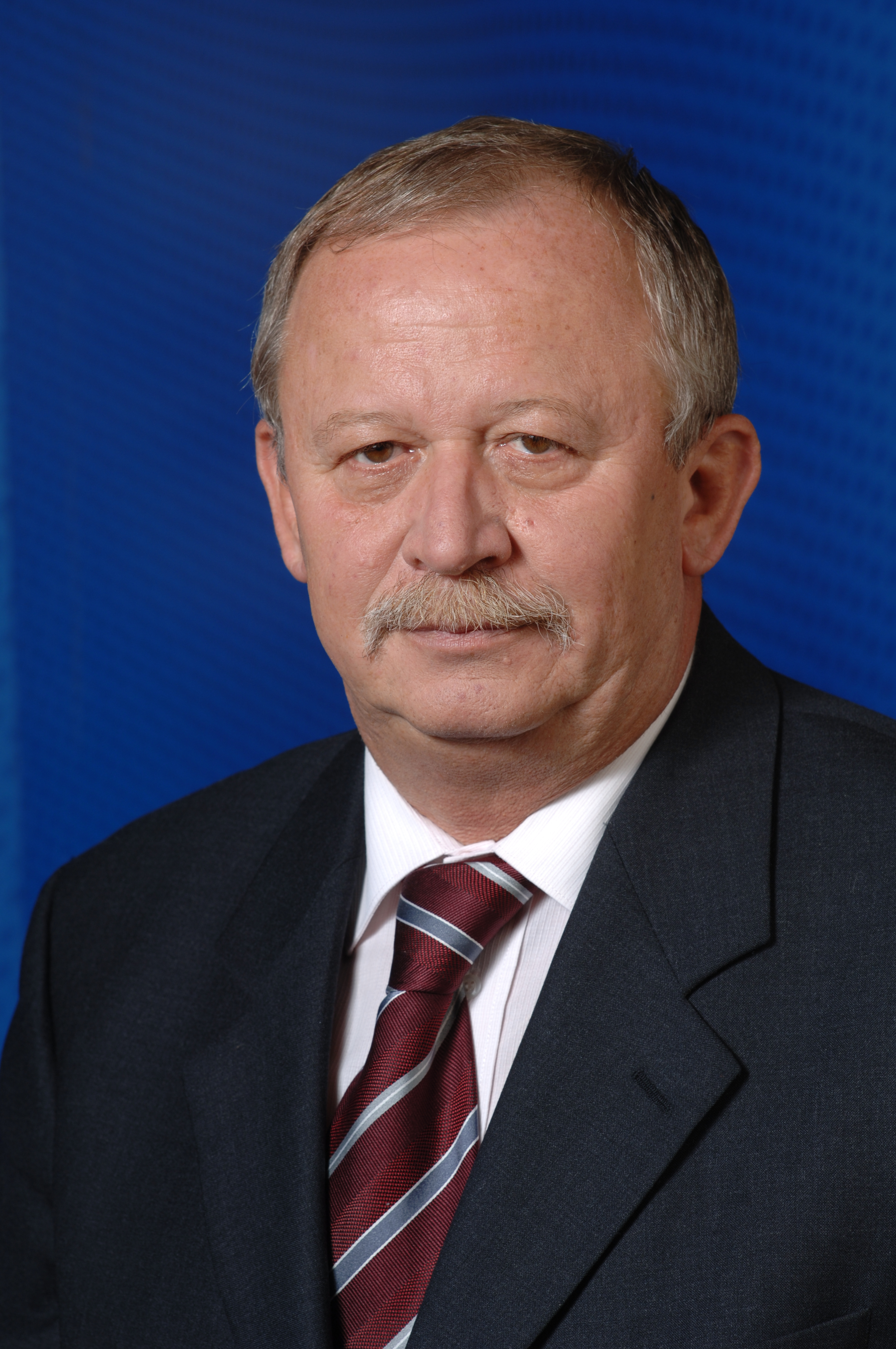

Minister of the Interior of Hungary
- In office 15 July 1994 – 8 July 1998
- Prime Minister: Gyula Horn
- Preceded by: Imre Kónya
- Succeeded by: Sándor Pintér

Personal details
- Born: 4 November 1950 (age 75) Pápa, Hungary
- Party: SZDSZ
- Spouse: Katalin Kunczéné Fellegi
- Profession: politician

Gábor Kuncze (born 4 November 1950 in Pápa) is a Hungarian liberal politician, former chairman of the Hungarian Alliance of Free Democrats (SZDSZ). He became anchorman at the radio channel Klubrádió in 2008 while he was still an SZDSZ member of Parliament. Later, in 2010, he also became a host for the television channel ATV. Kuncze was later dismissed from ATV's morning program, which was taken over by Egon Rónai.

== Biography ==
Kuncze was born in Pápa in 1950. After graduating from the piarist grammar school in Kecskemét he studied geotechnical engineering in the Ybl Miklós Technical College in Budapest and graduated from there in 1974. Later he got a degree of Economics specialized in Industry Management and Organization. Kuncze is married to mathematics teacher Katalin Fellegi.

=== Political career ===
Kuncze joined the party in August 1992, two years after the first free and democratic parliamentary elections following the collapse of the Communist system. In November 1992 he was elected a member of the National Assembly and in October 1994 a member of the National Executive Committee of the party. From April 1997 until June 1998 he was the chairman of the Alliance of Free Democrats. He retired from his position following the party's relatively weak results on the 1998 parliamentary elections. However, he took over the liberal party again on 1 July 2001 and was reelected as party chairman in 2003 and 2005. In 2006 Kuncze announced not to run for the chair in the following year or any executive positions in the future.

Kuncze was a member of parliament since 1990. He was the leader of the Parliament group of the party from 1993 to 1994, and from 1994 until 1998 Minister of Interior and Deputy Prime Minister. After 1998 - as one of the leading opposition politicians in the parliament - he heavily criticised the work of Orbán's government. He initiated the introduction of a two-level minimum salary system, but his proposal was not negotiated by the National Assembly - that time with a right-wing majority. He also heavily criticised the governing Fidesz for their decision to hold plenary sessions of the unicameral National Assembly only every third week.

In 2006 he called Fidesz parliamentarian Máriusz Révész, who was attacked and injured by police during the 2006 protests in Hungary "Martyrius". Révész had parliamentary immunity at the time and as such police had no right to use force against him.

In February 2009, Kuncze again made a controversial statement. In Klubrádió he was speaking with Tibor Dessewffy, an advisor to prime minister Ferenc Gyurcsány. In the program, while talking about the very low level of public mood (according to Kuncze, completely unjustified), recommended handing out cyanide tablets to the people who were feeling miserable.

Gábor Kuncze: (...) I know a great number of people who are living much much better than say ten, fifteen years ago, and they are in such a lethargy from this horrible country and this horrible situation that one would very much like to give cyanide tablets to them so they could get over their problems already. Of course this would not be a solution. Tibor Dessewffy: And this whole thing is a really great problem, since the middle class cannot understand that they are moving higher, just because there are still a very large group of people who are in really big trouble

— from the Klubrádió program

The Hungarian media authority, ORTT, have declined to investigate the matter. Kuncze later apologised for his remarks, saying they were ill-conceived.

== Personal life ==
He is married. His wife is Katalin Kunczéné Fellegi.

National Assembly of Hungary
Preceded by Márton Tardos	Leader of the SZDSZ parliamentary group 1993–1994	Succeeded by Iván Pető
Preceded by István Szent-Iványi	Leader of the SZDSZ parliamentary group 1998–2000	Succeeded by István Szent-Iványi
Preceded by István Szent-Iványi	Leader of the SZDSZ parliamentary group 2002–2007	Succeeded by Mátyás Eörsi
Political offices
Preceded by Imre Kónya	Minister of the Interior; 1994–1998	Succeeded by Sándor Pintér
Party political offices
Preceded by Iván Pető	President of the Alliance of Free Democrats; 1997–1998	Succeeded by Bálint Magyar
Preceded by Gábor Demszky	President of the Alliance of Free Democrats; 2001–2007	Succeeded by János Kóka
