= 2008 Hungarian fees abolition referendum =

Nation-wide three-question referendum

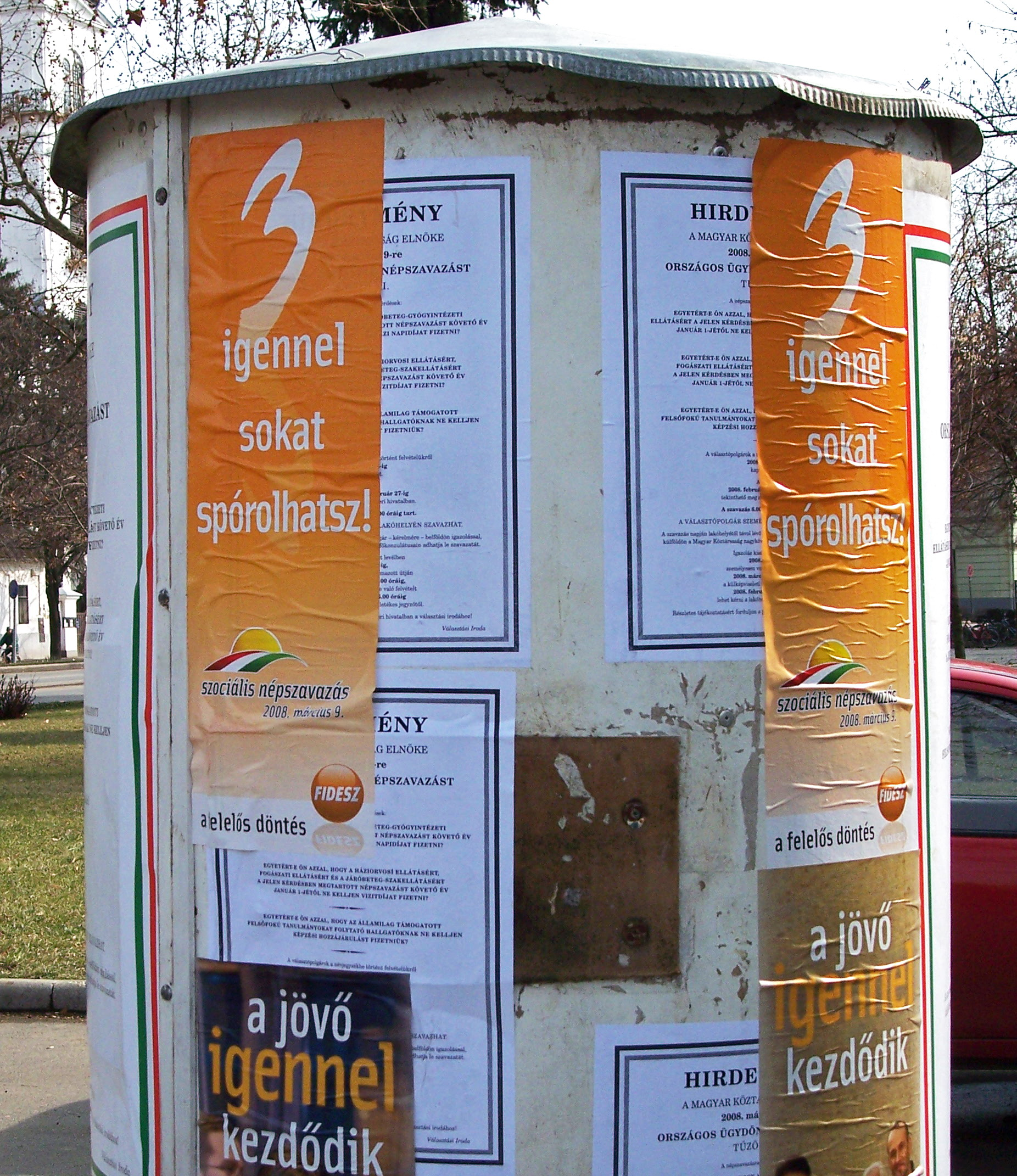
Fidesz posters at Hungarian fees abolishment referendum, 2008.

A referendum on revoking some medical and tuition fees was held in Hungary on 9 March 2008. The proposals would cancel government reforms which introduced doctor visit fees paid per visitation and medical fees paid per number of days spent in hospital as well as tuition fees in higher education. All three were supported by a majority of voters. Prime Minister Ferenc Gyurcsány stated that the fees would be abolished on 1 April 2008 following the referendum, but that the government had no funds available to replace the income lost for the higher educations institutions and health institutions due to the abolishment of the fees.

== Background ==
The referendum was initiated by opposition party Fidesz against the ruling Hungarian Socialist Party (MSZP). The procedure for the referendum started on 23 October 2006, when Viktor Orbán, the leader of Fidesz – Hungarian Civic Union announced they would hand in seven questions to the National Electorate Office, three of which (on abolishing co-payments, daily fees and college tuition fees) were officially approved on 17 December 2007 and called on 24 January 2008. It was assumed likely that the referendum would pass, but it was uncertain whether turnout would be high enough to make it valid; polls indicated about 40% turnout with 80% in favour of rescinding the three reforms.

To be valid, the referendum required at least 25% of the about 8 million eligible voters to vote in favour of one of the options.

== Questions ==
Hungarian text	English translation
Egyetért-e Ön azzal, hogy a fekvőbeteg-gyógyintézeti ellátásért a jelen kérdésben megtartott népszavazást követő év január 1-jétől ne kelljen kórházi napidíjat fizetni?	Do you agree that inpatient care should be exempt from daily hospital fees with effect from 1 January in the year after the referendum is held on the present issue?
Egyetért-e Ön azzal, hogy a háziorvosi ellátásért, fogászati ellátásért és a járóbeteg-szakellátásért a jelen kérdésben megtartott népszavazást követő év január 1-jétől ne kelljen vizitdíjat fizetni?	Do you agree that family doctor care, dentistry care and special outpatient care should be exempt from consultation fees with effect from 1 January in the year after the referendum is held on the present issue?
Egyetért-e Ön azzal, hogy az államilag támogatott felsőfokú tanulmányokat folytató hallgatóknak ne kelljen képzési hozzájárulást fizetni?	Do you agree that students in state-subsidised higher education should be exempt from tuition fees?

== Results ==
Question	For		Against		Invalid/ blank	Total votes	Registered voters	Turnout	Outcome
Question	Votes	%	Votes	%	Invalid/ blank	Total votes	Registered voters	Turnout	Outcome
Inpatient care exempt from daily hospital fees	3,385,981	84.1	640,936	15.9	32,268	4,059,185	8,040,125	50.5	Approved
Exemptions from consultation fees	3,321,313	82.4	708,283	17.6	29,605	4,059,201	8,040,125	50.5	Approved
Higher education tuition fee exemption	3,309,616	82.2	715,642	17.8	33,863	4,059,121	8,040,125	50.5	Approved
Source: Nohlen & Stöver, National Election Office

=== Turnout ===
On the day of the referendum, the following turnout data was reported:

Time	%
By 07:00	1.13
By 09:00	7.66
By 11:00	18.69
By 13:00	26.92
By 15:00	35.71
By 17:30	46.34
By 19:00	50.48

Voting was possible between 6:00 and 19:00. Official results showed that the necessary votes were achieved, with a turnout of over 50% (higher than opinion polls had expected).

== Aftermath ==
The MSZP–SZDSZ coalition suffered a heavy defeat. After Prime Minister Ferenc Gyurcsány intended to dismiss Health Minister Ágnes Horváth (SZDSZ), the relationship between the two parties permanently deteriorated. On 31 March 2008, various reform-related disagreements between the MSZP and SZDSZ led the SZDSZ leader János Kóka to announce that his party would quit the coalition by 1 May 2008. This also meant that the MSZP formed the first minority government in Hungary since the end of communism, supported externally by SZDSZ.
