= Unity (Hungary) =

Unity Összefogás
- Leader: Attila Mesterházy (Note: Candidate for Prime Minister in the 2014 election.)
- Founded: 14 January 2014
- Dissolved: 6 April 2014
- Succeeded by: United for Hungary
- Ideology: Liberalism; Social liberalism Social democracy Green liberalism Green politics Pro-Europeanism
- Political position: Centre-left

Unity (Hungarian: Összefogás), also called Left Unity (Hungarian: Baloldali összefogás) was the informal name of a short-lived centre-left political alliance in Hungary of five political parties formed for contesting the 2014 Hungarian parliamentary election.

The parties involved were the Hungarian Socialist Party (MSZP), Together 2014 (E14), Democratic Coalition (DK), Dialogue for Hungary (PM) and Hungarian Liberal Party (MLP).

It was dissolved in aftermath of the alliance's poor results.

== Members ==
Party	Leader	Ideology	Candidates (2014)		
Party	Leader	Ideology	Constituency (106)	Party-list (60)	Seats won (38)
Hungarian Socialist Party	Attila Mesterházy	Social democracy	71	42	29
Together 2014–Dialogue for Hungary	Gordon Bajnai; Benedek Jávor	Social liberalism Green liberalism Green politics	22	9	4 (3+1)
Democratic Coalition	Ferenc Gyurcsány	Social liberalism	13	6	4
Hungarian Liberal Party	Gábor Fodor	Liberalism	0	3	1

== Election results ==
Election year	National Assembly			Government
Election year	# of overall votes	% of overall vote	# of overall seats won	Government
2014	1,290,806	25.57%	38 / 199	Opposition

== See also ==
- 2014 Hungarian parliamentary election
- United for Hungary (2020-2022)
- DK–MSZP–Dialogue (2024)
