= Klubrádió =

- Budapest; Hungary

Programming
- Language: Hungarian
- Format: Commercial talk and news radio

Ownership
- Owner: András Arató

History
- First air date: 12 April 1999
- Last air date: 14 February 2021 (FM)
- Former frequencies: 92.9 MHz (2010–2021)

Technical information
- Power: 2 kW

Links
- Website: https://www.klubradio.hu/

Klubrádió is a commercial talk and news radio station based in Budapest, Hungary. Klubrádió is often labeled as the voice of the left-liberal opposition. Many on the right and far-right find it important to emphasize what they perceive as the political bias of Klubrádió by pointing to the fact that Klubrádió has hired a liberal politician as a host since 2008. The then-active SZDSZ MP, also former party chairman Gábor Kuncze was the Minister of Interior appointed by the liberal party, SZDSZ. Socialist Prime Minister Ferenc Gyurcsány also hosted once a program on Klubrádió while in office. Klubrádió was started broadcasting in April 1999, as the official radio of the Hungarian Auto Club (HAC). After HAC sold the station to Monográf Zrt, the original programming of the Auto Club changed, and the broadcast format was completely transformed into a talk and news station.

In 2020, Klubrádió lost its radio frequency due to a change in requirements by the National Media and Infocommunications Authority of Hungary. This act later condemned by the Court of Justice of the European Union as against fundamental rights including freedom of speech and freedom of information. Klubrádió still continues operations on the internet.

== 1998: Change in ownership and format ==
Hungarian Auto Club decided to participate in a tender for two Budapest-based frequencies offered by ORTT (95.3 and 102.1 MHz). After winning 95.3 MHz in 1998 December, the Auto Club hired staff and built up a studio. Broadcast started in April 1999. Oszkár Hegedűs, president of the HAC, was the first to speak on the air. This made the Hungarian Auto Club the first of the European auto clubs broadcasting 24 hours a day.

After some two years on the air, the leadership of the HAC decided to sell the company for undisclosed reasons. HAC raised the equity of Klubrádió by 145 million forints and immediately sold 100 million forints worth of shares to Monográf Rt. in October 2001, not long before the 2002 elections in Hungary. Monográf Rt. was founded in 2001 September, one month prior to gaining controlling stake in Klubrádió. The headquarters of Monográf was in the same building as the publisher of the left-wing weekly 168 óra. Monográf, whose ownership at that time had close ties to the SZDSZ party, acquired Klubrádió from the Hungarian Auto Club, even though other bidders offered more. In the second half of 2002, the consortium gained 100% ownership in Klubrádió.

With this change, the original Klubrádió owned by the actual Autó Klub (HAC), together with the traffic radio format in Hungary, disappeared after having the approval of the media authority (ORTT). Only the name and frequency remained whereas the format and the programs offered were completely changed. This way the program structure of the station became completely different from the one presented and approved in the 1998 tender. However, since Auto Klub offered many public service broadcasts in the tender, such as frequent traffic news, the license fee for the station was considerably less than that of a commercial radio. The ORTT in 2001 approved the change, enabling the new opinion and news profile of Klubrádió. The Orbán- government's delegates had the minority in ORTT at the time. Since the departments are staffed based on the election mandates and Fidesz - KDNP holds 67% of the parliamentary majority, it is not surprising that all state departments, including the ORTT had Fidesz - KDNP majority in 2011. The licence awarded for the frequency had a duration of twelve years and expired in February 2011.

== 1998–2010: Decade of Independence ==
Klubrádió had its first broadcast with the new format on 10 December 2001. Klubrádió provides a live internet broadcast on its website 24 hours a day. Many programs are also downloadable in mp3 format. In 2007 Klubrádió have attempted to perform a live broadcast from Debrecen, but protesters demonstrating against the allegedly biased coverage of Klubrádió have caused the station to interrupt its programming. Lajos Kósa, the mayor of Debrecen condemned the „extreme opinions" of both the demonstrators and of Klubrádió. In 2009 there was a tender in which Danubius and Slager radio owned by UK and US companies respectively, have participated. The ORTT at the time, dominated by MSZP and SZDSZ members awarded the frequency to two startups, dislodging the previous owners. Klubrádió (a staunch supporter of both MSZP and SZDSZ) have supported that decision. An anchor of the station, György Bolgár have said on Klubrádió that, the company who is willing to pay the most money for a frequency should be proclaimed the winner. However, it turned out to be later that the cited sentence was cut out of its context. In 2005, Socialist Prime Minister, Ferenc Gyurcsány took on the role of host in Klubrádió. PM Gyurcsány anchored the 500th edition of Kontra, one of Klubrádió's prime-time shows hosted by József Orosz. Apart from PM Gyurcsány, other well-known personalities hosted the show, for example István Szabó Academy Awarded director and Ibolya Dávid, then-president of MDF. Anchorman Mr. Orosz also invited President Mr. Orbán of Fidesz, but he did not even respond.

In 2010, Ferenc Vicsek became the editor-in-chief for Klubrádió, saying he will introduce a few non political programs as well. In 2007 Gábor Rudas, and Ákos Ablonczy, both in management positions, left Klubrádió. The press cited stagnant listenership as the reason of their departure. András Arató gained more and more control in the company after that point. Today, he is considered to be both the owner and the manager of Klubrádió. Klubrádió often uses unidentified callers in some of its programming for saving their anonymity on call-in programs. In addition, callers always have the right to reveal their identity. A case became controversial after an unidentified caller falsely accused the Kruchina brothers of various violent acts allegedly committed on 2007 March 15, when they were in Germany. The claims of the caller were repeated multiple times on Klubrádió but when a reporter for index.hu, Tamás Bodoky have asked Bolgár for the contact information of the caller, Bolgár refused. The Kruchinas, with the help of Bodoky, then turned to ORTT, the data ombudsman, Attila Péterfalvi, and sued Klubrádió in court. Klubrádió and the unidentified caller finally had to pay damages exceeding two million forints for libel. In connection with the case it was alleged that Klubrádió uses organized callers to make various questionable statements, which would lead to larger legal exposure if said by a radio host.

== 2010–2013: Battle for Independence and Broadcast License ==
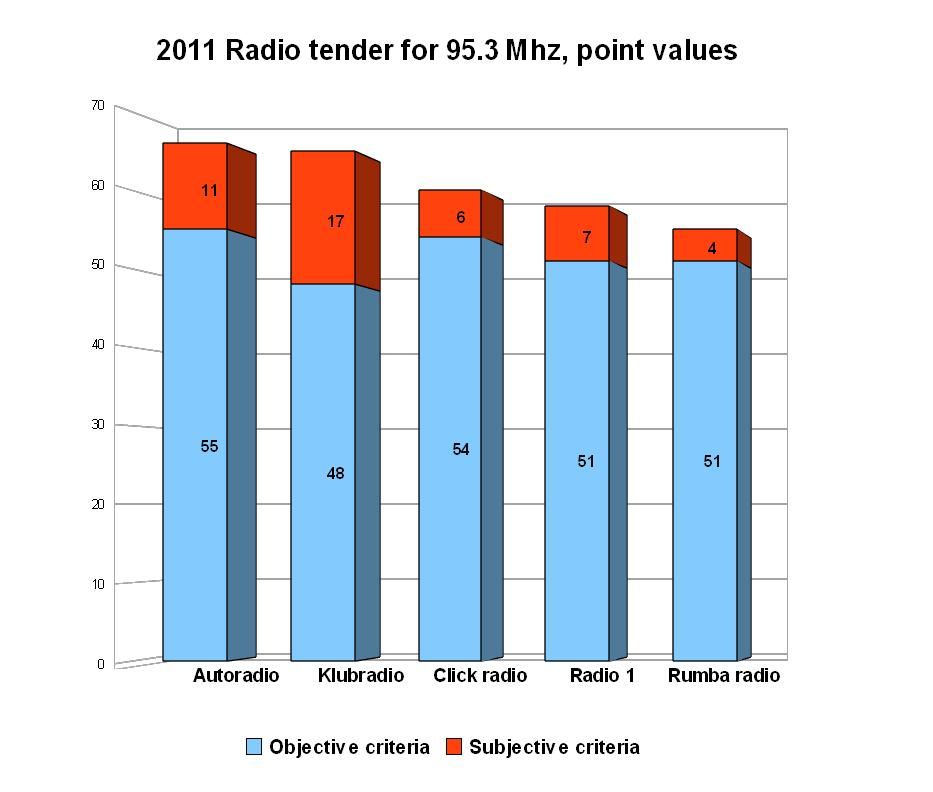
Points achieved in the tender for 95,3 MHz, Klubrádió received the fewest points on the so-called objective criteria and it could not overcome this disadvantage, even though it received maximal points in subjective categories, which were subject to

The parliamentary elections of 2010 caused a serious impact on the run of Klubrádió. The commercial station lost its financial integrity because many companies and agencies stopped advertising in Klubrádió for fearing of political consequences, and it almost went bankruptcy. After the victory of the right-wing party Fidesz securing the 2/3 majority in Parliament, Klubrádió became the number one enemy in the eye of the ruling party. In addition, in February, 2011, the broadcast license of Klubrádió expired but it continued broadcasting anyway due to temporary licenses, which were granted on a regular basis. Three tenders for three Budapest frequencies were advertised in mid-2011 with identical terms and conditions. Klubrádió have only submitted a tender offer for one of them, without providing a reason as to why it did not consider the others viable. The tender was preceded by intense lobbying for Klubrádió; various pressure groups tried to ensure that tender invitation is construed in such a way that only Klubrádió could win. Klubrádió had issued several suggestions in open hearings before the tender was finalized. First, Klubrádió suggested that the frequency should be based on the premise of public service frequency, where the license fee might be zero forints. If the frequency were to be a commercial frequency, Klubrádió have suggested a license fee of 6 million forints. During the actual tender, Klubrádió itself have offered to pay 55 million forints for the frequency, almost ten times of its original suggestion. This resulted in claims that the original Klubrádió suggestions were provocative. However, according to the tender, the would-be winner of 95,3 MHz should be broadcasting mainly music and local news that implied the possible loss of Klubrádió knowing a talk and news station would not have a chance to be in accordance with the new premises. After closing the tender, Autorádió gained first place for 95,3 MHz with 66 points, because Klubrádió refused to bid for the other two frequencies with identical terms, this raised the possibility of losing a Budapest frequency. Klubrádió came in second with 65 points, the pressure intensified to achieve overturning the decision. In Hungary, all tender decisions are subject to legal review, and when the management of Klubrádió launched a suit for the frequency, a court case began. Klubrádió did not argue that they should have received more points, rather they claimed that the winner's offer was „unrealistic" and should have been disqualified. Klubrádió added that they judged all bids over 53 million were „unrealistic". The argument would also disqualify Klubrádió's own bid of 55 million forints of yearly broadcasting fee. While the court case was still in progress, there were reports of more outside pressure trying to ensure Klubrádió's gain of the frequency. Klubrádió and the mainstream media also attacked the winners of the tender Autoradio for being a startup company without relevant experience in broadcasting, founded in early 2011, even though Monográf Rt, the owner of Klubrádió was just a month older at the time it acquired Klubrádió.

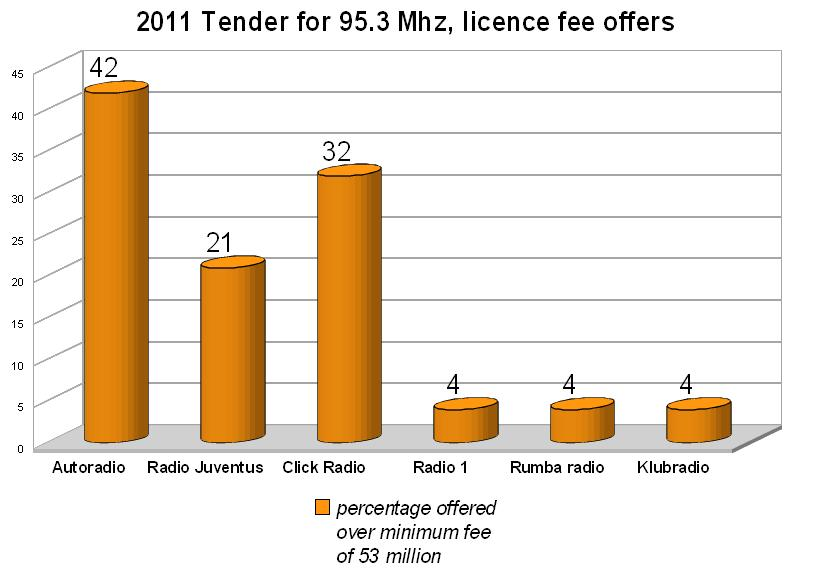
Klubrádió offered near the minimum amount at the 2011 tender for the 95,3Mhz frequency, only 4% more than the absolute minimum, the low monetary offer was the largest contribution to Klubrádió's Failure

Since the results of the other tenders (invited with identical terms and conditions as 95.3Mhz) were not attacked in court, the winner, Juventus radio was given the green light to start broadcasting on 1 February on 103,9 MHz. Juventus has to pay a yearly license fee of 52 million forints for using that frequency. Klubrádió submitted only a bid for a single one of three identical tenders, raising concerns that it was just a try in order to lose the bidding on purpose. Klubrádió's financial offer was also inferior to other tender participants, as well as conditions offered. After the results of Klubrádió's second place were announced, an intense media campaign was immediately launched by Klubrádió.

According to The New York Times, "The clash has become emblematic of what critics call a bald attempt by the Orbán government to tighten its grip on the news media, the judiciary, the central bank and education, and the inability of the European Union, which Hungary joined in 2004, to restrain a government not cleaving to the bloc’s democratic standards." (19 March 2013)

For two years, Hungary's news media council, which hands out radio frequencies and is stacked with Mr. Orbán's supporters, refused to renew Klubrádió's long-term frequency, despite three court rulings in the station's favor. Instead, it initially awarded Klubrádió's frequency to an unknown broadcaster that then mysteriously disappeared. In January 2012, amid great political unrest, 10,000 people rallied in support of the station.

Klubrádió has been still operating and on the air every day on the Budapest frequency as of January 2012, and the station owns several other frequencies countryside. The court case launched by Klubrádió had the effect of slowing the transition down because Autoradio cannot sign the broadcast contract until the case has been resolved. Until then, Klubrádió can broadcast upon temporary licenses (because its original frequency expired in 2011 February) In advertisements aired on Klubrádió, the station said that it would continue broadcasting on the internet and other frequencies if it lose the Budapest frequency. Experiencing the political pressure and administrative measures against Klubrádió, even Secretary Hillary Clinton of the US found it important to identify Klubrádió with the freedom of press in Hungary, and the corresponding authorities of the EU condemned the actions against Klubrádió directed by the ruling right-wing party. Hungary's democratic regression is also causing alarm within the European Union and EU member states. The country's parliament recently passed constitutional amendments limiting the powers of the constitutional court in a move which observers believe will undermine democratic checks and balances, and enhance the authoritarian drift under Orbán.

If Klubrádió had offered HUF 8 million more per year, it would have won the 95,3 frequency. Klubrádió previously had to collect more than HUF 120 million from donations through a fundraising campaign in order to maintain its running; at the same time, advertisers either withdrew or refused putting ads on a so-called liberal Klubrádió for fearing of the political consequences that were apparent after the latest elections. Meanwhile, Klubrádió lost its frequencies and licenses in countryside. If Autoradio cannot pay the amount it offered to pay, or the signing of the contract with this company fails for any reason, the frequency will go to the second placed participant, Klubrádió. After press attacks on Autoradio, the winner of the tender intensified, the firm announced a plan to a sell the frequency, and that they started talks with several radio companies including Klubrádió. Autoradio is reportedly asking HUF 200 million for the frequency enabling Klubrádió to continue owning the frequency regardless of the court case if it raises the money. The so-called Klub-rule (Klubszabály) is a newly implemented rule administered by the Media authority, to exclude the Klubrádió from the tender by observing that the applicant did not undersign the left-hand empty pages of the application.

== 2013: Klubrádió Wins ==
After the fourth court ruling, a grass-roots campaign by thousands of listeners and mounting international pressure — the media council finally backed down and awarded Klubrádió the long-term frequency in March 2013. In June 2016, an appeals court awarded the station almost $400,000 in compensation.

== 2021 license expiration ==
According to AP, the independent station "has been in the crosshairs of Prime Minister Viktor Orbán’s government since his return to power in 2010". A decade later, in September 2020, with the station's license coming up for renewal, the administration said it would not renew the multi-year license, claiming repeated "legal violations", and would auction off the frequency. The station lost its broadcast frequency as of February 2021, and continued as an internet-only broadcast. CNN at the time characterized Klubrádió as "one of Hungary's last independent radio stations" said that its removal was "widely seen as a blow against media freedom".

On 26 February 2026, after the European Commission initiated a procedure against Hungary, the Court of Justice of the European Union (CJEU) ruled that the country violated European law by taking Klubrádió off the air. According to the Court, Hungary acted against freedom of speech and freedom of information protected by the Charter of Fundamental Rights of the European Union.

== Notable staff ==
- András Arató owner
- Gábor Kuncze host, SZDSZ politician, former party leader, former minister of the interior, 1994–1998
- György Bolgár host, former US correspondent for the Hungarian Public Service Radio, 1988–1992
- Sándor Friderikusz television anchorman
- József Orosz host between 2001 and 2010, then he emigrated to Canada
- László Kéri former university professor, and consultant to Viktor Orbán
- György Kolláth lawyer
- Katalin Lévai former Socialist politician
- Tamás Ungvári university professor, writer and literature historian
- Ferenc Vicsek
