= Cellum =

Telecommunications company in Hungry

Cellum Group
- Formerly: Enigma Software Rt.
- Company type: Private
- Industry: IT services; Mobile commerce; Mobile payment
- Founded: September 13, 2000; 25 years ago in Budaörs, Hungary
- Founder: Balázs Inotay
- Headquarters: Hungary
- Area served: worldwide
- Key people: János Kóka (Chairman and CEO)
- Products: Cellum Mobile Next; Cellum Plug&Pay

Cellum Group (often abbreviated to Cellum) is an international provider of mobile transaction solutions, including mobile payments and mobile commerce. The company is headquartered in Hungary, Europe, with several subsidiaries and affiliates around the world, including Austria, Bulgaria, Singapore and the United States.

== History and overview ==
Cellum is a corporate group that comprises several privately held companies. The first company was founded in 2000 by Balázs Inotay under the name Enigma Software Inc. and focused on developing SIM-based cryptography and digital signature technology. The company was renamed to Cellum Innovations and Services Inc. and was moved under the Netherlands-based holding company Cellum BV, with a view to international expansion. A new company called Mobile Payment Provider Inc. was set up for operating the company group's infrastructure. At the same time, Cellum shifted its focus to providing mobile banking and carrier billing solutions to the market-leading mobile carriers in Hungary.

In 2010, former Minister of Economy and Transport Dr. János Kóka joined Cellum first as an advisor, and then in 2011 he became CEO of the newly created Cellum Global Inc. affiliate, focusing on bringing Cellum's technologies to international markets. That same year, to support this expansion, Cellum Global received a EUR 1.5 million capital injection from PortfoLion, the venture fund of OTP Bank, at the time representing the largest such investment in Central Europe.

On January 30, 2018, Cellum announced that Indonesia's partly state-owned telecommunications company Telkom Indonesia, through its PT MetraNet subsidiary, was making an investment in the company in two phases, eventually acquiring a 30.4% stake. Though the scale of the capital injection was not disclosed at the time, citing capital market rules, it was later reported by Indonesian press that the total value of the transaction was USD 6 million.

== Products and services ==
Cellum provides a wide range of mobile transaction services based on various technologies. The main focus of the company is remote mobile payments, with several implementations of cloud-based mobile wallets, as well as carrier billing and closed-loop payments via NFC cards.

=== Cellum Mobile Next ===
Cellum's core product is Cellum Mobile Next, a transaction platform for remote mobile payments. It serves as the technological foundation of the company's mobile wallet services. Cellum Mobile Next is built on the IBM Flex System.

=== Mobile wallets ===
Cellum provides its mobile wallet technology in a Software as a Service model for white-label implementation. So far, the company has announced 7 such implementations:

- MasterCard Mobile was introduced in Hungary in 2011 as a joint effort of MasterCard, Telenor Hungary, Magyar Telekom and FHB Mortgage Bank
- CellumPay was launched in Bulgaria in 2012 in cooperation with local mobile carrier Vivacom
- Erste MobilePay was launched in Hungary in 2014 under the brand of Erste Bank
- OTPay was launched in Hungary in 2014 under the brand of OTP Bank
- Mobile Credit Card was launched in Thailand in 2014 under the brand of PaysBuy, a Telenor subsidiary
- Telenor Wallet was launched in Hungary in 2014 under the brand of Telenor Hungary, a Telenor subsidiary
- ECPay is to be launched in Indonesia under the brand of Evercoss, a local device manufacturer

=== Software Development Kit ===
In February 2015, Cellum announced it was opening up its platform to third parties through a partner program called Cellum Plug & Pay. The SDK available within the program supports iOS and Android. As of November 2015, the program is still in limited launch phase.

=== Contactless payments ===
While the company's main focus is remote payments, Cellum has also developed and deployed NFC-based payment systems.
