= István Szent-Iványi =

Hungarian politician

István Szent-Iványi MEP
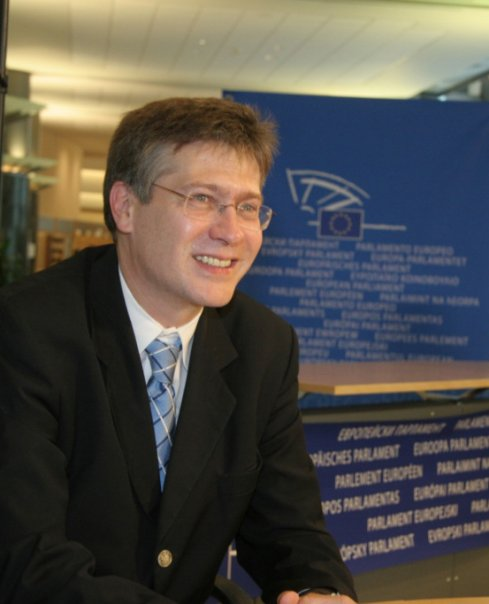

Member of the European Parliament
- In office 1 May 2004 – 13 July 2009
- Constituency: Hungary

Personal details
- Born: 12 November 1958 (age 67) Kecskemét, Hungary
- Party: Hungary; Alliance of Free Democrats; Hungarian Liberal Party; New World People's Party; EU; European Liberal Democrat and Reform Party
- Spouse: Veress Dorottya
- Children: Szent-Iványi Klára, Szent-Iványi Ágnes, Szent-Iványi Domokos

István Szent-Iványi (born 12 November 1958, Kecskemét, Hungary) is a Hungarian politician, Hungarian Ambassador to Slovenia, founding member of the Alliance of Free Democrats political party, and former Member of the European Parliament (MEP) for the Alliance of Free Democrats, part of the European Liberal Democrat and Reform Party. Szent-Iványi has been chief foreign policy advisor to the Hungarian Liberal Party between October 2015 and April 2018. Since 2021, Szent-Iványi is the foreign-political advisor of the UVNP.

== Career ==
He was full member of the Committee on Foreign Affairs and vice-chairman of the Delegation for Relations with the Korean Peninsula. Previously, he served four terms as MP in the Hungarian National Assembly (1990-2004) being chairman of the Committee on Foreign Affairs (1997-2002) and the Committee on European Integration (2002–04).

He is founding member of the Alliance of Free Democrats (1988), was twice its Group leader in the National Assembly (1997-1998, 2000–2002), and he has been for years a member of its executive board. He was Secretary of State (deputy minister) at the Ministry of Foreign Affairs from 1994 to 1997. He was elected to the European Parliament in June 2004 and served as an MEP until 2009 and was head of the Hungarian liberal delegation and member of the Bureau of the Alliance of Liberals and Democrats for Europe political group in the European Parliament.

He has been a member of the AFET and BUDG Committee and vice-chair of the Korea Peninsula Delegation. Since September 2009 he is vice-president of the Hungarian Atlantic Council. He joined the MFA of Hungary in 2009 and from January 2010 until January 2015 served as the Ambassador of Hungary to Slovenia. He has been awarded with the Commemorative Medal of 13 January for his courage and dedication to defending Lithuania's freedom and independence in 1992. He published a book titled Quo vadis Hungaria ? on the Hungarian foreign policy in 2018

In 2021 he joined the liberal conservative New World People's Party.

== Personal life ==
He married Marianne Csáky in 1984.
