= Anett Bősz =

Hungarian politician

Anett Bősz MP
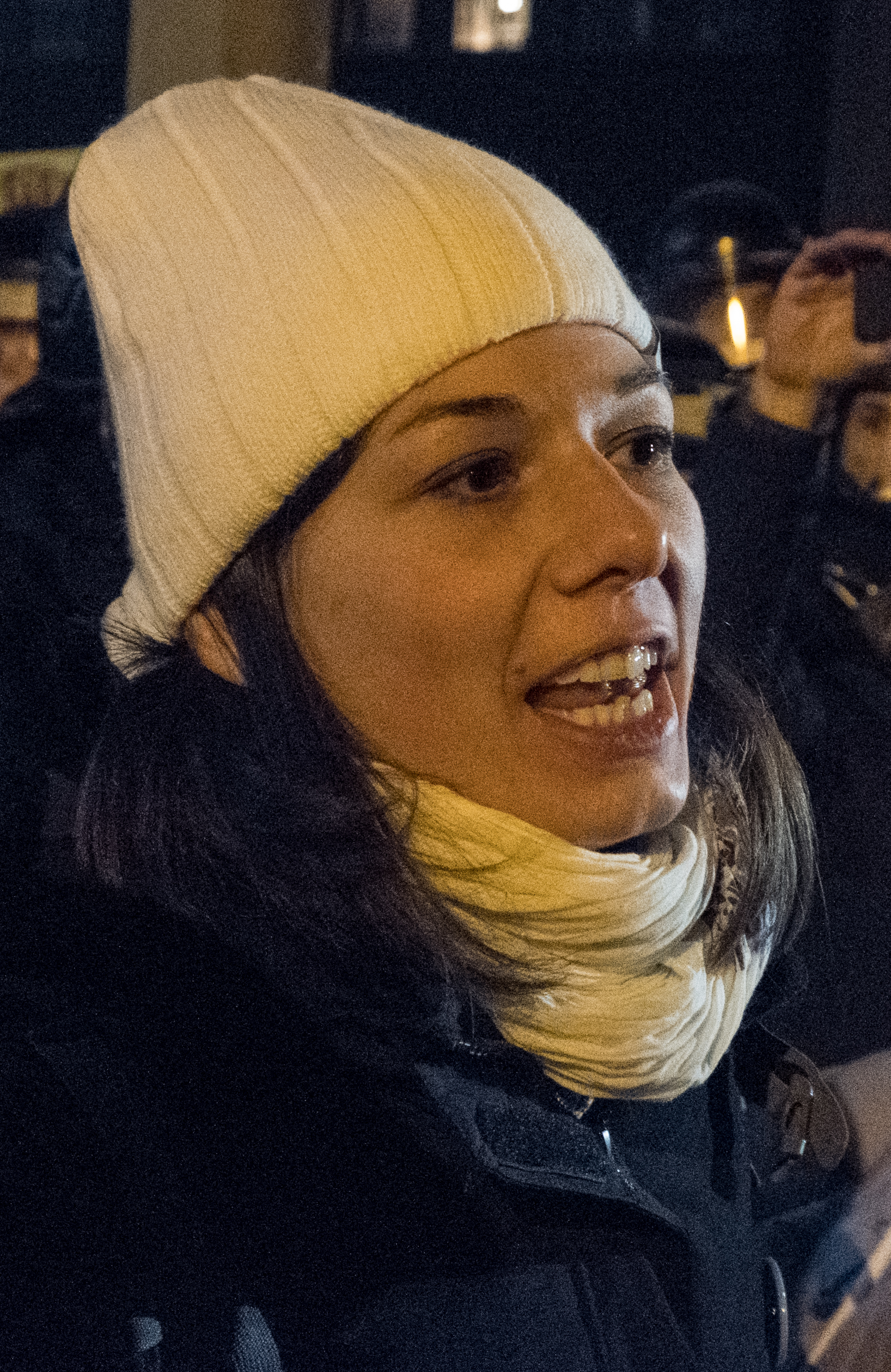
- Bősz in 2018

Leader of the Hungarian Liberal Party
- In office 2 December 2019 – 30 September 2024
- Preceded by: Gábor Fodor

Personal details
- Born: 16 December 1986 (age 39) Budapest, Hungary
- Party: Liberals
- Education: Corvinus University (MSc)

Anett Bősz (born 18 December 1986) is a Hungarian liberal politician. Since November 2019, she has been the Leader of the Hungarian Liberal Party. She is a Member of Parliament since 2018.

== Education ==
After graduating from the Alternative School of Economics, she graduated from Faculty of Economics of the Corvinus University in Budapest, 2011, with a degree in International Economics. In the meantime, she led the faculty's Student Self-Government for a year, in 2008, where, following the termination of her presidency, she became an external associate of the organization dealing with marketing communications and journalism. In 2010, she was awarded a scholarship by the Free University of Berlin, where she expanded her knowledge of international relations, human rights, diplomacy and European integration as a student at the Institute for Political Science. She is currently a doctoral student at the Faculty of Economics of the Corvinus University of Budapest.

== Political career ==
In 2009 she took part in the press department of TV2, the largest national commercial TV channel, for a year. After her state exam, she worked for a British event management company in Berlin. After three years in the German capital, she became a founding member of the Hungarian Liberal Party in 2013 and a year later, she became the founder and first leader of the party's youth organization, the Young Liberals.

Bősz has won her seat from the national list of MSZP–P in the 2018 parliamentary elections, under a cooperation agreement with the Hungarian Liberal Party. She was appointed a vice-chairperson of the Economic Committee. Ten days after the inaugural meeting of the new national assembly, Anett Bősz left the Dialogue faction on 18 May 2018. It was revealed that Socialist party chairman Gyula Molnár, prime minister-candidate Gergely Karácsony and Liberal party chairman Gábor Fodor agreed before the election that the MSZP would allocate 60 million HUF annually to MLP from its own state budget, unless the party started separately. However, the MSZP party leadership did not know about this and the party did not consent to it, which also raised suspicions of illicit party support. Bősz's withdrawal reduced the faction's membership to less than five, which would have resulted in its dissolution. However, Tamás Mellár, an independent Member of Parliament, joined the Dialogue faction on 20 May. Bősz was an independent MP from May 2018 to December 2019. She was appointed to the Committee on Budgets.

Bősz was elected leader of the Liberal Party on 2 December 2019, succeeding Gábor Fodor. On 9 December 2019, she announced that she would join the DK parliamentary faction. Under her presidency, MLP gradually became a de facto satellite party of the Democratic Coalition (DK). She ran on the 2021 Hungarian opposition primary as a candidate of the Democratic Coalition, with the support of the Everybody's Hungary Movement in Érd constituency. She acquired 60 percent of the vote, becoming candidate of the joint opposition alliance United for Hungary for the 2022 Hungarian parliamentary election. Bősz was defeated by the candidate of Fidesz András Aradszki in the 2022 election, leaving the Liberal Party without parliamentary representation after eight years. Succeeding Erzsébet Gy. Németh, who became a Member of Parliament, the Democratic Coalition nominated Anett Bősz as Deputy Mayor of Budapest for Human Policies in May 2022. On 30 September 2024, Bősz announced that she would retire from politics with the termination of her position as Deputy Mayor.
