= Gábor Fodor (politician) =

Hungarian jurist and politician

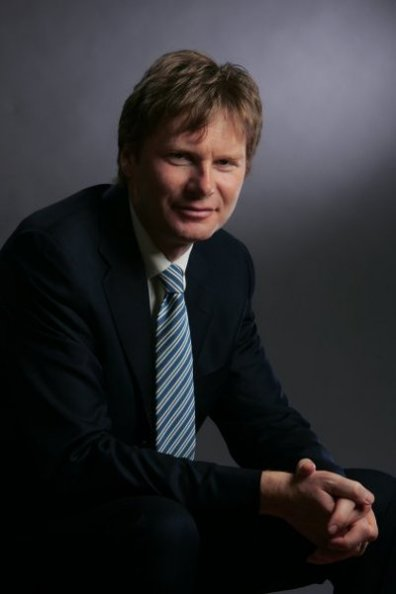

9th president of the Alliance of Free Democrats
- In office 7 June 2008 – 12 July 2009
- Preceded by: János Kóka
- Succeeded by: Attila Retkes

Minister of Environment and Water of Hungary
- In office 7 May 2007 – 30 April 2008
- Prime Minister: Ferenc Gyurcsány
- Preceded by: Miklós Persányi
- Succeeded by: Imre Szabó

Minister of Education of Hungary
- In office 15 July 1994 – 1 January 1996
- President: Árpád Göncz
- Prime Minister: Gyula Horn
- Preceded by: Ferenc Mádl
- Succeeded by: Bálint Magyar

Personal details
- Born: 27 September 1962 (age 63) Gyöngyös, People's Republic of Hungary
- Other political affiliations: Fidesz (1988–1993); SZDSZ (1994–2010); Hungarian Liberal Party(2013–2019)
- Profession: jurist, politician

Gábor Fodor (born 27 September 1962) is a Hungarian jurist, former liberal politician and a delegate to the Hungarian Round Table Talks. He was member of the Hungarian parliament from 1990 to 2019. Later he was the representative of the Hungarian parliament in the Council of Europe between 1991 and 1993. From 1994 to 1996 he was the Minister of Education in Hungary. Furthermore, he was the Minister of Environment and Water between 2008 and 2009. He is also a former president of the Alliance of Free Democrats (SZDSZ) in 2008–09 and for the Liberals in 2013–19 as well. Currently he is the CEO and founder of the Central European Political Transition Institute.

== Family background ==
He was born on 27 September 1962 into an intellectual family in Gyöngyös. His father's name is Árpád Fodor (1926–2012) who was a judge and later an attorney at law. His mother's name is Klára Révfalvi (1925–2017) and she was working in the local city council. Gábor has one older brother.

== Early life ==
He went to elementary school and high school in the town of Gyöngyös. He took his final exams at Berze Nagy János Grammar School in 1981. He continued his studies at the Faculty of Law of the Eötvös Loránd University and graduated in 1987. He was a member of the Bibó István College for Advanced Studies, along with Viktor Orbán, Tamás Deutsch and László Kövér.

== Political career ==
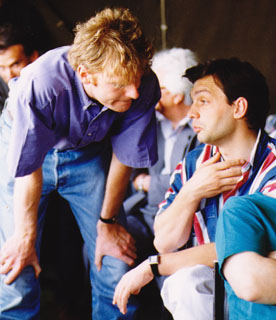
Viktor Orbán and Gábor Fodor at the Szárszó meeting of 1993

=== Fidesz ===
He was a founding member of the Fidesz but left the party in 1993, due to his opposition to Viktor Orbán's nationalist approach.

=== SZDSZ ===
Fodor joined the liberal Alliance of Free Democrats (SZDSZ) in 1993. The party cooperated with the Hungarian Socialist Party, which successfully defeated Fidesz in 1994, 2002 and 2006. He was Minister of Education between 1994 and 1995 and Minister of Environmental Protection and Water between 2007 and 2008.

Fodor resigned after the results of the 2009 European Parliament election. He was elected in an internal SZDSZ election to the post of party leader in June 2008 with 346 votes to 344. This was an unscheduled election prompted by problems around the verification of the result of the previous vote.

=== Hungarian Liberal Party ===
On 27 April 2013, he announced the formation of a new party called the Hungarian Liberal Party (Liberals). Fodor tried to recruit young talents with no political background (For instance: Anett Bősz, Ádám Sermer) to the party. He also strengthened the party with well-known and experienced actors in public life (Zoltán Bodnár, István Szent-Iványi). Their program was named as Compassionate Liberalism. The party won seats during the 2014 and 2018 parliamentary elections in Hungary. On 27 August 2019, he announced his resignation as party chairman and also quit the party. According to his statements, he did not want to take part in the unification of the opposition, which was unfolding at that time.

== Private life ==
His first wife (between 1988 and 1993) was Ágnes Honecz jurist, art historian and later the CEO of the Equal Treatment Authority (in Hungarian: Egyenlő Bánásmód Hatóság). His second wife was Barbara Czeizel between 1995 and 2018. They have a daughter Júlia Rebeka (born 2000) and a son Jakab Dániel (born 1995).

Political offices
Preceded by Ferenc Mádl	Minister of Education; 1994–1995	Succeeded by Bálint Magyar
Preceded by Miklós Persányi	Minister of Environment and Water; 2007–2008	Succeeded by Imre Szabó
Party political offices
Preceded by János Kóka	President of the Alliance of Free Democrats; 2008–2009	Succeeded by Attila Retkes
