= Mátyás Eörsi =

Hungarian politician

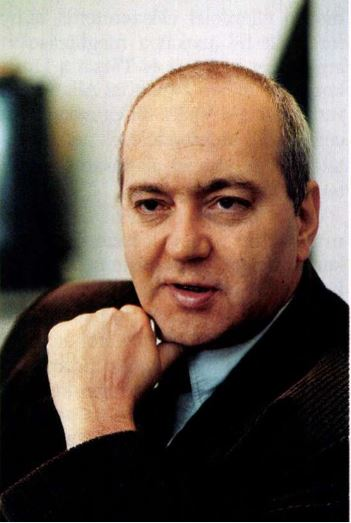
- Mátyás Eörsi in 2005

Leader of the ALDE-PACE group in the Council of Europe
- In office 2001–2009

Personal details
- Born: 24 November 1954 (age 71) Budapest, Hungary
- Party: SZDSZ, DK
- Spouse: Katalin Jemnitz
- Children: 3
- Education: Eötvös Loránd University
- Website: http://www.eorsiforcoe.info/

Mátyás Eörsi (born 24 November 1954) is a Hungarian politician who was the leader of the liberal Alliance of Liberals and Democrats for Europe in the Parliamentary Assembly of the Council of Europe (ALDE-PACE) Group in the Parliamentary Assembly of the Council of Europe (PACE). He became a member of the PACE in 1994. On 6 March 2009 the Hungarian government nominated Eörsi to Secretary General of the Council of Europe.

Eörsi studied law in Budapest and was elected to parliament in 1990. He was an MP until 2010. In 1997 he was appointed Political State Secretary at the Ministry of Foreign Affairs for a period of almost two years. In parliament, he served as Chairperson of the Foreign Affairs Committee, Chairperson of the European Affairs Committee, and he was leader of the Parliamentary Group of the party, SZDSZ as well.

== Personal background and professional life ==
Eörsi was born in Budapest. His grandmother, Ernőné Hajdu Fanni, Auer was a Social democrat member of parliament in 1945-1948. She was arrested and tortured by the Ferenc Szálasi regime in the final months of the war. As a committed democrat, she was one of the 350,000 people purged by the Rákosi regime from 1946 onwards.

She was jailed and tortured again. Oddly, the woman who tortured her was the same during both regimes. His father, Gyula Eörsi was a law professor, an author of several books and a major contributor to UN Convention on Contracts for the International Sale of Goods. His mother, Marianna Eörsi was a teacher of Hungarian literature and grammar at high schools. He is a nephew of the Hungarian author and former dissident István Eörsi.

=== Education ===
Mátyás Eörsi was educated at the Kossuth Zsuzsa High School in Budapest. He was admitted to the Law Faculty of the Eötvös Loránd University in Budapest, where he graduated in 1979.

=== Employment ===
Eörsi's started his career as in house legal counsel to a Hungarian state company "KOMPLEX Export-Import" in international trading. In 1987 he established his own law firm, Eörsi & Partners which he ran as managing partner until he became an MP.

The firm, one of the first private law firms in Hungary, was among others specialized in commercial law and soon became one of the leading Budapest law firms. Although Mátyás Eörsi was a full-time politician now, he is still active as an arbitrator at the Arbitration Court attached to the Hungarian Chamber of Industry and Trade.

Since he did not contest the national election in 2010, Eörsi was working for NDI in Jordan and in Libya, for the Democracy Reporting International in Berlin, for the Parliamentary Forum for Democracy in Vilnius. From 2015 until 2017 Eörsi was the senior advisor to the Secretary General and the Head of Admin, Finances and HR at the Community of Democracies in Warsaw.

Eörsi was Head of the Election Observation Missions of OSCE/ODIHR in 2017 in the Czech Republic and in 2019 in the Republic of Moldova.

Currently he works for Vice-President Klára Dobrev in the European Parliament as senior political advisor.

== Political biography ==
Founding member of SZDSZ (The Hungarian Liberal Party) in 1989.

He was elected as MP to the Hungarian National Assembly in 1990.

Chairperson of the Foreign Affairs Committee (1994-1997)

Member, Parliamentary Assembly of the Council of Europe (1994-1997,1998-2010)

State Secretary, Ministry of Foreign Affairs (1997-1998)

Vice-president, Liberal International (2001-2006)

Leader, ALDE Group Parliamentary Assembly of the Council of Europe (2002-2009)

Bureau Member, ELDR Party (2002-2009)

Chairperson, European Affairs Committee (2004-2010)

Floor leader of SZDSZ parliamentary group (2007-2008)

He joined Democratic Coalition in January 2012.

Member of National Council – Democratic Coalition Party, Hungary (2012-)

Senior Foreign Policy Advisor to the President of the Democratic Coalition Party (2016- )

Senior Political Advisor to Klára DOBREV, Vice-President in the European Parliament.

=== Foreign policy, political state secretary ===
In 1994 Mátyás Eörsi became President of the Foreign Affairs Committee of the Hungarian Parliament and in 1997 he was appointed Political State Secretary (First Deputy Foreign Minister) at the Ministry of Foreign Affairs. After Hungary's entry into the European Union (2004), Eörsi became the President of the Committee for European Affairs, a position he held for two consecutive term, until 2010, when he was not contesting the national elections.

=== International work, Council of Europe ===
Late 2009/early 2010 Eörsi lead the PACE observers-mission during the 2010 Ukrainian presidential elections.

In 1997 Mr. Eörsi was elected as vice-president at Liberal International, and he also served in the Bureau of ELDR Party between 2002 and 2009.

Eörsi is a supporter of the Campaign for the Establishment of a United Nations Parliamentary Assembly, an organisation which advocates for democratic reformation of the United Nations.

== Personal life ==
His wife, Katalin Jemnitz is a biologist at the Chemical Research Centre of the Hungarian Academy of Sciences. They have a daughter, Júlia and two sons, Márton and Péter.
