= United for Hungary =

Political alliance in Hungary

United for Hungary Egységben Magyarországért
- Leader: Péter Márki-Zay (Note: Winner of the 2021 opposition primary, candidate for Prime Minister in the 2022 election.)
- Founded: 20 December 2020
- Dissolved: 3 April 2022
- Preceded by: Unity
- Succeeded by: DK–MSZP–Dialogue
- Ideology: Anti-Orbanism; Liberal democracy Pro-Europeanism
- Political position: Big tent
- Colors: Turquoise; White; Blue
- Slogan: Legyen Magyarország mindannyiunké! ('Let Hungary belong to us all!')

Website
- egysegbenmagyarorszagert.hu

United for Hungary (Note: Previously known as the United Opposition.) (Hungarian: Egységben Magyarországért [ˈɛcʃeːɡbɛn ˈmɒɟɒrorsaːɡeːrt]) was a big tent political alliance in Hungary that was formed to compete in the 2022 parliamentary election. The alliance lost the 2022 election, and dissolved shortly after. The parties that composed the alliance ranged from centre-left to centre-right.

== History ==
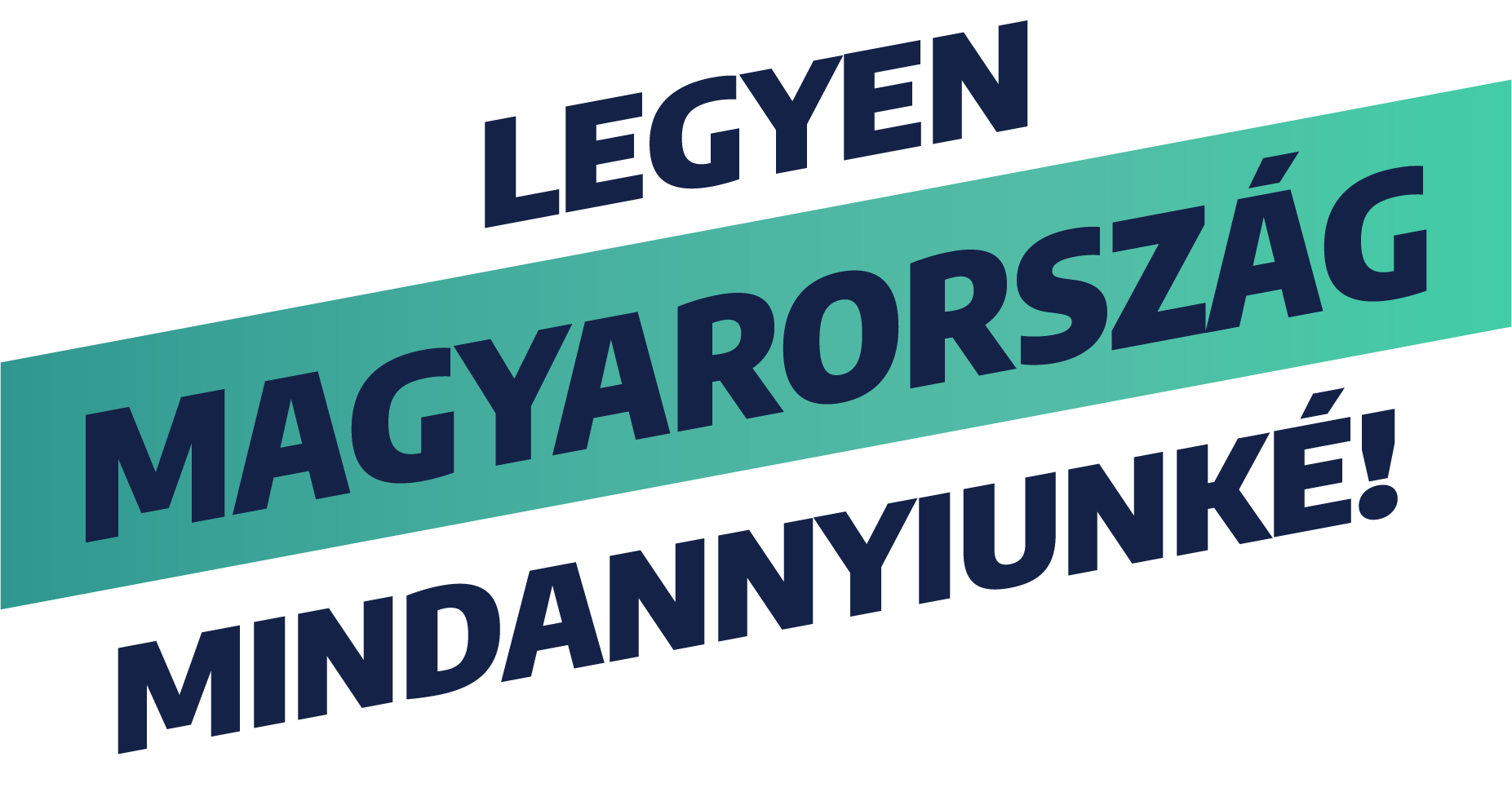
Slogan of the coalition

=== Motivations for collaboration ===
The motivation for opposition cooperation was deemed by some to stem from the characteristics of the latest electoral system, the diversity of opposition parties, and the game-theoretic characteristics of human behavior:

1. a single round, plurality voting system introduced in 2011 delegates the most supported district candidate to parliament, even if his or her support is actually below 50%, only the other candidates received even less support individually. This is identical in the United Kingdom, however in Hungary, the electoral system was adopted and therefore districts were created solely by the ruling parties, and many consider the districts to be gerrymandered in their favour.
2. due to the unity of the right-wing ruling parties (Fidesz–KDNP) and the multiplicity of opposition parties, and without opposition coordination, the last voters have been naturally divided among their parties for years, so that their voting power has mostly not reached the one-sided right-wing community.
3. opposition parties face the tragedy of the commons known from game theory, because if they pursue their selfish interests alone, they are more likely to get into parliament and stay afloat, although they cannot form a government, and their cooperation is hampered by the fact that "a selfish player in this game his behavior naturally entails similar behavior by others":
  - "Under the current rules, if a single party lists, it must reach 5% to get in, if two, 10%, if more, 15%." – it encourages selfishness, as there is a greater risk to not reaching the higher threshold
  - "a political group could henceforth be formed only by members of the same party who had drawn up a national list and obtained a mandate in the previous election" – this is a condition for remaining afloat
  - out of 106 "candidates must be nominated in 27 SMDs (since increase to 71) in order for the nominating organization to have a national list" – but the district votes are shattered if more opposition candidates enter in one district
  - vote for losing candidates are transferred to the list tier (although with inherently less weight), thereby encouraging every party to run a candidate in every SMD if they run separately, unless any agreements to tactically withdraw prove more beneficial

According to Tibor Závecz, managing director of Závecz Research, the support data and the willingness of the opposition side to vote show that there can even be close competition between Fidesz and the opposition, which has been cooperating much more closely than before. Fidesz has a huge advantage on the party list, but it can be a potential challenger in the unifying opposition. According to a July 2020 poll, 87% of opposition voters supported the common candidate, 83% also supported the common list.

=== Foundation and Purpose of the Alliance ===
The founder parties of the alliance at its formation were the Hungarian Socialist Party, Democratic Coalition, Jobbik, LMP – Hungary's Green Party, Dialogue for Hungary and the Momentum Movement. Other associate parties and organizations were the ÚVNP, the Hungarian Liberal Party, the New Start, the Everybody's Hungary Movement, the 99 Movement and the Spark Movement, however, their candidates had to join one of the 6 main parties' parliamentary groups if they win a seat.

The alliance's aim is to nominate one candidate against the Fidesz–KDNP candidate in each of the 106 individual constituencies and, in the event of a victory, to co-govern on the basis of a commonly agreed programme and principles.

Opposition parties are not expected to merge completely, as the goal is not to eliminate differences, but to function if they want not only a change of government, but "to create a lasting livable Hungary where differences can be discussed and managed".

=== Controversies within the party alliance ===
Closer cooperation through the alliance, but much debate is also expected between the parties. A joint program can be created through close cooperation between the expert staffs, the background institutions and the party foundations operating them, which requires the coordination of financial resources and communication activities.

Serious debates were expected on the selection of the 106 individual candidates, the issue of joint or separate lists, and the manner in which the joint prime ministerial candidate would be selected. The alliance was born of several ideas; some parties supported full cooperation, but Péter Jakab, president of Jobbik, spoke of two types of lists, namely an MSZP-DK-Dialogue and a Jobbik-Momentum-LMP list. Jakab said he needed two lists because he said not many people in rural villages would vote for politicians ruling before 2010. A joint decision on this issue was expected by the end of 2020. According to a July 2020 survey, only 5 percent wanted more lists, the rest uncertain. Common candidates were supported regardless of party preference, with differences in sympathizers from each party in the common list: 80 and 81 percent of DK and Momentum voters would support "only" it (4 and 7 percent, respectively, strongly oppose it), while 88-91 percent of the rate. In his view, that one list would be psychologically better for the opposition. However, according to an analyst at Political Capital, anti-Orbán voters could be better mobilized if they had at least one tiny choice and could choose at least the most attractive party groupings.

=== Primary elections ===
The party presidents agreed to set up a joint programme in the interests of the country and considered the institution of primary elections to be a legitimate tool for the selection of individual candidates in addition to the negotiated path. Not only individual joint candidates were decided by primary, but also the person of the joint prime ministerial candidate.

The opposition primary was held between 18 and 28 September 2021 (first round) and 10–16 October 2021 (second round), it was the first countrywide primary election in the political history of Hungary. 106 local candidates were elected to be the joint candidates of the participating opposition parties.

Non-partisan candidate Péter Márki-Zay was elected as prime ministerial candidate of the united opposition.

=== Selection of list candidates ===
Some participating parties, including MSZP, LMP, Momentum and Dialogue for Hungary have already put forward a list of their preferred candidates for the joint list prior to the full list of candidates for the joint list of United for Hungary being announced.

=== 2022 election results ===
United for Hungary lost the 2022 elections.

Some analysts claimed that the majority of Jobbik voters turned out for Fidesz or Mi Hazánk instead of the united opposition. Márki-Zay shared this assessment, admitting that the united opposition may have lost up to "two thirds" of Jobbik voters. Other opposition leaders could not immediately agree on how to assess their defeat.

DK leader Ferenc Gyurcsány and Jobbik leader Péter Jakab blamed Márky-Zay, while Bernadett Szél and Ákos Hadházy did not. Péter Ungár claimed that while it was a "strategic mistake" for a center-left alliance to nominate the conservative Márky-Zay, the united opposition's "elitist" rhetoric may have hurt it with rural voters even in traditionally left-leaning constituencies.

== Composition ==
United for Hungary was composed of the following political parties and organisations:

=== Main parties ===
Party	Abbr.	Main ideology	Leader(s)
Democratic Coalition	DK	Social liberalism	Ferenc Gyurcsány
Jobbik	Jobbik	Conservatism	Péter Jakab
Momentum Movement	MM	Liberalism	András Fekete-Győr (until 2021); Anna Orosz (2021) (Note: acting); Anna Donáth (since 2021)
Hungarian Socialist Party	MSZP	Social democracy	Bertalan Tóth; Ágnes Kunhalmi
LMP – Hungary's Green Party	LMP	Green liberalism	Máté Kanász-Nagy; Erzsébet Schmuck
Dialogue – The Greens' Party	PM	Green politics	Gergely Karácsony; Tímea Szabó

=== Associate parties ===
Party	Abbr.	Main ideology	Leader(s)
Hungarian Liberal Party	MLP	Liberalism	Anett Bősz
New Start	UK	Conservative liberalism	Krisztina Hohn
New World People's Party	ÚVNP	Liberal conservatism	József Pálinkás

=== Organizations ===
Organisation	Abbr.	Ideology	Leader
Everybody's Hungary Movement	MMM	Liberal conservatism	Péter Márki-Zay
99 Movement	99M	Progressivism	Gergely Karácsony (Note: Karácsony was the co-leader of Dialogue, the movement was founded to support his candidacy for Prime Minister in 2021.)
Spark Movement	Szikra	Democratic socialism, Green politics	Collective leadership

== Election results ==
=== National Assembly ===
Election	Leader	Constituency		Party list		Seats	+/–	Status
Election	Leader	Votes	%	Votes	%	Seats	+/–	Status
2022	Péter Márki-Zay	1,983,708	36.90 (#2)	1,947,331	34.44 (#2)	57 / 199	New	Opposition

== See also ==
- 2022 Hungarian parliamentary election
- Unity (2014)
- DK–MSZP–Dialogue Alliance (2024)
