= János Kóka =

Businessman and Former Minister of Economy and Transport of Hungary

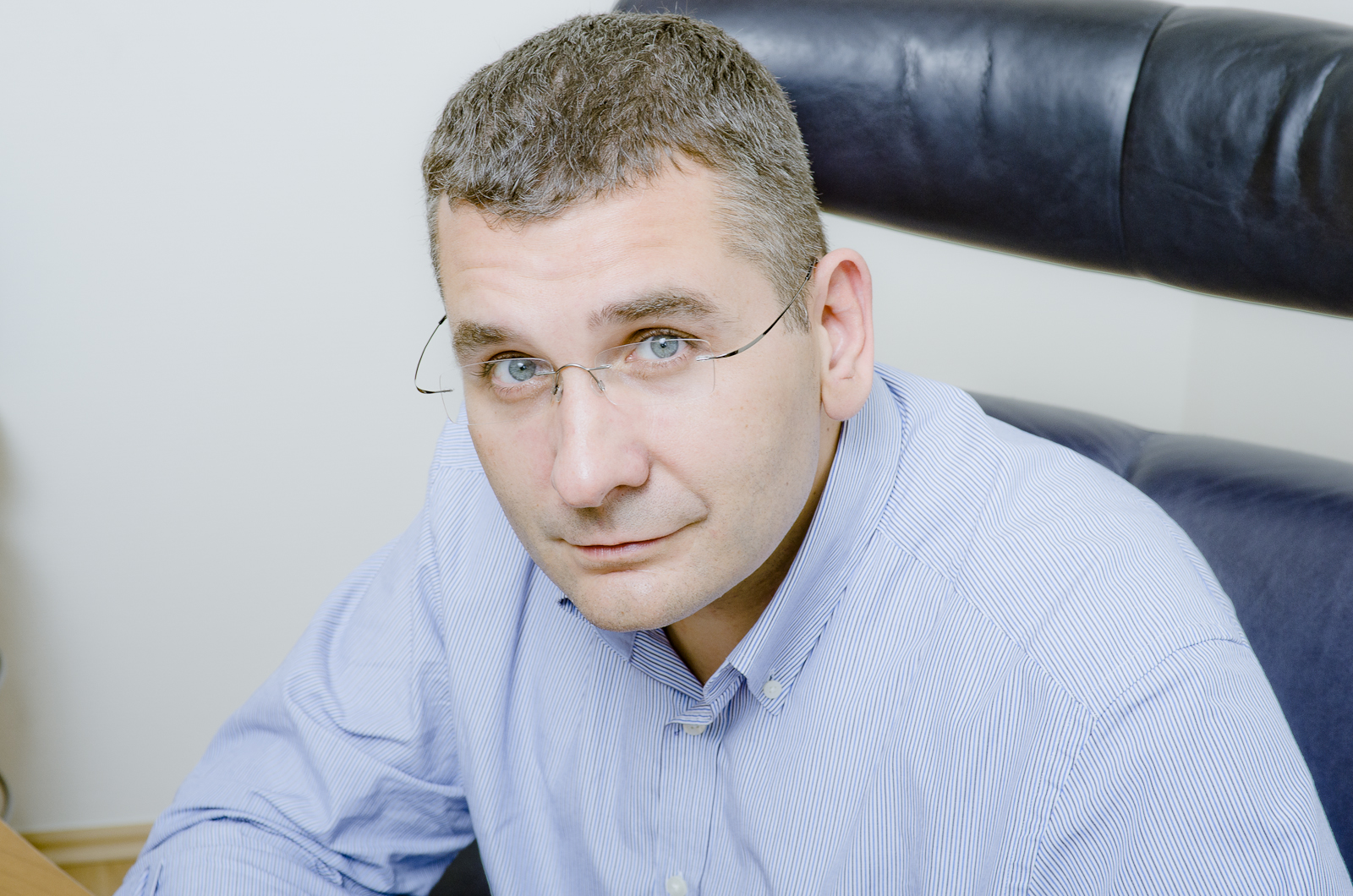
- Dr. János Kóka as Chairman and CEO of Cellum Global Zrt. (2013)

Minister of Economy and Transport
- In office 4 October 2004 – 3 December 2007
- Preceded by: István Csillag
- Succeeded by: Csaba Kákosy

Personal details
- Born: 5 July 1972 (age 54) Budapest, Hungary
- Party: SZDSZ (2006–2010)
- Spouse: Edit Varga
- Children: 3
- Profession: manager, entrepreneur, former politician

János Kóka (born 5 July 1972) is a Hungarian businessman, investor, IT entrepreneur and manager of various enterprises, who was Minister of Economy and Transport between 2004 and 2007. He was a member of the Alliance of Free Democrats (SZDSZ) and functioned as its chairman from 2007 to 2008. He also was leader of the liberal party's parliamentary group until 2010, when SZDSZ failed to win any seats after 20 years. Kóka left the party that year. In 2010 he returned to business life and presently works as chairman and CEO of Cellum Global Zrt. and Chairman of the Board of Cellum Bulgaria. He is married to Edit Varga.

== Education ==
He graduated from Temesvári Pelbárt Franciscan Grammar School in Esztergom. He continued his studies at Semmelweis University of Medicine, where he received his degree in 1996.

== Business career ==
Kóka got involved in the emerging Hungarian IT industry while still at university, working as Project Manager and later Sales Director at one of Hungary's first Internet service providers, Elender LLC from 1994 and 1996. From 1996 he was Managing Director of Elender Computer LLC, then from 1998, following the company's transformation into a private limited company, as CEO of Elender IT, Inc. In 1999 Elender was acquired by PSINet, Inc. and Kóka became Country Manager, then from 2000 European Vice President of Business Development. He also became Chairman of the Board of Webigen Inc. in July 2000. He returned to his former company in October 2002, as CEO of Elender Business Communications. In 2004 he was appointed President of Euroweb Internet Service Provider Inc.

He was a board member of the ICT Association of Hungary (IVSZ) from 2000, and President from March 2003 until October 2004. From 2003 prior to his ministerial appointment he was Member of the Board of EICTA (European ICT Association) based in Brussels, and Chairman of the Hungarian-Indonesian Joint Business Council. In 2000 he received the ’IT Manager of the Year’ award founded by the ICT Association of Hungary.

== Political career ==
In October 2004, Kóka was appointed Minister of Economy and Transport, supported by SZDSZ, which he later became a member of in 2006. During this period his main tasks included the development of a business-friendly environment, stimulating the growth of the corporate sector, promoting a knowledge-based economy and increasing the international presence of domestic businesses. In June 2006 he was reappointed Minister of Economy and Transport. Between 2007-2008 he was President of the Liberal Party, and until 2010 as parliamentary group leader, member of the Budget Committee, and Chairman of the Nabucco Committee aiming to reduce the country's reliance on Russian gas.

His popularity began to drop in 2006 following the announcement of his Ministry's intention to shut down 14 regional lines of Hungarian State Railways on a total length of 474 km (295 mi). The government, referring to obligation under the constitution, ensured access to public transit in all settlements by installing bus routes and buses from Volán, which, in cases of single railway stations for multiple villages, meant stations in the centers or ends of every settlement. It was expected that this and an increased service frequency could theoretically be achieved while reducing spending on fuel (diesel or electricity) and maintenance. He considers the most important achievements of his ministerial activities to be the construction of 500 km of motorway, the influx of EUR 4-5 billion of operating capital annually into the country and the commencement of the construction of Megyeri Bridge.

On March 31, 2008, various reform-related disagreements between the Hungarian Socialist Party (MSZP) and SZDSZ led SZDSZ leader Kóka to announce that his party would quit the coalition by May 1, 2008. This also meant that MSZP would have to form the first minority government in Hungary since the political transition in 1990. However, the legitimacy of Kóka's position as party president became questioned when it was discovered that some signatures of the delegates to the assembly electing him had been forged. Since he had won his position by a very small margin over Gábor Fodor, these votes might have changed the outcome. Consequently, a new leadership election was held in June and Gábor Fodor was returned. In 2009, the parliamentary group he led ensured the majority of votes to elect Gordon Bajnai Prime Minister and facilitate the measures taken by the Bajnai Government. He did not run during the parliamentary elections in 2010 and he did not renew his party membership either.

== Post-political career ==
After leaving politics in 2010 Kóka returned to the business world. First he was involved in the reorganization of Cellum Group as a consultant, then in 2011 he was appointed chairman and CEO of Cellum Global Inc., established with the aim of international expansion.

As the representative of the company, in September 2011, he concluded a venture capital program agreement with Portfolion Zrt., member of OTP Bank Group, and soon afterwards he signed an agreement with Bulgaria's Corpbank on the establishment of a joint technological subsidiary. Since January 2012 he has been chairman of the Cellum Bulgaria subsidiary, with its head office in Bulgaria. He is a board member in MPP Zrt., also a Cellum Group affiliate. Under his management, the company has reported the conclusion of several international agreements of cooperation; for instance, Cellum developed the mobile payment application of MasterCard.

Political offices
Preceded by István Csillag	Minister of Economy and Transport; 2004–2007	Succeeded by Csaba Kákosy
Preceded by Lajos Molnár	Minister of Health; Acting; 2007	Succeeded by Ágnes Horváth
National Assembly of Hungary
Preceded by Mátyás Eörsi	Leader of the SZDSZ parliamentary group 2007–2010	Succeeded by Last
Party political offices
Preceded by Gábor Kuncze	President of the Alliance of Free Democrats; 2007–2008	Succeeded by Gábor Fodor
