= Hungarian Liberal Party =

Hungarian political party

Hungarian Liberal Party Magyar Liberális Párt
- Abbreviation: MLP
- Leader: none
- Founder: Gábor Fodor
- Founded: 27 April 2013
- Registered: 24 January 2014
- Headquarters: 1051 Budapest, Hercegprímás utca 18.
- Youth wing: LIFT – Federation of Liberal Youth
- Membership (2019): c. 100
- Ideology: Liberalism; Pro-Europeanism
- Political position: Centre to centre-left
- National affiliation: United for Hungary (2020–22)
- European affiliation: Alliance of Liberals and Democrats for Europe
- Colours: Deep sky blue
- National Assembly: 0 / 199 (0%)
- European Parliament: 0 / 21 (0%)
- County Assemblies: 0 / 381

Party flag

Website
- liberalisok.hu

Hungarian Liberal Party (Hungarian: Magyar Liberális Párt, pronounced [ˈmɒɟɒr ˈlibɛraːliʃ ˈpaːrt], shortened form Liberals (Liberálisok) or MLP) is a liberal political party in Hungary. The party was founded on 27 April 2013, founded by former Alliance of Free Democrats politician and minister Gábor Fodor. As part of opposition electoral alliances, MLP gained each one seat in 2014 and 2018 parliamentary elections. The party has been inactive following the 2022 parliamentary election.

== History ==
=== Foundation ===
Gábor Fodor announced in January 2013 that he intended to establish a new liberal party in Hungary. He presented his party in April 2013, promising "more liberal, person-centered and patriotic politics". Fodor is a former Minister of Education and a former member of Fidesz and of the Alliance of Free Democrats (SZDSZ). He criticized the state's tutelary policy and emphasized, Hungary was then in forefront of the region, when liberalism and the SZDSZ were strong. Fodor also introduced the party's programme with the title of "Sympathetic liberalism", breaking away from the "intellectual arrogance" of his previous party.

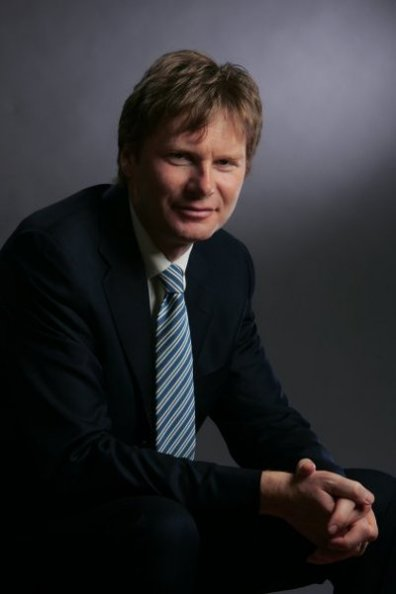
Gábor Fodor

In September 2013, the Hungarian Socialist Party (MSZP) declined to sign an election deal with the Democratic Coalition (DK) and the Hungarian Liberal Party because both parties presented excessive expectations compared to their social support. According to Fodor, the Liberals were ready to enter into a far-reaching compromise with left-leaning opposition parties in order to defeat Viktor Orbán. But after the Socialists and Together 2014 – the grouping led by former PM Gordon Bajnai – opted to stand apart, the Liberals had no other choice but to contest the 2014 parliamentary election on their own. Fodor attended as a public speaker at the opposition demonstration on the 1956 Revolution National Day, where he urged the establishment of a common democratic opposition list for the 2014 parliamentary election, criticizing agreement between the MSZP and Together 2014 and the exclusion of other opposition parties from the cooperation.

During the interim mayoral election in Fót, held on November 24, Liberal candidate Nóra Mária Vargha received 13 percent of the votes to come in fifth place. Fodor argued that this showed that liberals needed a party to call their own and that a lack of cooperation of opposition parties would only help the ruling Fidesz. Later, a Budapest court decided the annulment of election results because of a violation of campaign silence rules. On 20 December 2013, Századvég polls recorded support for the Hungarian Liberal Party for the first time, at about 1% of the vote.

=== Parliamentary presence ===
On 14 January 2014, the Hungarian Liberal Party joined the Unity electoral alliance of opposition parties, which was led by chairman of the MSZP Attila Mesterházy and contested the 2014 parliamentary elections. Fodor ran as a candidate for MP from the fourth place of the alliance's national list. The party also received two additional places (56th and 58th) on the list. Although Unity as a whole suffered a heavy defeat in the elections, Fodor became a Member of Parliament again after four years and did not join any parliamentary group.

On 19 November 2015, the party was admitted into the Alliance of Liberals and Democrats for Europe.

The Hungarian Liberal Party was the only political party to openly campaign in favour of the EU's compulsory migrant quota system and asked its supporters to vote "yes" in the October 2016 migrant quota referendum. The MLP's foreign policy advisor István Szent-Iványi said in August 2016 that the support of "yes" votes "is the only way to stand up for European values, Hungary’s belonging to Europe and European solidarity", criticizing the behaviour of left-wing parties that decided to boycott the referendum. Hungarian Liberal Party chairman Gábor Fodor (currently the party’s only MP) submitted a bill in 2017 calling for the legalization and regulation of cannabis in Hungary. In economic matters, the party supports flat tax.

=== Alliance with the Democratic Coalition ===
In the 2018 parliamentary election, Anett Bősz was elected to the National Assembly from the joint MSZP–P list. Under the agreement, she became a member of the Dialogue for Hungary (PM) parliamentary group. Ten days after the inaugural meeting of the new national assembly, Anett Bősz left the Dialogue faction on 18 May 2018. It was revealed that Socialist party chairman Gyula Molnár, prime minister-candidate Gergely Karácsony and Liberal party chairman Fodor agreed before the election that the MSZP would allocate 60 million HUF annually to MLP from its own state budget, unless the party started separately. However, the MSZP party leadership did not know about this and the party did not consent to it, which also raised suspicions of illicit party support. Bősz's withdrawal reduced the faction's membership to less than five, which would have resulted in its dissolution. However, Tamás Mellár, an independent Member of Parliament, joined the Dialogue faction on 20 May.

Bősz was an independent MP from May 2018 to December 2019. In August 2019, Fodor resigned the MLP's chairman position and Bősz was elected as his successor in December 2019. She joined the DK faction in the National Assembly in the same month. Under her presidency, the MLP gradually became a de facto satellite party of the Democratic Coalition. Its members, Bősz herself and Ádám Sermer ran under DK banner in both 2021 opposition primary and 2022 Hungarian parliamentary election. Only another member Viktor Szabadai announced his candidacy in Csorna constituency under MLP banner in the 2022 national election; if the party did not run in the election, the court would dissolve it under current law (since it did not run under its own banner in 2018 either). Szabadai asked opposition voters not to vote for him but to support the candidate of the United for Hungary, of which DK (and thus MLP) was a member. Both Bősz and Sermer were defeated by the candidates of Fidesz in their respective constituencies in the 2022 election, leaving the MLP without any parliamentary representation after eight years. Following the 2022 election, while MLP is a technically defunct party without any activity, its politicians are affiliated with the Democratic Coalition.

== Leadership ==
- Anett Bősz: chairman
- András Boruzs: party manager
- Viktor Szabadai: party chairman in Budapest
- István Szent-Iványi: foreign policy advisor

== History of leaders ==
	Image	Name	Entered office	Left office	Length of Leadership
1		Gábor Fodor	27 April 2013	26 August 2019	6 years, 3 months and 30 days
2		Anett Bősz	2 December 2019	30 September 2024	4 years, 9 months and 28 days

== Election results ==
=== National Assembly ===
Election	Leader	Constituency		Party list		Seats	+/–	Status
Election	Leader	Votes	%	Votes	%	Seats	+/–	Status
2014 (Note: Run within Unity coalition.)	Gábor Fodor	1,317,879	26.85% (#2)	1,290,806	25.57% (#2)	1 / 199	New	Opposition
2018 (Note: Run a candidate in MSZP-Párbeszéd list.)	Gábor Fodor	622,458	11.31% (#3)	682,701	11.91% (#3)	1 / 199	0	Opposition
2022 (Note: Run as associate member party within United for Hungary coalition.)	Anett Bősz	152	0.00% (#13)	—N/a		0 / 199	▼1	Extra-parliamentary

=== Local elections – Budapest ===
Candidate	Party	Votes	Proportions
Zoltán Bodnár	Hungarian Liberal Party	12,461	2.10%

== See also ==
- List of political parties in Hungary
