= New Start (Hungary) =

Hungarian political party

New Start Új Kezdet
- Abbreviation: UK
- President: István Sértő-Radics
- Founded: 15 March 2017
- Dissolved: 24 February 2025
- Headquarters: 2100 Gödöllő, Szabó Pál utca 24.
- Ideology: Conservatism; Third Way
- Political position: Centre-right
- European affiliation: European Democratic Party
- Colors: Blue
- National Assembly: 0 / 199
- European Parliament: 0 / 21

Website
- ujkezdet.hu

New Start (Note: Also translated as New Beginning.) (Hungarian: Új Kezdet, pronounced [ˈuːj ˈkɛzdɛt], ÚK), also known as UK, was a political party in Hungary between 2017 and 2025, founded by György Gémesi, mayor of Gödöllő. The party adhered to a Third Way political philosophy.

== History ==
The party was founded in 2017, although Gémesi had floated the formation of his own party on previous occasions. He announced the formation of the party on 15 March, along with its 12-point platform.

In July of that year, Gémesi announced that he was negotiating cooperation with centrist party Politics Can Be Different (LMP). In December 2017, György Gémesi and Bernadett Szél has agreed, that the New Start and the Politics Can Be Different is running together in the 2018 Hungarian parliamentary election. During the election, György Gémesi was elected as MP but later resigned, and Krisztina Hohn replaced him on 11 June. She joined the Politics Can Be Different group at the National Assembly.

In July 2018, György Gémesi announced that his party would no longer cooperate with the LMP for the next year's European Parliament and municipal elections.

At the European level, the party joined the European Democratic Party in February 2019.

The party ran within the United for Hungary as an associate member in the 2022 Hungarian parliamentary election, but neither of its two constituencial candidates won a mandate.

The party was dissolved in 2025 without any financial debt.

== Ideology ==
- Representing democratic values, promoting the enforcement of the rule of law.
- Increasing the well-being of Hungarian citizens and ensuring the sustainable development of the economy.
- Strengthen the unity of the Hungarian nation.
- Implementation of a policy that is conducive to recognizing our country as a respected member of the democracies.
- Provide favorable conditions for young people to learn, to work and to set up a family.
- Statements of MEPs in parliamentary, municipal and European Parliament elections.
- Give its members the opportunity to engage in public life.

== Leadership at the foundation ==
- President: György Gémesi
- Vice-president: Györgyi Ambrus
- Vice-president: Adrienn Pusztai-Csató
- Vice-president: Krisztina Hohn
- Vice-president: Róbert Molnár
- Chairman of the caucus: Gábor Üveges
