= György Gémesi =

Hungarian doctor and politician

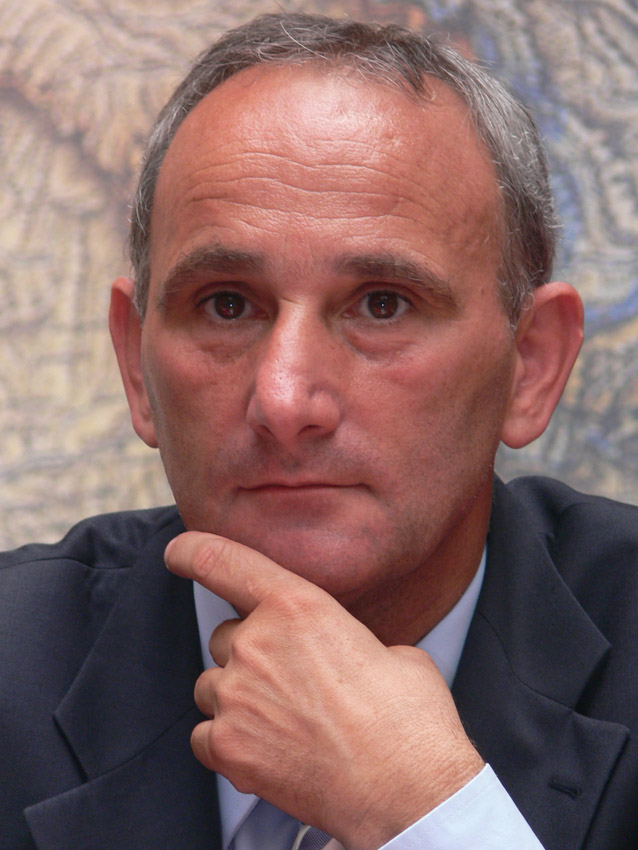
- György Gémesi in 2006

Mayor of Gödöllő
- Incumbent
- Assumed office 20 October 1990
- Preceded by: István Papp as Chairman of the Council

Member of the National Assembly
- In office 8 May 2018 – 30 May 2018
- In office 18 June 1998 – 15 May 2006

Personal details
- Born: 3 January 1956 (age 70) Budapest, Hungary
- Party: MDF (1989–2006); ÚK (since 2017)
- Children: Márton; Gergely; Gabriella
- Profession: physician, politician

György Gémesi (born 3 January 1956) is a Hungarian doctor and politician. He is the current mayor of Gödöllő since 1990 and the president of New Start Party (Új Kezdet). Between 1998 and 2006 was Member of the National Parliament of Hungary. He represented the Constituency of Gödöllő, as a Member of the Hungarian Democratic Forum. He is the President of the Alliance of Hungarian Local-Governments (since 1991).

== Career ==
Gémesi worked between 1980 and 1985 as doctor in National Institute of Physical Education and Sports Health. After, he worked between 1985 and 1990 in Hospital Ferenc Flór. In August 1989 stepped in Hungarian Democratic Forum (MDF). In October 1990, as the candidate of the Hungarian Democratic Forum, elected Mayor. The people of Gödöllő re-elected in 1994, 1998, 2002, 2006, 2010 and 2014 too. He was in 1991 one of the founders than the Alliance of Hungarian Local-Governments. It was in 1994 the Member of Party's National Committee. It was in 1994 the Vice-President of MDF, his task was the local-government affairs. Between March 1996 and May 2000, he worked as the Manager-President. It was in February 2003 the Vice-President of Party, his task was the communication, then from August his task was the campaign management for election of the European Parliament. In 2006, resigned from the Vice-Presidency. In 2017, announced at the city's celebration of Gödöllő, that found a new party. The new political organization's name is "New Start" (Új Kezdet)

== Personal life ==
He is divorced and has two daughters, Márta and Gabriella and a son, Gergely.

== Sources ==
- Adatlapja az Országgyűlés honlapján
- Személyes honlapja
