= Tibor Nunkovics =

Hungarian economist and politician (born 1984)

Member of the National Assembly of Hungary
- In office 8 July 2019 – April 2022

Personal details
- Born: 8 May 1984 (age 41) Esztergom, Hungary
- Party: Jobbik

Nunkovics Tibor (born 8 May 1984) is a Hungarian economist and politician who served in the National Assembly of Hungary. He was appointed member of parliament after Lajos Kepli resigned his seat on 25 June 2019. In 2022, during the parliamentary elections, Tibor lost his seat and was not re-elected.
