= Krisztina Hohn =

Hungarian politician

Member of the National Assembly
- In office 11 June 2018 – 1 May 2022

Personal details
- Born: 16 June 1972 (age 53) Komló, Hungary
- Party: New Start (Hungary)

Krisztina Hohn (born 16 June 1972 in Komló, Hungary) is a Hungarian politician of the New Start (Hungary). She has served as the mayor of Mánfa from 2006 to 2018. She served as a member of parliament in the National Assembly of Hungary from 2018 to 2022. She functioned as the vice-chairman of the Parliamentary Committee on Budgets. In the 2018 parliamentary elections in Hungary, he represented the 2nd OEVK of Baranya County. Krisztina Hohn replaced György Gémesi.
