= Gábor Simon (politician, 1972) =

Hungarian jurist and politician

Member of the National Assembly
- In office 15 May 2002 – 5 May 2014

Personal details
- Born: 29 February 1972 (age 54) Miskolc, Hungary
- Party: MSZP (since 1996)
- Profession: jurist, politician

Dr. Gábor Simon (born 29 February 1972) is a Hungarian jurist and politician, member of the National Assembly from 2002 to 2014. He represented his hometown, Miskolc between 2002 and 2010.

== Biography ==
Simon finished a specialised IT section of Földes Ferenc Secondary Grammar School in Miskolc in 1990. He continued his studies at the Faculty of Law of University of Miskolc and also studied at universities abroad, including several courses at the Faculty of Law of the University of Salzburg, as well as universities in Frankfurt and Heidelberg. He received his J.D. in 1995 and started his career as an attorney candidate. He has worked as an independent attorney in his legal firm since he passed the bar examination in 1998. His primary field of practice is civil law. He was a founder of the Foundation for the Reconstruction of Szent Imre School in 1997 and the Foundation for the Development of the Diósgyőr Castle Region in 2001. He has been a member of the Civil Guards since 2001.

A senior-year university student during the local elections in December 1994, he ran as an independent candidate of the Hungarian Socialist Party (MSZP) and was elected to the General Assembly of Miskolc. He was re-elected in his constituency in October 1998. He joined the Hungarian Socialist Party on 1 January 1996. He was on the local presidium of the party from 1997 until 1999. He was elected vice president of the local party unit in 2001. From 1997 until 1999, he was a member of the committee on national conciliation and ethics. He served as a member of the party's national board from 1999 to 2000.

He was elected MP for Miskolc in the 2002 parliamentary election. He became a member of the Committee on Constitution and Judicial Affairs in May 2002 and joined the Committee on Human Rights, Minorities and Religion in June 2002. An individual candidate in the local elections on 20 October 2002, he was elected member of the General Assembly of Miskolc for a third term. In the assembly, he has worked as a member of the Environmental Protection Committee and the Committee on Energy Affairs. In the 2006 parliamentary election, he obtained a seat for Miskolc again. From 30 May 2006 to 13 May 2010, he was a member of the Constitutional, Judicial and Standing Orders Committee. He became MP from his party's National List during the 2010 parliamentary election. He was appointed Vice Chairman of the Committee on Immunity, Incompatibility and Mandate on 17 May 2010.
