= Zoltán Bodnár =

Hungarian economist

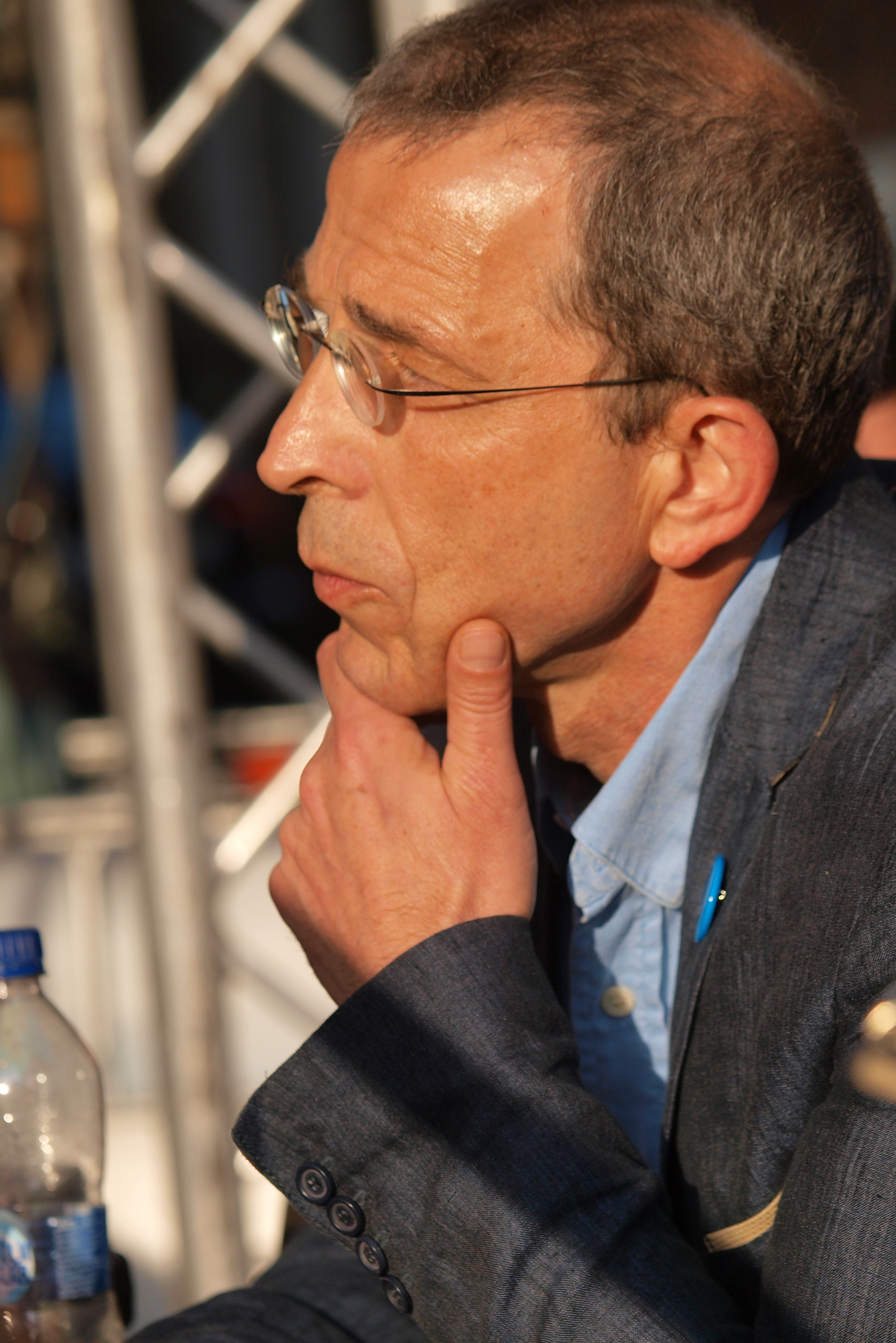
- Zoltán Bodnár in 2015
- Born: December 20, 1958 (age 67); Salgótarján, Hungary
- Education: Eötvös Loránd University
- Occupations: Chairman, President & CEO of Magyar Export-Import Bank

Zoltán Bodnár (born 20 December 1958) is a Hungarian economist, banker and jurist, former CEO of the Magyar Export-Import Bank (Exim). He was also Deputy Governor of the Hungarian National Bank (MNB) from 1997 to 1998.

Bodnár was nominated as candidate for the position of Mayor of Budapest by the Hungarian Liberal Party (MLP) during the 2014 municipal elections, receiving 2.1 percent of the vote. Following that he was financial advisor and chargé d'affaires within the party until his resignation on 21 October 2016. He quit the party in the next month. In 2017, he was involved in the Hungarian Progressive Movement.
