= New World People's Party =

New World People's Party Új Világ Néppárt
- President: József Pálinkás
- Founded: 16 October 2020
- Dissolved: 19 May 2022
- Membership (2021): 80
- Ideology: Liberal conservatism Christian democracy Economic liberalism Pro-Europeanism
- Political position: Centre-right
- National affiliation: United for Hungary

Website
- ujvilagneppart.hu

The New World People's Party (Hungarian: Új Világ Néppárt, pronounced [ˈuːj ˈvilaːɡ ˈneːpːaːrt]) was a short-lived Hungarian political party between 2020 and 2022. It was founded by József Pálinkás, the former Minister of Education under Viktor Orbán and former member of Fidesz.
