= Democratic Coalition (Hungary) =

Hungarian political party

Democratic Coalition Demokratikus Koalíció
- Abbreviation: DK
- Leader: László Varju
- Executive Vice President: Csaba Molnár
- Vice Presidents: See list: Zita Bakai-Nagy; István Bakk; István Kenéz; Dániel Székely
- Founder: Ferenc Gyurcsány
- Founded: 22 October 2011; 14 years ago
- Split from: Hungarian Socialist Party
- Headquarters: 1066 Budapest, Teréz körút 46.
- Newspaper: Nyugati Fény
- Youth wing: Demokratikus Lendület
- Membership: ▲15,000 (2022)
- Ideology: Social democracy; Social liberalism; Progressivism; European federalism
- Political position: Centre-left
- National affiliation: Unity (2014); United for Hungary (2020–2022); DK–MSZP–Dialogue (2024)
- European affiliation: Party of European Socialists
- European Parliament group: Progressive Alliance of Socialists and Democrats
- Colours: Blue; Red
- National Assembly: 0 / 199
- European Parliament: 2 / 21
- County Assemblies: 40 / 381
- General Assembly of Budapest: 3 / 33

Party flag

Website
- dkp.hu

The Democratic Coalition (Hungarian: Demokratikus Koalíció [ˈdɛmokrɒtikuʃ ˈkoɒliːt͡sioː], DK [ˈdeːkaː]) is a social democratic and social-liberal political party in Hungary. Founded in 2010 by former prime minister Ferenc Gyurcsány as a faction within the Hungarian Socialist Party (MSZP), the Democratic Coalition split from the MSZP on 22 October 2011 and became a separate party. Until the 2026 parliamentary election it had fifteen MPs in the National Assembly, but at those elections it failed to reach the 5% threshold required and so no longer has any representatives there, although it still has two MEPs in the European Parliament.

== History ==
=== Within the Socialist Party ===
On 5 October 2010, Ferenc Gyurcsány announced to the Socialist Party (MSZP) party executive that he was founding a platform named the Democratic Coalition within the party. He stated that he would organize "a broad, open social community for 1989 Democrats", and political representation for them. The mood at the meeting was calm, but several party officials expressed disagreement with him. The plan, however, pushed through.

The Democratic Coalition held its inaugural meeting at 2 p.m. in the Szent István Park in the 13th District on 22 October 2010. Meanwhile, MSZP deputy chairman András Balogh told newspaper Népszava that the party performed poorly at the elections due to several mistakes which included incompetence of Gyurcsány's while in government, the abandonment of left-wing values, complacency, and the fact that Gyurcsány was involved in corruption. The former prime minister's group became the MSZP's seventh platform.

The platforms within the MSZP held a debate in May 2011 on whether the party should develop as an alliance between left-wing groups or a collective party welcoming non-leftist groups and politicians – a broader alternative to the ruling party Fidesz. The latter idea was only supported by the Democratic Coalition Platform. Representatives from all seven platforms of the party agreed that the Socialists did not need a "chieftain", an "Orbán of the Left", but a team leader. This was according to István Hiller, the head of the Social Democratic Platform, in an interview with reporters during a break of the meeting. He dismissed Gyurcsány's idea of embracing liberal and conservative trends, stating that Gyurcsány's model would make the party dysfunctional.

=== New party ===
On 22 October 2011, Gyurcsány announced he was leaving the Hungarian Socialist Party (MSZP) and would set up a new parliamentary group after persuading the necessary number of lawmakers to join him. The new Democratic Coalition party was to be a "Western, Left-wing" formation with ten lawmakers. Gyurcsány announced on the first anniversary of the founding of its forerunner, the Democratic Coalition Platform. He stated that he had decided to leave the MSZP because the party had failed in its efforts to transform itself. Socialist representatives strongly condemned Gyurcsány, who had signed a pledge to stay on in the party the previous week. In his speech Gyurcsány branded the new constitution as "illegitimate" and insisted that members and heads of the independent branches of state such as the constitutional court and the public prosecutor "exclusively serve Viktor Orbán".

The former Democratic Party (Demokrata Párt) changed its name to Democratic Coalition (DK) and elected Gyurcsány its leader on 6 November 2011. At a press conference, Gyurcsány announced that the renewed party had elected Tamás Bauer, József Debreczeni, Csaba Molnár and Péter Niedermüller as deputy chairmen. The announcement stated that DK would be Hungary's "most democratic party" with all the members electing its officials directly at the party congress, adding that the authority of each member in the party's 12-strong presidium and the chairman itself will be virtually the same. The new party initially received over 3,800 membership applications.

The Democratic Coalition was not allowed to form a new party faction until the spring after leaving the MSZP, based on the parliament's Constitutional and Procedural Committee decision on 7 November 2011. According to the parliamentary rules, any parliamentarian that leaves or is expelled from a party faction must sit as an independent candidate for six months before joining another faction. However, in April 2012, ruling party Fidesz approved new House rules which required that 12 MPs – rather than 10 as per previous rules – were needed to form a faction, thus blocking DK from forming a parliamentary group. Gyurcsány described this as "petty revenge on the part of the prime minister." Csaba Molnár said they might take the matter to the Constitutional Court and European forums.

=== Cooperation negotiations of 2014 ===
In September 2013, the MSZP declined to sign an election deal with DK and Gábor Fodor's Hungarian Liberal Party (MLP) because both parties presented excessive expectations in proportion to their electoral support. Attila Mesterházy told a forum held at the party headquarters, broadcast by commercial news channel ATV, that in order to win the next year's election, the MSZP need to win over uncertain voters. He added that the party board decided that running with Gyurcsány would keep uncertain voters away. Gyurcsány said the MSZP had instead proposed alliances of four rather than nine constituencies, all of which were impossible to win. In addition, they offered every 25th place on their party list and would have banned Gyurcsány himself from running either individually or on a list. Another request was that DK should not present a platform of its own. The party could not accept these conditions, the politician said.

On 14 January 2014, centre-left opposition parties agreed to submit a joint list for the spring 2014 general election. The list was headed by MSZP leader Attila Mesterházy, the centre-left alliance's candidate for Prime Minister. Mesterházy was followed by Gordon Bajnai (Together 2014) as second and Ferenc Gyurcsány as third. Liberal leader Gábor Fodor was entered at fourth place and co-leader of the E14-PM alliance and the Dialogue for Hungary. Tímea Szabó was entered at fifth place on the joint list of the MSZP, E2014-PM, DK, and Liberals. The Liberals also received two additional places (56th and 58th) on the list. The party eventually won 4 seats.

In the 2014 European election, DK received 9.75% of the vote, and had two MEPs returned. On 26 May 2014, Csaba Molnar announced that DK had applied to join the Progressive Alliance of Socialists and Democrats.

=== Independent performance and united opposition ===
Party logo, 2022–25

The party ran alone in the 2018 parliamentary election, receiving 5.38% of votes and electing nine candidates to the National Assembly.

In the 2019 European election, DK did very well, scoring 16.08%, overtaking the MSZP and Jobbik and becoming the leading opposition party. In 2019 local elections, the party had its best performance in Tatabánya and in Budapest, where three district mayorships were won.

In 2020, two more mayorships in Budapest were added to DK after two mayors, elected as MSZP candidates, joined Democratic Coalition. After this DK became the second largest party in General Assembly of Budapest (after Fidesz–KDNP alliance) and the largest party in opposition's coalition, which is ruling in the Budapest.

In late 2020, the party formed the United for Hungary electoral coalition along with the Momentum Movement, MSZP, Jobbik, Dialogue, LMP – Hungary's Green Party, and the Liberals.

In 2021, the party took part in the coalition's primary. In this, it joined forces with the Liberals, running 2019 European Parliament election lead candidate Klára Dobrev as candidate for prime minister. The DK–Liberal ticket won a plurality in the first round of the election for the coalition's candidate for prime minister, with Dobrev placing first with 34.84% of votes and the parties' candidates being selected to run for 32 of the 106 single-member districts. Dobrev then proceeded to a runoff against independent candidate Péter Márki-Zay, who was endorsed by withdrawn second-place Dialogue–MSZP–LMP candidate Gergely Karácsony, Momentum, and the MSZP. Márki-Zay won the runoff with 56.71% of votes to Dobrev's 43.29%.

In the parliamentary elections held on 12 April 2026, the DK failed to reach the 5% threshold required for parliamentary representation, and so lost all 15 seats it had held until then in the National Assembly. Dobrev announced her resignation as party leader, accepting responsibility for the electoral defeat.

In the 2026 leadership election, former MP and re-running candidate for the parliamentary elections, László Varju was elected via online voting.

== Political positions and international affiliation ==
Prior to the foundation of the Democratic Coalition, its leader Ferenc Gyurcsány was described a historical advocate of a Third Way policy approach and of social liberalism, with his term as prime minister for the Hungarian Socialist Party having been marked by the implementation of austerity measures. In its 2013 manifesto, DK called for a social market economy model, describing a market economy as the "economic foundation of freedom" and the welfare state and employment policy as bringing economic security.

For the 2019 European Parliament election, DK took a European federalist position, advocating for a "United States of Europe". In its campaign, DK advocated several centre-left fiscal and welfare proposals, including an EU-wide minimum pension, minimum wage, and family allowance funded by increased taxation of multinational corporations, and integration of European health policies, thus blending increasingly social-democratic positions with support for European integration.

The Democratic Coalition opposes the government of Viktor Orbán and the changes effected to the electoral system, judiciary, and the independence of the press in the 2011 Hungarian constitution, which Gyurcsány has described as "illegitimate".

The party is a full member party of the Party of European Socialists and its MEPs are members of the Progressive Alliance of Socialists and Democrats (S&D). Following the 2019 European election, the Democratic Coalition dismissed an invitation to join the Alliance of Liberals and Democrats for Europe and chose to remain in the S&D group.

In October 2022, the party became an associate member of the Party of European Socialists.

== Election results ==
=== National Assembly ===
Election	Leader	Constituency		Party list		Seats	+/–	Status
Election	Leader	Votes	%	Votes	%	Seats	+/–	Status
2014 (Note: Run within Unity coalition.)	Ferenc Gyurcsány	1,317,879	26.85 (#2)	1,290,806	25.57 (#2)	4 / 199	New	Opposition
2018	Ferenc Gyurcsány	348,176	6.33 (#4)	308,161	5.38 (#5)	9 / 199	▲5	Opposition
2022 (Note: Run within United for Hungary coalition.)	Ferenc Gyurcsány	1,983,708	36.90 (#2)	1,947,331	34.44 (#2)	15 / 199	▲6	Opposition
2026	Klára Dobrev (Note: Resigned the day of the election.)	65,302	1.08 (#4)	70,298	1.10 (#4)	0 / 199	▼15	Extra-parliamentary

=== European Parliament ===
Election	List leader	Votes	%	Seats	+/−	EP Group
2014	Csaba Molnár	226,086	9.75 (#4)	2 / 21	New	S&D
2019	Klára Dobrev	557,081	16.05 (#2)	4 / 21	▲2	S&D
2024 (Note: Run as part of the DK–MSZP–Dialogue coalition.)	Klára Dobrev	367,162	8.03 (#3)	2 / 21	▼2	S&D

== Local elections ==
- Angéla Németh – Budapest XV District (since 2018)
- József Tóth – Polgár (since 2014)
- Imre László – Budapest XI District (since 2019)
- Péter Niedermüller – Budapest VII District (since 2019)
- Ilona Szücsné Posztovics – Tatabánya (since 2019)
- László Kiss Dr – Budapest III District (since 2020)
- Sándor Szaniszló – Budapest XVIII District (since 2020)
- Norbert Trippon Dr – Budapest IV District (since 2024)
- Jácint Horváth – Nagykanizsa (since 2024)

== See also ==
- List of political parties in Hungary
