= Alliance of Free Democrats =

Alliance of Free Democrats – the Hungarian Liberal Party Szabad Demokraták Szövetsége – a Magyar Liberális Párt
- Abbreviation: SZDSZ
- First leader: János Kis
- Last leader: Viktor Szabadai
- Founded: 13 November 1988
- Dissolved: 30 October 2013
- Headquarters: 1143 Budapest, XIV. Gizella utca 36.
- Ideology: Social liberalism; Economic liberalism; Pro-Europeanism; Historically: Liberalism
- Political position: Centre
- European affiliation: Alliance of Liberals and Democrats for Europe
- European Parliament group: Alliance of Liberals and Democrats for Europe (2004–2009)
- International affiliation: Liberal International
- Colours: Blue

Website
- www.szdsz.hu (in Hungarian; as of October 2012, home page offered link to English module)

The Alliance of Free Democrats – Hungarian Liberal Party (Hungarian: Szabad Demokraták Szövetsége – a Magyar Liberális Párt [ˈsɒbɒd ˈdɛmokrɒtaːk ˈsøvɛt͡ʃːeːɡɛ ˈɒː ˈmɒɟɒr ˈlibɛraːliʃ ˈpaːrt], SZDSZ [ˈɛzdeːjɛs]) was a liberal political party in Hungary.

The SZDSZ was a member of the Alliance of Liberals and Democrats for Europe Party and of Liberal International. It drew its support predominantly from Budapest among the middle classes, liberal intellectuals and entrepreneurs, with an ideological basis in social and economic liberalism. SZDSZ provided the first freely elected President for the Third Hungarian Republic, Árpád Göncz. The SZDSZ High Mayor of Budapest, Gábor Demszky was in office continuously since 1990 till 2010, when he was replaced by István Tarlós (who himself was a member of SZDSZ in the 1990s).

== History ==
The party's origins lay in the illegal democratic opposition under the communist rule of János Kádár. This gave rise to the loosely organized Network of Free Initiatives (Szabad Kezdeményezések Hálózata) on 1 May 1988 and to the foundation of the SZDSZ as an opposition political party on 13 November 1988. Its founding leaders included János Kis, Márton Tardos, Gáspár Miklós Tamás, and Miklós Haraszti.

The party initially suggested a radical agenda for changing the political, social and economic system in the country. It suffered a close defeat at the first free general elections of the Third Republic in 1990, thus becoming the leading opposition force in the first free National Assembly (Hungary's parliament).

After the fall of the conservative Hungarian Democratic Forum-led government at the following 1994 parliamentary election, SZDSZ surprised many by entering into a coalition with the Hungarian Socialist Party (MSZP), the legal successor party to the communist Hungarian Socialist Workers' Party. Thus began a strategic alliance between the two parties that lasted for 14 years, ending only in 2008. The coalition successfully defeated Orbán's Fidesz in 1994, 2002 and 2006.

The heyday of the SZDSZ may be thought to have ended when it suffered heavy losses in the 1998 parliamentary election. In 2002 parliamentary election, it gained only 5.5 percent of the vote, returning 20 deputies to the National Assembly.

Until its withdrawal from the coalition in May 2008, the SZDSZ had three portfolios. It also had a delegation in the European Parliament, receiving 7.7 percent of the Hungarian vote and two MEPs in the 2004 European Parliament election.

In the 2006 parliamentary election, it gained no directly elected seats, but 6.5 percent of the list votes, thus securing 20 members in Hungary's 386-seat National Assembly. This was the first time that the party managed to increase its support compared with a previous general election. The MSZP–SZDSZ coalition had a small majority in the new National Assembly intake.

On 31 March 2008, various reform-related disagreements between the MSZP and SZDSZ led the SZDSZ leader János Kóka to announce that his party would exit the coalition by 1 May 2008. This also meant that the MSZP would have to form the first minority government in Hungary since the change of regime in 1989.

However, the legitimacy of Kóka's position as party president became questioned when it was discovered that some signatures of the delegates to the assembly electing him had been forged. Since he had won his position by a very small margin over Fodor, these votes might have changed the outcome. So a new leadership election was held in June and Fodor was returned.

In the 2009 European Parliament election, SZDSZ retained none of its seats with just 2.2 percent of the total vote, less than half of the minimum five percent needed to secure representation. The party did not even receive five percent in Budapest, its traditional stronghold. Party president Fodor offered his resignation as soon as the official tally was announced at 10:00 p.m.

In the 2010 parliamentary election, SZDSZ won only 0.25 percent of the vote and was shut out of the legislature altogether for the first time since the change of regime. The party was even unable to gain parliamentary seats in Budapest. The Alliance of Free Democrats officially ceased to exist in October 2013. A few months prior their official dissolution the Hungarian Liberal Party was formed.

== Political positions ==
The ideology of the Alliance of Free Democrats has been described as socially and economically liberal, pro-NATO, and pro-EU. It used to be liberal in general.

== Election results ==
=== National Assembly ===
Election	Votes			Seats		Rank	Government	Prime Minister candidate
Election	#	%	±pp	#	+/−	Rank	Government	Prime Minister candidate
1990	1,050,452	21.4%	–	94 / 386	±0	2nd	In opposition	János Kis
1994	1,066,074	19.7%	▼1.7	70 / 386	▼24	2nd	MSZP-SZDSZ Supermajority	Iván Pető
1998	353,186	7.88%	▼11.82	24 / 386	▼46	4th	In opposition	Gábor Kuncze
2002	313,084	5.57%	▼2.31	20 / 386	▼4	3rd	MSZP-SZDSZ Majority	Gábor Kuncze
2006	351,612	6.5%	▲0.93	20 / 386	0	3rd	MSZP-SZDSZ Majority (until 2008)	Gábor Kuncze
2010^{1}	12,652	0.25%	▼6.25	0 / 386	▼20	8th	Extra-parliamentary	–

^{1} 10 joint candidates with the Hungarian Democratic Forum (MDF).

=== European Parliament ===
Election year	# of overall votes	% of overall vote	# of overall seats won	±	Notes
2004	237,908	7.77% (3rd)	2 / 24		
2009	62,527	2.16% (6th)	0 / 22	▼2	

== Party leaders ==
- János Kis – 23 February 1990 to 23 November 1991
- Péter Tölgyessy – 23 November 1991 to 13 November 1992
- Iván Pető – 13 November 1992 to 24 April 1997
- Gábor Kuncze – 24 April 1997 to 20 June 1998
- Bálint Magyar – 20 June 1998 to December 2000
- Gábor Demszky – December 2000 to June 2001
- Gábor Kuncze – June 2001 to 31 March 2007
- János Kóka – 31 March 2007 to 7 June 2008
- Gábor Fodor – 7 June 2008 to 12 July 2009
- Attila Retkes – 12 July 2009 to 29 May 2010
- Viktor Szabadai – 16 July 2010 to 30 October 2013

== See also ==
- Liberal democracy
- Contributions to liberal theory
- Liberalism
- Liberalism and radicalism in Hungary
- Liberalism worldwide
- List of liberal parties
- List of political parties in Hungary
