= Béla Endre =

Hungarian painter and designer

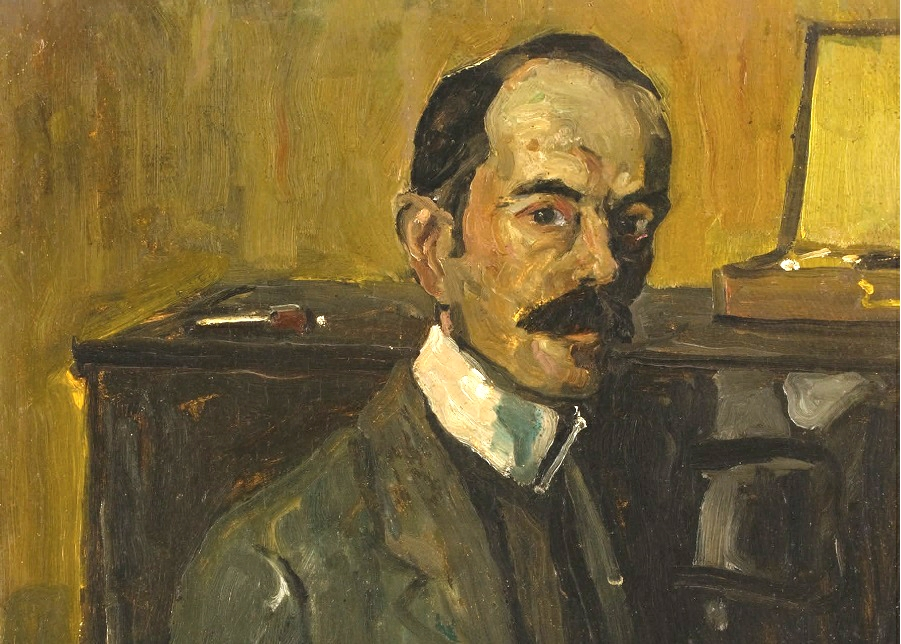
Self-portrait (date unknown)

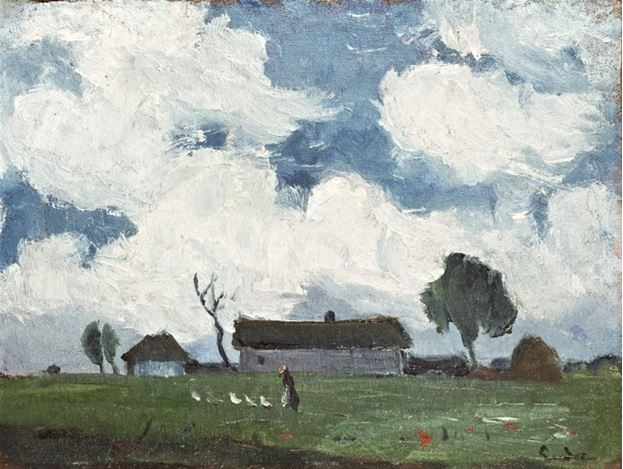
Farm House on the Plain

Béla Endre (19 November 1870, in Szeged – 12 August 1928, in Mártély) was a Hungarian painter and designer, one of the most prominent representatives of the Great Plain School.

== Biography ==
He was born in the famous "Black House" of Szeged, built by his grandfather, the merchant Ferdinand Mayer (1817–1903). Originally destined for a career in engineering, he chose to pursue art instead; studying painting locally for a few years, then at the Accademia Raffaello in Urbino from 1895 to 1897 and the Académie Julian in Paris from 1898 to 1900. In 1901, he settled in Hódmezővásárhely, where he had a studio that he shared with János Tornyai and Gyulá Rudnay.

In 1912, he helped to establish the "Majolica and Clay Artists' Society" (Művészek Majolika és Agyagipari Telep-ének) and held his first exhibition in Hódmezővásárhely. He held further exhibits in Makó (1913) and Arad (1914), which was a joint showing with his studio partners.

From 1910 until his death, he spent his summers in Mártély, painting the people and the landscapes of the Great Hungarian Plain. His works show the influence of Mihály Munkácsy and the artists of the Nagybányai Art Colony; although they also have certain Post-Impressionistic features.

Many of his works are at the Tornyai János Múzeum, but some may also be seen at the Hungarian National Gallery and the Móra Ferenc Múzeum, among others. In 1970, to commemorate the 100th anniversary of his birth, memorial exhibitions were held in Hódmezővásárhely, Budapest and Szeged. In 2005, a permanent memorial was opened at the Ópusztaszer National Heritage Park.

== Sources ==
- László Emőke: Endre Béla festészete. Móra Ferenc Múzeum (1968) Online ISSN 2064-8480
- László Emőke: "Endre Béla", Art Library, Vol.85, Corvina Kiadó (1973) Listing
