= Isophya costata =

Conservation status
- Least Concern (IUCN 3.1)

Scientific classification
- Kingdom: Animalia
- Phylum: Arthropoda
- Clade: Pancrustacea
- Class: Insecta
- Order: Orthoptera
- Suborder: Ensifera
- Family: Tettigoniidae
- Subfamily: Phaneropterinae
- Genus: Isophya
- Species: I. costata

Binomial name
- Isophya costata Brunner von Wattenwyl, 1878

Species of insect

Isophya costata, the keeled plump bush-cricket or Hungarian tarsza, is a species of bush-cricket in the family Tettigoniidae, endemic to the Pannonian Basin.

== Description ==
A singing Hungarian tarsza

The body length of the Hungarian tarsza is 19–24 mm (0.75–0.94 in) in males and 22–26 mm (0.87–1.02 in) in females, with an additional 14–16 mm (0.55–0.63 in) ovipositor in females. It is one of the largest representatives of its genus. Its base colour is green. A white line runs backward from the eye along the edges of the pronotum and through the margin of the wing to the wing's tip. At the end of the pronotum, the white line is accompanied on the inside by a reddish-brown stripe. The top of the forehead is considerably wider than in other Isophya species, roughly corresponding to the length of the first antennal segment. The antennae are long, yellow in the first third and green thereafter. The wings are vestigial and scale-like; in the male, the visible wing length is slightly shorter than that of the pronotum, while in the female the wing length is about half that of the pronotum. The male's tegmen is asymmetrical: viewed from above, the left wing is triangular and brownish, with two strong green cross-veins visible. The male's cerci are robust at the base and curve inward in their final third. The female's ovipositor is long, curves upward, and is reddish-brown and saw-toothed at the tip.

Its call is louder than that of other Isophya species. The song consists of solitary syllables, occasionally in groups, separated by pauses of 2–3 seconds.

=== Similar species ===
It can be easily confused with its close relatives: the Carpathian tarsza, Isophya kraussii, Isophya modesta, Isophya modestior, Isophya pienensis and Isophya stysi.

== Distribution ==
It is native to the Carpathian Basin; besides Hungary it has populations in eastern Austria, northern Serbia, and western Romania. In Hungary, small, low-density, island-like populations occur in the Bakony, the Balaton Uplands, the Buda Hills, the Bükk region, the Mecsek, the Villány Hills, the south-eastern Great Hungarian Plain (Mártély), the Mezőföld, and the Little Hungarian Plain (Fertő region).

== Life cycle ==
It is a relict of the steppe fauna of the Ice Age. It inhabits tall-grass, moderately moist or semi-dry, dicot-rich loess grasslands, steppe meadows, slope-steppes, and fen meadows that dry out in summer. It favours habitats rich in dropwort (Filipendula hexapetala), meadow-rue (Thalictrum sp.), lady's bedstraw (Galium verum), and various legumes (e.g. Vicia sp., Lathyrus sp.). Unlike other tarsza species, it avoids forest edges and clearings. It feeds on the leaves of various dicotyledonous plants. It stays hidden during the day and is active in the late afternoon and evening. It is flightless and a weak jumper, protected from predators by its green colouring, which blends into the background.

The female lays her eggs in the soil; these may overwinter up to four times before the larvae hatch in early spring. Adults appear in May and typically complete their life cycle by late June or early July. Due to extreme weather conditions observed in recent times, this reproductive cycle can shift months earlier, with current observations and weather patterns suggesting it may now be completed as early as late April or early May. In Hungary it is strictly protected, with a conservation value of 100,000 forints.
