= Emil Lindenfeld =

American painter

Emil Lindenfeld (1905 – 1986) was a Hungarian-American oil-painter. He is best known for his vibrant choice of colors painting working people, idyllic pastoral landscapes, sensuous nudes, peasants on the field but, perhaps his most dramatic theme, the life of the miner.

== Early years ==
Emil Lindenfeld was born in Hódmezővásárhely, Hungary, in 1905. His family was Jewish. He began his art studies under the supervision of János Tornyai, a Hungarian master of the 20th century. At age 15, the town held an exhibition of his paintings in the local movie theater.

In 1926, at age 21, he moved to Milan, Italy. He started to paint large numbers of massive compositions of working people, idyllic pastoral landscapes, sensuous nudes, and peasants on the field. His most dramatic theme was the life of the miner. He also painted the lagoons of Venice, the tired resting people on the park bench, portraits of Christ and the Crucifixion. Exhibitions were held in more and more prestigious galleries and his work was displayed in as many as three to four exhibitions yearly.

== Life during World War II ==
During World War II, Lindenfeld lost his studio, along with all his possessions, in a bombardment. He spent the next few years in a high mountain village named Asiago. During this period, he created several large compositions, mountain-scenes, landscapes and depictions of the lives of the local people. After returning from a life in the mountains, he started to exhibit his new paintings. In 1946, he was elected Councilor of Italian Art. In 1956, the same year of the Hungarian Uprising, he decided to move to New York City.

== United States ==
Lindenfeld was invited to exhibit with Frank Lloyd Wright in the New York Coliseum. He exhibited 150 paintings. Lindenfeld, himself, organized many exhibitions and enriched several American museums with his paintings. During his long career, he tirelessly sought new ways to express himself and his fantasies. In the last phase of his life, his paintings were the perhaps the most revealing of his true self. It came so naturally to him that he often played and sometimes joked with his brushes. It was the most peaceful, happiest and most colorful period of his life.

Lindenfeld died in his home in 1986 and he was buried in a small, historic cemetery in Bedminster, New Jersey.

== Periods of Color ==
Lindenfeld passed through 16 distinct periods. Scholars cite four distinctive phases: the Essential Phase, the Impressionistic Phase, the Mirage Phase and the Post Humane Phase. Most significant of which the colors, the dominating ones, change in each period. He had a flamboyant yellow period, he passed through his blue gloomy period, and his vibrant orange period. Emil's last three phases were: the Impressionistic, the Mirage and the Birth of the Universe.
