= György Magyar =

Hungarian lawyer and politician

Personal details
- Born: 23 October 1949 (age 76) Budapest, Hungary
- Party: Independent
- Other political affiliations: MMM (2018–present); United for Hungary (2020–present)
- Spouse: Anikó (m. 1973)
- Children: 3
- Education: Eötvös Loránd University
- Profession: Lawyer; politician; university teacher
- Awards: Miklós Radnóti Antiracist Award
- Website: György Magyar website

György Magyar (born 23 October 1949) is a Hungarian lawyer, politician and university teacher. He has served as Vice Chairman of the Everybody's Hungary Movement since 2018.

In 1973, he graduated from the Faculty of Law of the Eötvös Loránd University.

Magyar was the MP candidate of the MSZP–P coalition in the 4th constituency of Somogy County in the 2018 Hungarian parliamentary election. He received 11,221 votes (25.02%), and finished 2nd behind Mihály Witzmann of Fidesz.

== Famous clients ==
- Attila Ambrus (the Whiskey Robber)
- Ramil Safarov (the Azeri Axe Murderer)
