= Franz Wittmann (physicist) =

Franz Wittman (16 January 1860 in Hódmezővásárhely – 1932 in Budapest) was a Hungarian electrical engineer and physicist. He was educated at the University of Budapest and continued his studies in Vienna, Berlin, Paris, Frankfurt-am-Main, Darmstadt and Hanover. In 1892, he was appointed professor of physics at the polytechnic in Budapest. Five years later, he became a member of the royal patent bureau and secretary of the board of examiners for teachers in intermediate schools.

Wittmann's works, which have made him the leading Hungarian authority on electrotechnics, include the following:

- "Az Inductiv Taszításról" (on inductive repulsion)
- "Periodikus Áramok Optikai Vizsgálata" (optical tests of periodical currents)
- "Budapest Villamvilágításáról" (electric lighting of Budapest)
- "Az Erős Villamáramok Technikája" (technics of strong electric currents)
- "A Leydeni Batteriák és Induktoriumok Áramának Vizsgálata és Objektív Előállítása" (objective production of currents from Leyden jars and inductors);
- "Kondensatorok Áramának Vizsgálata és Objectív Előállítása" (test and objective production of currents from condensers);
- "Akusztikai Kísérletek" (acoustic experiments)

In addition to these works, Wittmann has published numerous articles on the technical uses of electricity and heat.
