= Óbuda University =

Technical university in Budapest, Hungary

University of Óbuda
- Óbudai Egyetem
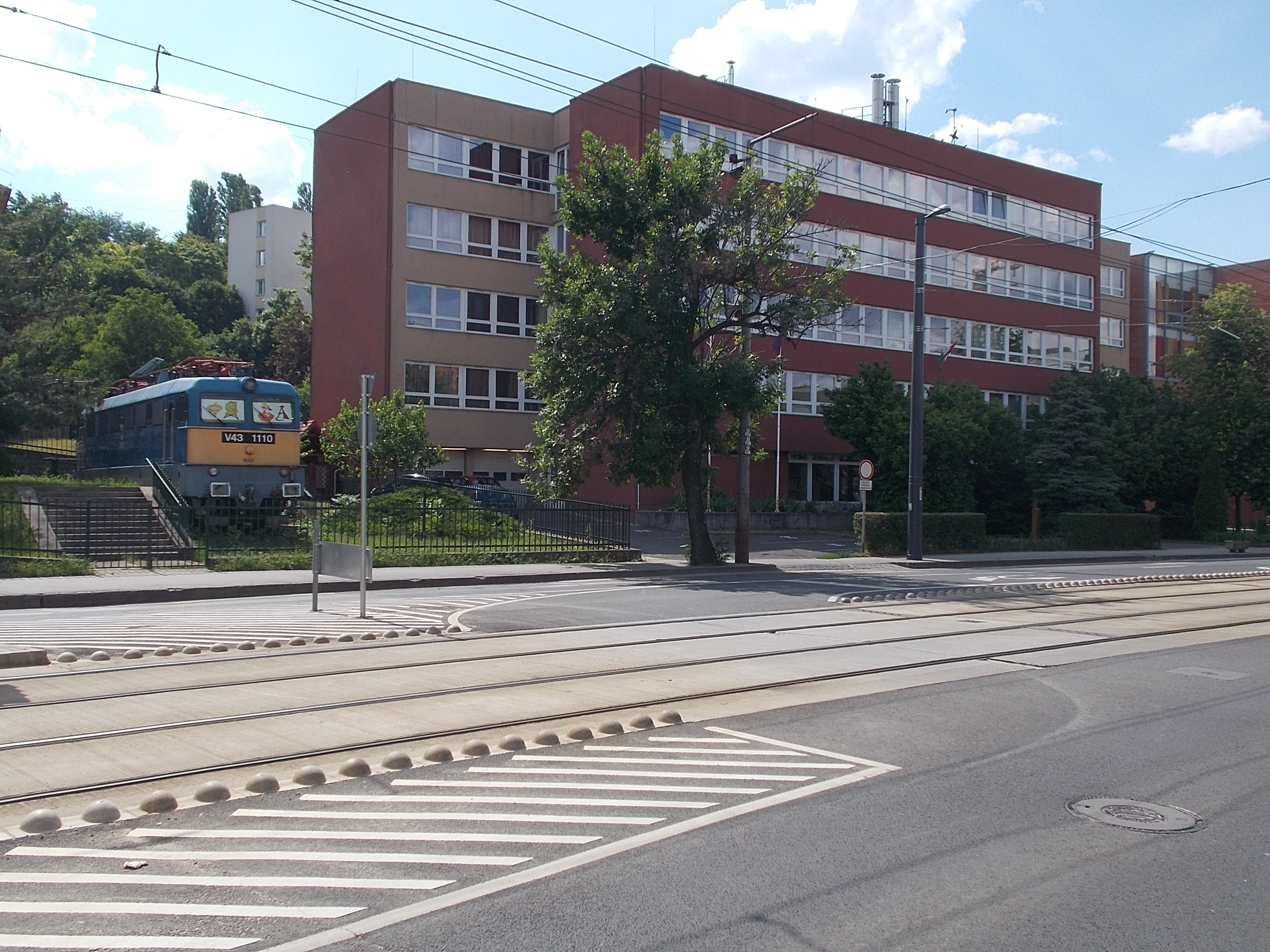
- The main building and its surroundings in 2018
- Latin: Universitas Budensis
- Motto: Pro Scientia et Futuro
- Type: Public
- Established: 2000; 26 years ago
- Affiliations: European University Association
- Chancellor: Gabriella Ormándi
- Rector: Prof. Dr. habil. Levente Kovács
- Administrative staff: 421
- Students: 15,088
- Location: Budapest, Székesfehérvár, Hungary; 47°32′1.6″N 19°2′5.75″E
- Campus: Urban
- Language: Hungarian, English
- Website: www.uni-obuda.hu
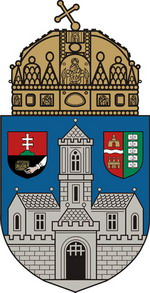

University rankings

Regional – Overall
- QS Emerging Europe and Central Asia: 186 (2022)

The University of Óbuda (Hungarian: Óbudai Egyetem, Latin: Universitas Budensis), named after Óbuda, a part of Budapest, is a university in Budapest, Hungary.

== History ==
It was founded in 2000 as Budapest Tech (Budapesti Műszaki Főiskola) with the merging of three polytechnical institutes: Bánki Donát Technical College, Kandó Kálmán Technical College, and Light Industry Technical College. With more than 15,000 students it is one of the largest technical universities in the country. Having complied with the requirements, the institution was promoted to university status on 1 January 2010 under the name of Óbuda University. In Buda, from the late 1370s, King Louis the Great began large-scale palace construction, which Sigismund expanded on an even larger scale, and then permanently moved his court to Buda in 1408. He founded the first capital university in the center of the country. At the request of the monarch, Pope Boniface IX issued the first charter of the University of Óbuda on October 6, 1395. The Pope granted permission to establish a full university consisting of four faculties. Its head was Lukács Órévi (Provost of Buda, later Bishop of Csanád). Teaching began at all faculties of the new university – theology, canon law, medicine, and liberal arts.

== Organization ==
=== Faculties ===
The university with the merger of former polytechnic institutions has founded the following faculties:

- Alba Regia Technical Faculty (Székesfehérvár)
- Bánki Donát Faculty of Mechanical and Safety Engineering
- Kandó Kálmán Faculty of Electrical Engineering
- Keleti Károly Faculty of Business and Management
- John von Neumann Faculty of Informatics
- Rejtő Sándor Faculty of Light Industry and Environmental Engineering
- Ybl Miklós Faculty of Architecture and Civil Engineering

University rankings

Global – Overall
- THE World: 1001–1200 (2022)
- THE Young Universities: 301-350 (2022)

=== Doctoral schools ===
- Applied Informatics and Applied Mathematics
- Safety and Security Sciences
- Materials Sciences and Technologies
- Innovation Management, the head is Gulácsi László

== Notable alumni ==
- Joseph Galamb - Designer of Ford Model T
- Charles Balough - President of the Hercules Motor Manufacturing Company, designer of Ford T-model
- Júlia Sebestyén - European figure skating champion
- Attila Ferjáncz - Hungarian rally driver, Hungarian champion, sports director
- Imre Gedővári - Hungarian fencer and Olympic gold medalist, sports director
- Lajos Boros - radio presenter, journalist, author and singer
- Rudolf Emil Kálmán - electrical engineer, mathematician, inventor of Kálmán filter
- George Andrew Olah - chemist
- Anita Benes - designer, founder of Daalarna
- Péter Márki-Zay - politician, marketer, economist, electrical engineer, historian
- Konrád Nagy - speed skater and former short track speed skater
- Péter Galambos - rower
- Anita Köböl - television presenter
