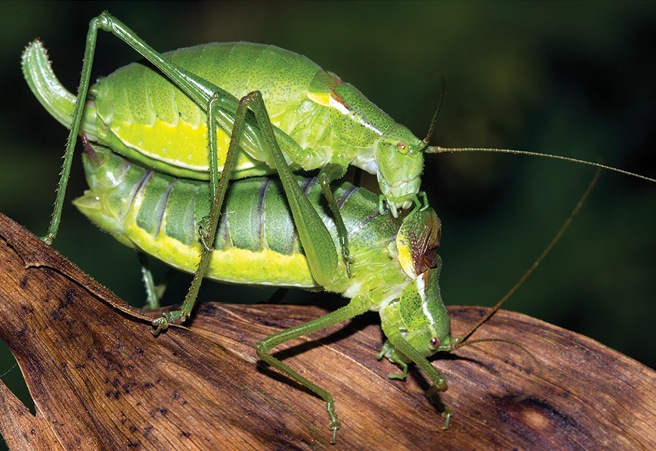
- Isophya dochia

Scientific classification
- Domain: Eukaryota
- Kingdom: Animalia
- Phylum: Arthropoda
- Class: Insecta
- Order: Orthoptera
- Suborder: Ensifera
- Family: Tettigoniidae
- Subfamily: Phaneropterinae
- Tribe: Barbitistini
- Genus: Isophya; Brunner von Wattenwyl, 1878

Type species
- Barbitistes pyrenaea Serville

Synonyms
- Isophia Passerin d'Entrèves, 1981; Isophyia; Jaquetia Saussure, 1898

= Isophya =

Genus of bush crickets

Isophya is a genus of bush crickets, in the tribe Barbitistini, found from mainland Europe to western Asia.

== Species ==
The Orthoptera Species File lists:

species group costata Brunner von Wattenwyl, 1878

1. Isophya boldyrevi Miram, 1938
2. Isophya costata Brunner von Wattenwyl, 1878
3. Isophya dobrogensis Kis, 1994
4. Isophya modestior Brunner von Wattenwyl, 1882
5. Isophya stepposa Bey-Bienko, 1954
6. Isophya stysi Cejchan, 1957

species group kraussii Brunner von Wattenwyl, 1878

1. Isophya brevicauda Ramme, 1931
2. Isophya kraussii Brunner von Wattenwyl, 1878
3. Isophya pienensis Maran, 1954
4. Isophya zubovskii Bey-Bienko, 1954

species group major Brunner von Wattenwyl, 1878

1. Isophya major Brunner von Wattenwyl, 1878
2. Isophya mavromoustakisi Uvarov, 1936
3. Isophya mersinensis Sevgili & Çiplak, 2006
4. Isophya salmani Sevgili & Heller, 2006

species group modesta (Frivaldszky, 1868)

1. Isophya andreevae Peshev, 1981
2. Isophya bureschi Peshev, 1959
3. Isophya clara Ingrisch & Pavićević, 2010
4. Isophya longicaudata Ramme, 1951
5. Isophya miksici Peshev, 1985
6. Isophya modesta (Frivaldszky, 1868)
7. Isophya plevnensis Peshev, 1985
8. Isophya rhodopensis Ramme, 1951
9. Isophya tosevski Pavićević, 1983
10. Isophya yaraligozi Ünal, 2003

species group pyrenaea (Serville, 1838)

1. Isophya altaica Bey-Bienko, 1926
2. Isophya beybienkoi Maran, 1958
3. Isophya brunneri Retowski, 1888
4. Isophya bucovinensis Iorgu, Iorgu, Szövényi & Orci, 2017
5. Isophya camptoxypha (Fieber, 1853)
6. Isophya ciucasi Iorgu & Iorgu, 2010
7. Isophya dochia Iorgu, 2012
8. Isophya doneciana Bey-Bienko, 1954
9. Isophya fatrensis Chládek, 2007
10. Isophya gulae Peshev, 1981
11. Isophya harzi Kis, 1960
12. Isophya nagyi Szövényi, Puskás & Orci, 2012
13. Isophya obtusa Brunner von Wattenwyl, 1882
14. Isophya posthumoidalis Bazyluk, 1971
15. Isophya pyrenaea (Serville, 1838) - type species (as Barbitistes pyrenaea Serville)
16. Isophya sicula Orci, Szovenyi & Nagy, 2010
17. Isophya taurica Brunner von Wattenwyl, 1878

species group rectipennis Brunner von Wattenwyl, 1878

1. Isophya cania Karabag, 1975
2. Isophya ilkazi Ramme, 1951
3. Isophya nervosa Ramme, 1931
4. Isophya pavelii Brunner von Wattenwyl, 1878
5. Isophya rectipennis Brunner von Wattenwyl, 1878
6. Isophya stenocauda Ramme, 1951
7. Isophya thracica Karabag, 1962
8. Isophya triangularis Brunner von Wattenwyl, 1891

species group schneideri Brunner von Wattenwyl, 1878

1. Isophya hakkarica Karabag, 1962
2. Isophya karabaghi Uvarov, 1940
3. Isophya schneideri Brunner von Wattenwyl, 1878

species group speciosa (Frivaldszky, 1868)

1. Isophya acuminata Brunner von Wattenwyl, 1878
2. Isophya amplipennis Brunner von Wattenwyl, 1878
3. Isophya artvin Ünal, 2010
4. Isophya bumerangoides Sevgili, Demirsoy & Çiplak, 2012
5. Isophya caspica Ramme, 1929
6. Isophya gracilis Miram, 1938
7. Isophya hitit Ünal, 2010
8. Isophya kalishevskii Adelung, 1907
9. Isophya nigrosignata Miram, 1938
10. Isophya pylnovi Miram, 1938
11. Isophya redtenbacheri Adelung, 1907
12. Isophya reticulata Ramme, 1951
13. Isophya rizeensis Sevgili, 2003
14. Isophya rodsjankoi Bolívar, 1899
15. Isophya savignyi Brunner von Wattenwyl, 1878
16. Isophya speciosa (Frivaldszky, 1868)
17. Isophya splendida Naskrecki & Ünal, 1995
18. Isophya sureyai Ramme, 1951
19. Isophya uludaghensis Sevgili & Heller, 2003

species group straubei (Fieber, 1853)

1. Isophya anatolica Ramme, 1951
2. Isophya hospodar (Saussure, 1898)
3. Isophya staneki Maran, 1958
4. Isophya straubei (Fieber, 1853)

species group zernovi Miram, 1938

1. Isophya autumnalis Karabag, 1962
2. Isophya bicarinata Karabag, 1957
3. Isophya bivittata Uvarov, 1921
4. Isophya horon Sevgili, 2018
5. Isophya karadenizensis Ünal, 2005
6. Isophya sonora Sevgili, 2020
7. Isophya zernovi Miram, 1938

species group not determined

1. Isophya hemiptera Bey-Bienko, 1954
2. Isophya kosswigi Demirsoy, 1974
3. Isophya lemnotica Werner, 1932
4. Isophya pancici Pavićević, 2017
5. Isophya radmilae Pavićević, 2017
6. Isophya sikorai Ramme, 1951
7. Isophya tartara (Saussure, 1898)
8. Isophya transcaucasica Ramme, 1930
