= Isophya harzi =

Conservation status
- Critically Endangered (IUCN 3.1)

Scientific classification
- Kingdom: Animalia
- Phylum: Arthropoda
- Class: Insecta
- Order: Orthoptera
- Suborder: Ensifera
- Family: Tettigoniidae
- Subfamily: Phaneropterinae
- Genus: Isophya
- Species: I. harzi

Binomial name
- Isophya harzi Kis, 1960

Species of cricket-like animal

Isophya harzi is a species of insect in the family Tettigoniidae. It is found only in Romania.
