= Everybody's Hungary People's Party =

Hungarian political part

Everybody's Hungary People's Party Mindenki Magyarországa Néppárt
- Abbreviation: MMN
- Chairman: Péter Márki-Zay
- Presidium: Katalin Lukácsi; Zoltán Kész; György Magyar; Róbert Lengyel; László Tikk; Gábor Üveges
- Vice Chairman: Zoltán Kész; György Magyar
- Founder: Péter Márki-Zay
- Founded: 10 November 2018
- Registered: 16 September 2023
- Youth wing: Everybody's Hungary Youth
- Local units: Kossuth Circles
- Membership: ▲6,000
- Ideology: Conservatism; Liberal conservatism Christian democracy Economic liberalism Pro-Europeanism
- Political position: Centre-right
- National affiliation: Talpra Magyarok; United for Hungary (formerly)
- European affiliation: European Democratic Party
- Colours: Blue
- Slogan: "Only upwards!" (Hungarian: "Csak felfelé!")
- National Assembly: 0 / 199 (0%)
- European Parliament: 0 / 21 (0%)
- County Assemblies: 0 / 381
- General Assembly of Budapest: 0 / 33

Party flag
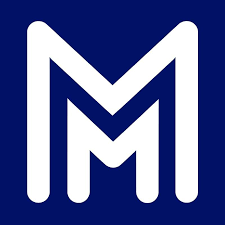

Website
- mmnp.hu

The Everybody's Hungary People's Party (Hungarian: Mindenki Magyarországa Néppárt, MMN), previously known as Everybody's Hungary Movement, (Note: Sometimes also translated as Everyone's Hungary Movement or Movement for a Hungary of Everyone.) (Hungarian: Mindenki Magyarországa Mozgalom) is a Hungarian political party established to foster independent opposition and alternatives to Fidesz candidates in local elections. The Movement, which did not describe itself initially as a political party until 16 September 2023, was founded by Péter Márki-Zay and associates in 2018 as a means of fostering cooperation between Hungary's fractured opposition parties. Márki-Zay won the mayoralty of Hódmezővásárhely in 2018. In 2021, Márki-Zay became the candidate of the United for Hungary to challenge Viktor Orbán in the 2022 parliamentary election, which he lost. The party joined the European Democratic Party in November 2025.

== Ideology ==
It has a 12-point platform, including the rule of law, freedom of the press, alignment with the West (as opposed to with Vladimir Putin), entry into the eurozone and protection of the borders against illegal immigration.

== Election results ==
=== European Parliament ===
Election	List leader	Votes	%	Seats	+/−	EP Group
2024	Péter Márki-Zay	29,285	0.64 (#10)	0 / 21	New	−
