= Katalin Lukácsi =

Hungarian politician

Personal details
- Born: Katalin Mária Lukácsi; 2 October 1987 (age 39) Jászberény, Hungary
- Party: Independent (2017–present)
- Other political affiliations: KDNP (2011–2017); MMM (2018–present); United for Hungary (2020–present)
- Education: Theological College of Eger; Budapest University of Jewish Studies; Eötvös Loránd University
- Profession: Politician; historian; catechist; community organizer; researcher
- Website: Katalin Lukácsi website

Katalin Mária Lukácsi (born 2 October 1987) is a Hungarian politician, historian, catechist, community organizer and researcher. She has been a member of the presidium of the Everybody's Hungary Movement since 2018. Between 2011 and 2017, she was a member of the Christian Democratic People's Party. She also supported Fidesz from 2010 to 2017.

Katalin Lukácsi giving a speech at Kossuth Square (excerpt)
