= István Almási =

Hungarian teacher and politician

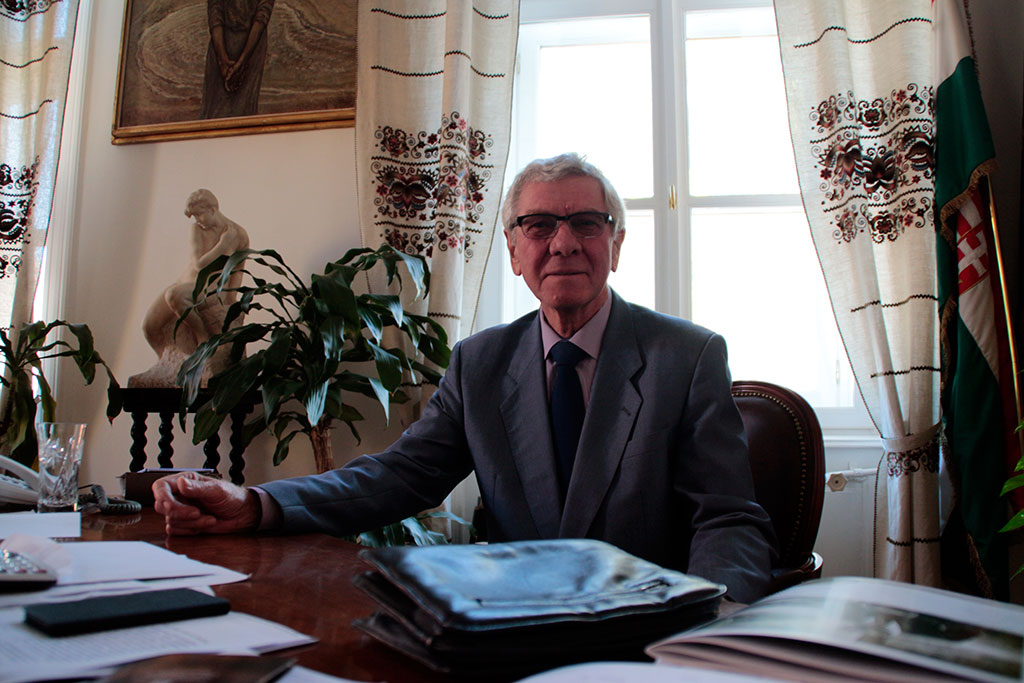
- István Almási in 2015

Mayor of Hódmezővásárhely
- In office 6 September 2012 – 20 November 2017
- Preceded by: János Lázár
- Succeeded by: Péter Márki-Zay

Personal details
- Born: 12 July 1944 Elek, Kingdom of Hungary
- Died: 20 November 2017 (aged 73) Hódmezővásárhely, Hungary
- Party: KDNP
- Spouse: Enikő Sáfár
- Children: 3

István Almási (12 July 1944 – 20 November 2017) was a Hungarian teacher and politician who served as mayor of Hódmezővásárhely from 2012 until his death in 2017.

Almási died in office on 20 November 2017 at the age of 73.

== Personal life ==
He was married to Enikő Sáfár, with whom he had two sons, Attila and Zoltán, and a daughter, Enikő.

Political offices
| Preceded by János Lázár | Mayor of Hódmezővásárhely; 2012–2017 | Succeeded by Péter Márki-Zay |
