= András Rapcsák =

Hungarian politician (1943–2002)

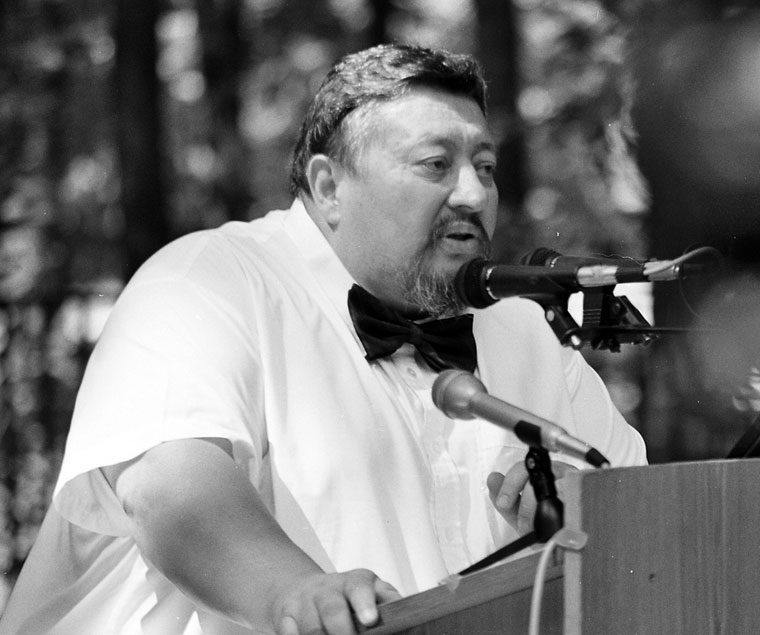
- András Rapcsák in 1997

Mayor of Hódmezővásárhely
- In office 6 November 1990 – 3 February 2002
- Preceded by: Aranka Csizmadia
- Succeeded by: János Lázár

Personal details
- Born: 14 July 1943 Debrecen, Hungary
- Died: 3 February 2002 (aged 58) Hódmezővásárhely, Hungary
- Party: KDNP, Fidesz

András Rapcsák (14 July 1943 – 3 February 2002) was a Hungarian engineer and politician who served as mayor of Hódmezővásárhely from 1990 until his death. He was succeeded by his deputy mayor János Lázár. He had been a member of the National Assembly of Hungary since 1994.

He died of pulmonary embolism on 3 February 2002, few months before the next parliamentary election.

Political offices
Preceded by Aranka Csizmadia	Mayor of Hódmezővásárhely; 1990–2002	Succeeded by János Lázár
