= János Tornyai =

Hungarian painter (1869–1936)

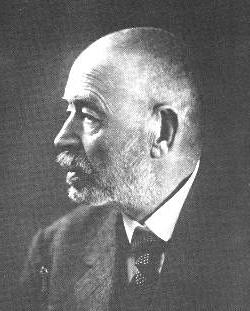
- Born: János Tornyai; 18 January 1869; Hódmezővásárhely, Hungary
- Died: 20 September 1936 (aged 67); Hódmezővásárhely
- Known for: Painter
- Movement: Realism; Post-Impressionism

János Tornyai (January 18, 1869 – September 20, 1936) was a renowned Hungarian painter born in Hódmezővásárhely.

== Early life ==
Tornyai, the son of day labourers, studied at the School of Decorative Art in 1886–1888, then a guest pupil of Bertalan Székely, Károly Lotz and János Greguss in 1888–89. He studied at the Académie Julian in Paris from 1894 where he was influenced by Mihály Munkácsy's art. He visited Germany and Italy in 1897, then returned to Hódmezővásárhely.

He had hardly enough to keep body and soul together, and had a studio from 1903 only. He started to collect folklore products together with Gyula Rudnay and Béla Endre and they founded a school in Hódmezővásárhely to save folk pottery. He lived in Mártély from the 1910s onwards where he painted a series of landscapes on the Great Plain. He moved to Budapest in 1919. He worked in Szentendre for a few months in 1933–34.

First he was Munkácsy's follower in portraying peasants' lives. His major works from this period "Rákóczi in Rodostó", 1904, "The Outlaw's Love", 1907, and "Miklós Nagy Bercsényi", 1908. "Heritage" inspired him to paint landscapes with delicate colours ("Well-Sweep", "Hungarian Fate", etc.). In his late Szentendre period, colours became lighter and he was engaged in plein air ("Woman in Green Coat", 1932–34, etc.).

He became interested in the Great Plain around 1904 and from then on he made several pictures of farmsteads with violent brushwork and sweeping style. Hódmezővásárhely was the place he always returned to after his journeys to Budapest, Paris and Szentendre, and he spent his last years nearby, in Mártély; very peaceful and productive years. In 1984, 718 pictures were found under the floor of his studio. Now these pictures are in the Tornyai Museum of Hódmezővásárhely.

== Gallery ==
=== Realistic style ===
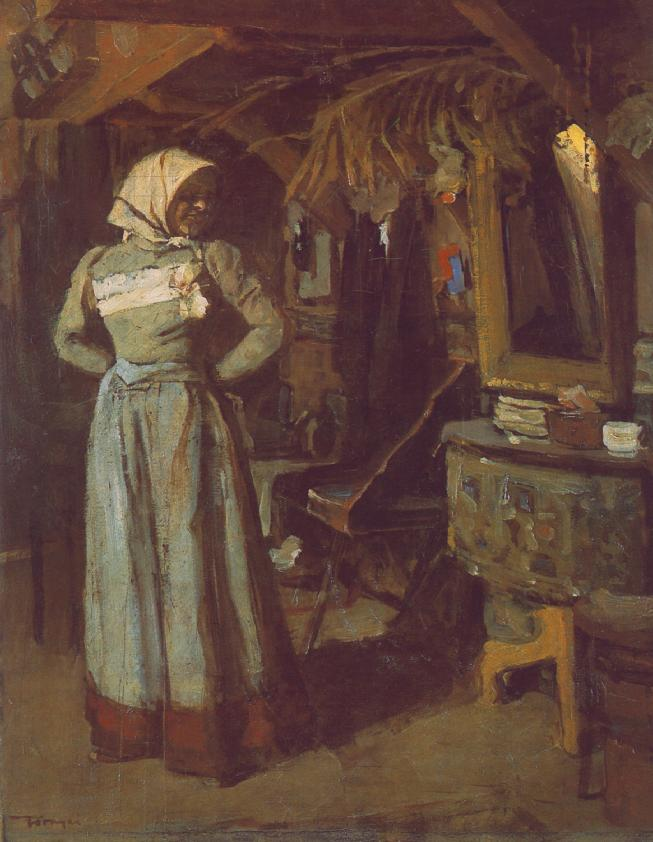
Young peasant woman in the studio (1904)

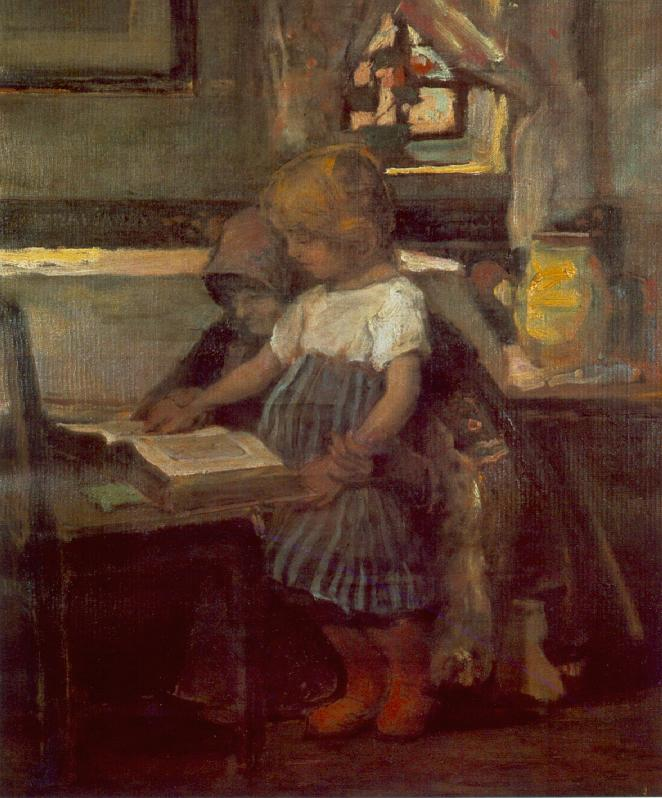
Lesson on the Farm (1896)

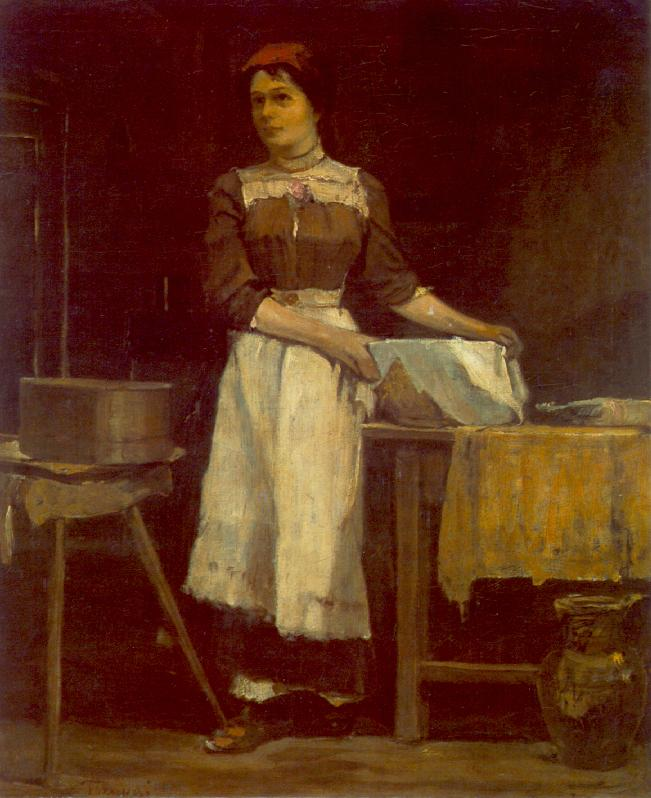
Bolting girl (c. 1900)

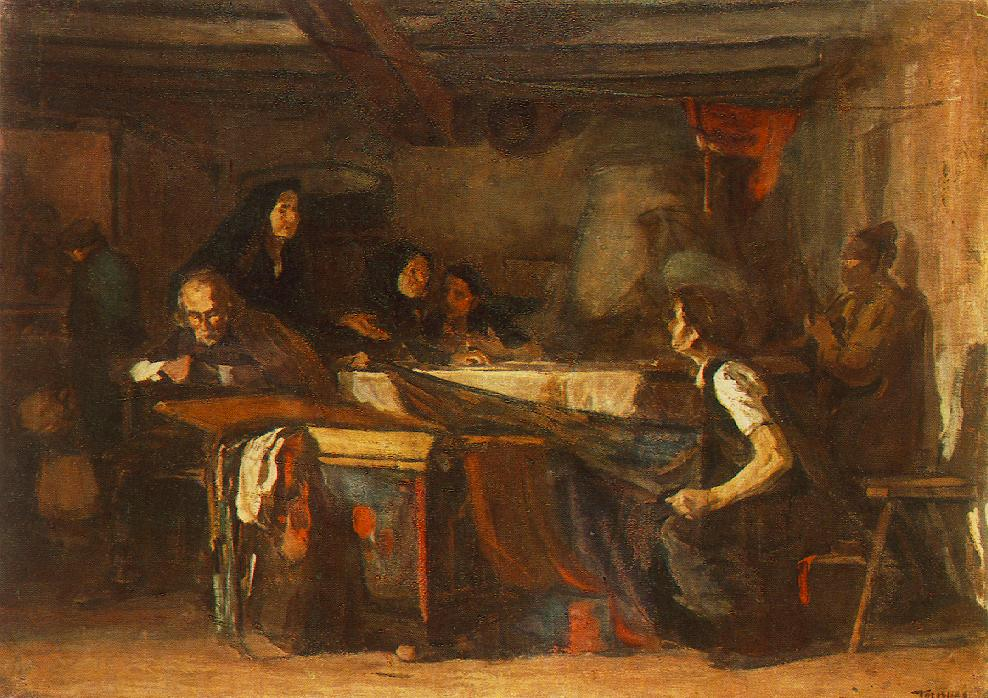
The Legacy (1920)

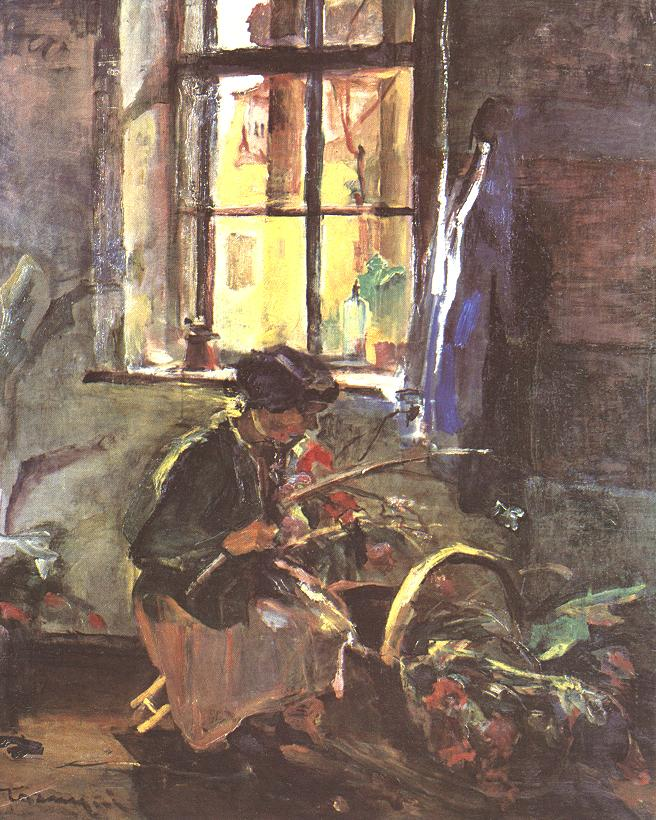
Making a buch of flowers (1933)

=== Landscapes ===
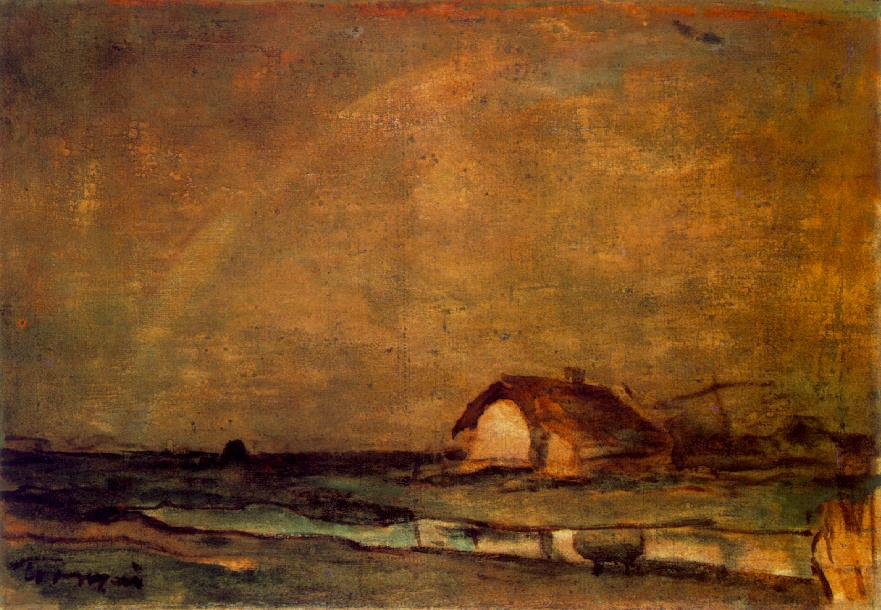
Farm on the Great Hungarian Plain (c. 1910)

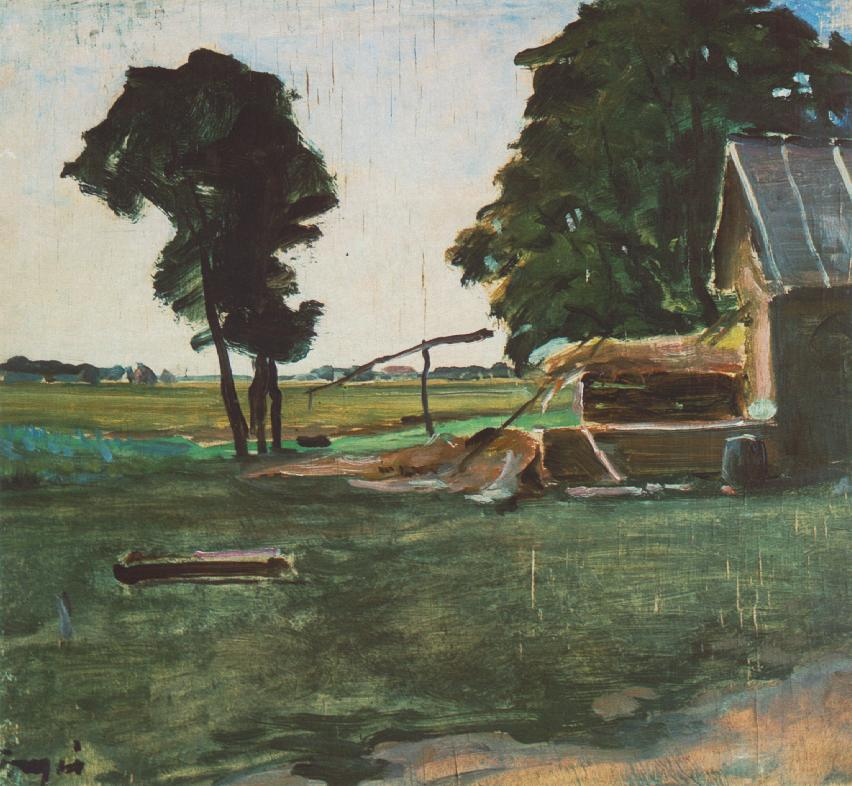
Farm with shadoof (1907)

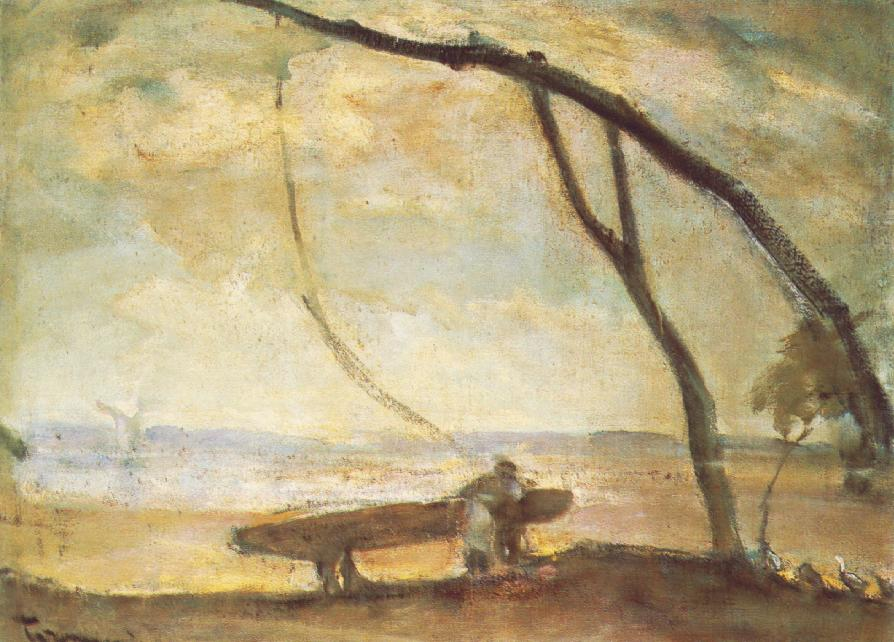
Shadoof with looming (1910)

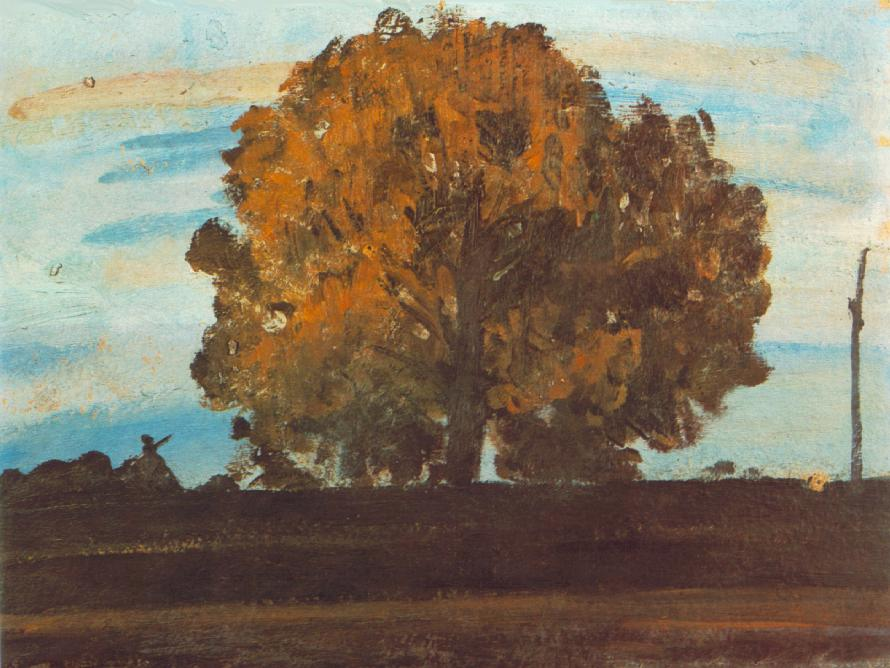
Great tree at Mártély (1910)

=== Post-Nagybánya style ===
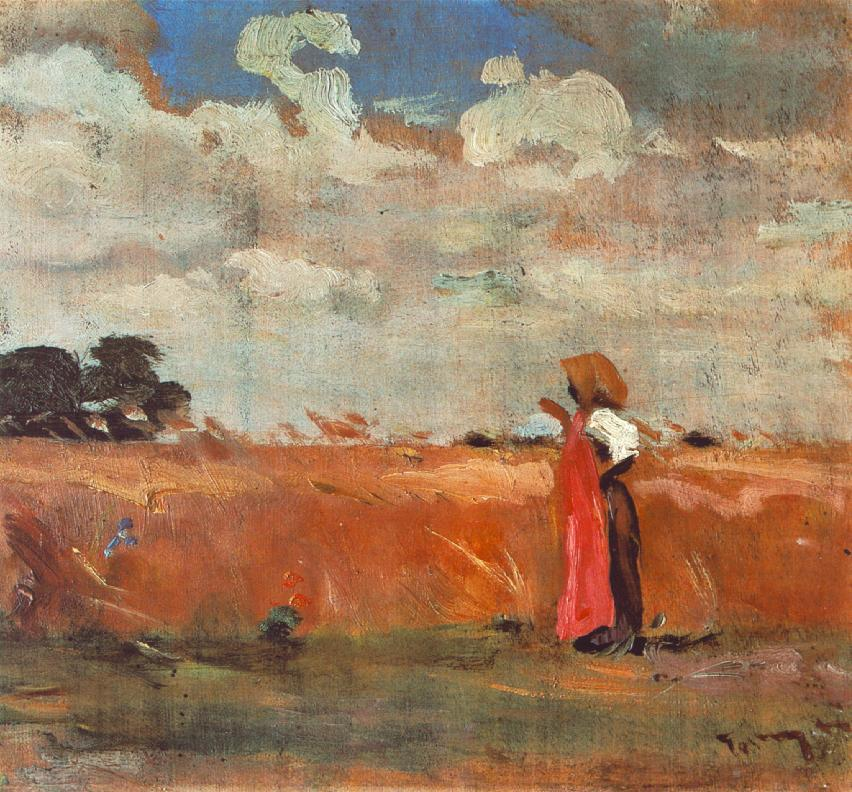
Wheatland with woman of shawl (1912)

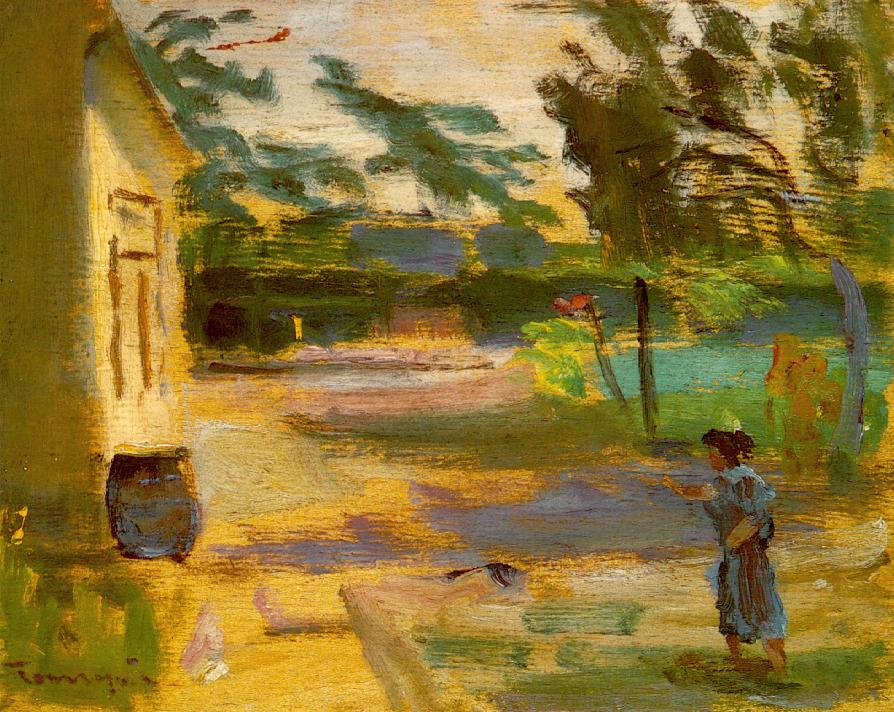
Courtyard in Sunshine (1928)

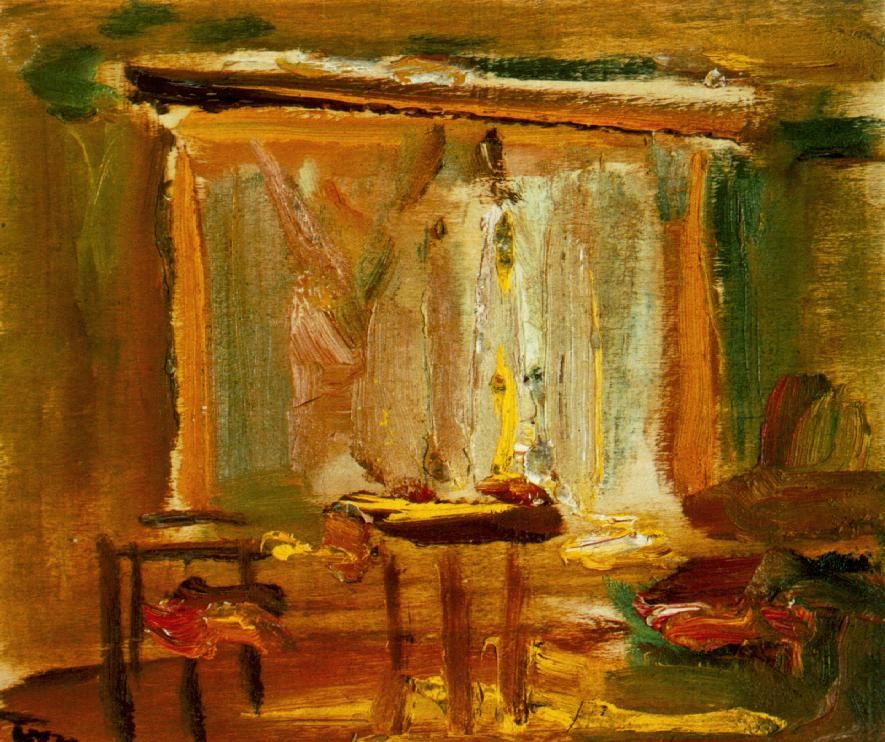
Interior with Curtained Window (1929)

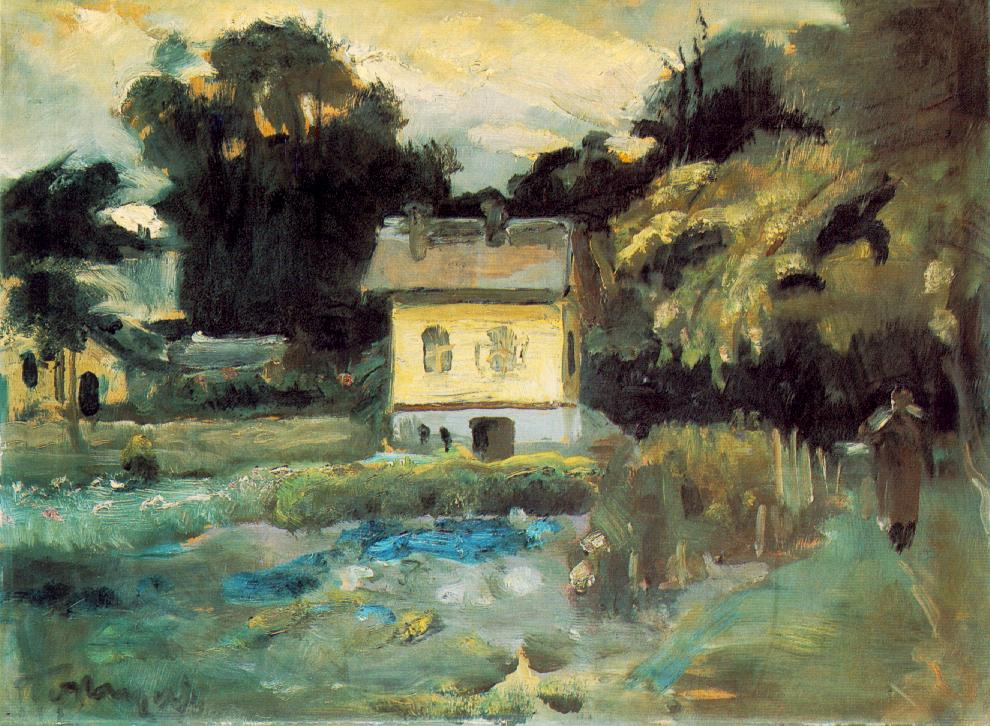
View at Szentendre (1933)

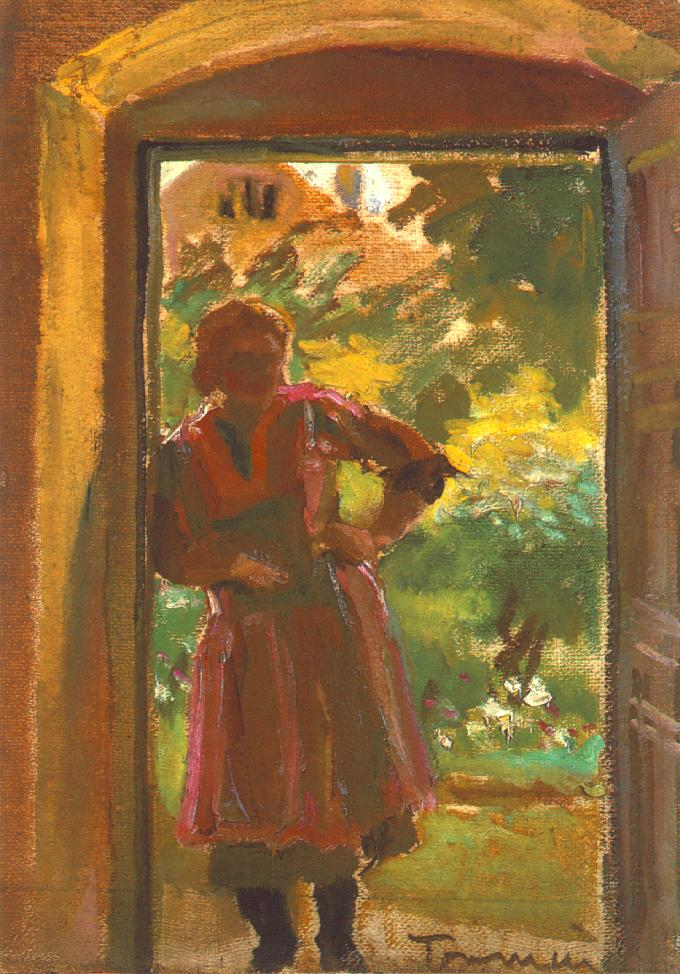
Woman Standing in a Door (c. 1933–34)

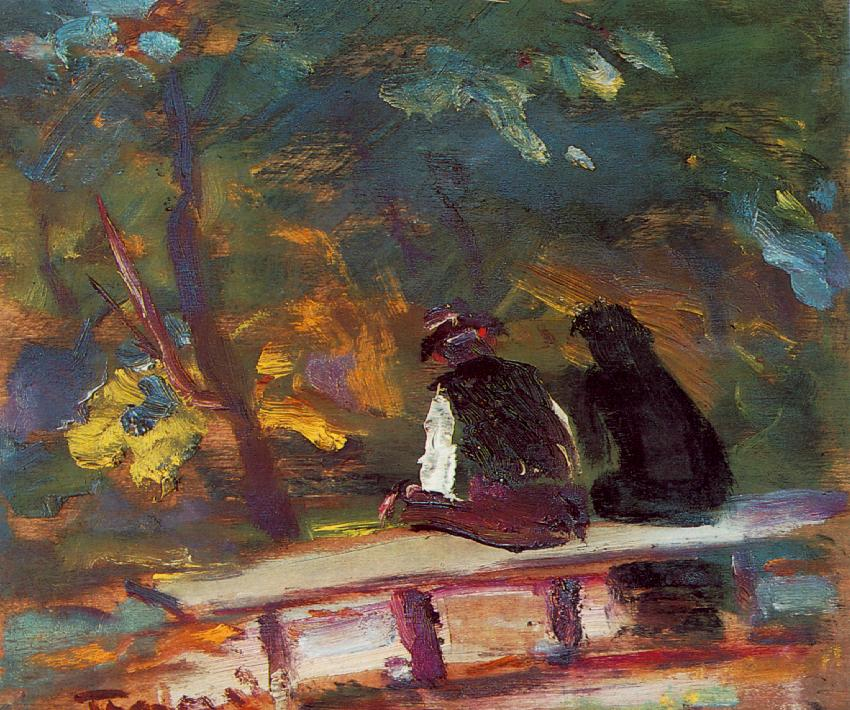
On the Bench (1933–34)

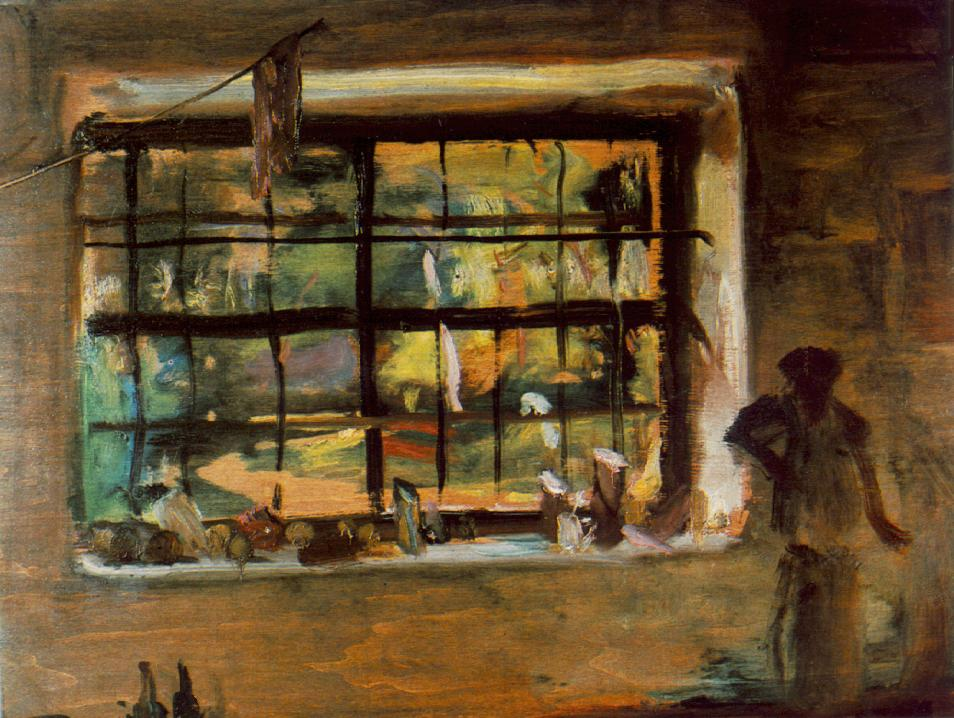
Window of the Atelier (1934)

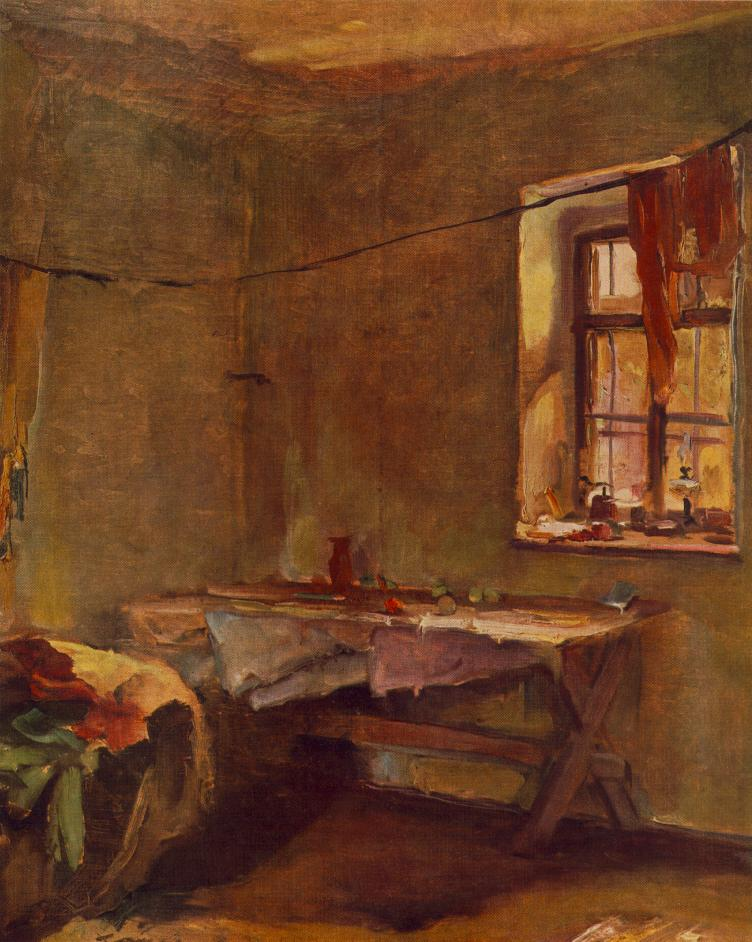
Interior (1934)
