= Ede Kallós =

Hungarian sculptor

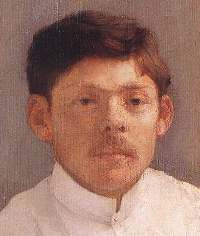
- Portrait painted by Károly Ferenczy (c. 1896), in the Museum of Fine Arts, Budapest.
- Born: 1866; Hódmezővásárhely, Kingdom of Hungary, Austrian Empire
- Died: 1950 (aged 83–84); Budapest, Hungary
- Known for: His art for tombs
- Notable work: Ferenc Erkel Memorial
- Style: Realism
- Movement: Academism

Ede Kallós (born Éliás Klein; February 17, 1866 in Hódmezővásárhely – March 11, 1950 in Budapest) was a Hungarian sculptor of Jewish heritage. His sculptural style integrated elements of realism and academism style mainly engaged in creating art for tombs.

== Life ==
Born in Hódmezővásárhely, Kallós studied in Budapest and Paris and his first major work was the statue "Dávid".

His portrait was painted by Károly Ferenczy.

Kallós died in 1950 in Budapest.
