= János Lázár =

Hungarian politician

János Lázár MP
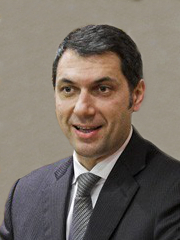
- Lázár in 2010

Minister of Construction and Investment / Minister of Construction and Transport
- In office 24 May 2022 – 12 May 2026
- Prime Minister: Viktor Orbán
- Preceded by: Office established
- Succeeded by: Dávid Vitézy (as Minister of Transport and Investment)

Minister of the Prime Minister’s Office
- In office 6 June 2014 – 17 May 2018
- Prime Minister: Viktor Orbán
- Preceded by: himself as Secretary of State
- Succeeded by: Gergely Gulyás

Secretary of State of the Prime Minister’s Office
- In office 2 June 2012 – 6 June 2014
- Preceded by: Mihály Varga
- Succeeded by: himself as Minister

Mayor of Hódmezővásárhely
- In office 20 October 2002 – 6 September 2012
- Preceded by: András Rapcsák
- Succeeded by: István Almási

Member of the National Assembly
- In office 15 May 2002 – 20 August 2026

Personal details
- Born: 19 February 1975 (age 51) Hódmezővásárhely, Hungary
- Party: Fidesz
- Spouse: Dr Zita Lázárné Megyeri
- Children: 2
- Education: József Attila University of Sciences
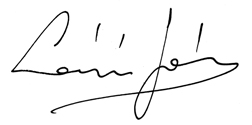
- Signature

János Lázár (born 19 February 1975) is a Hungarian politician and former Member of Parliament. He was former leader of the Fidesz parliamentary group (2010–2012) and State Secretary, then Minister of Prime Minister's Office (2012–2018) in the cabinets of Viktor Orbán. In this capacity, he was regarded as de facto the second most powerful member of the cabinet, but lost political influence by 2018. He also served as Mayor of Hódmezővásárhely from 2002 to 2012.

== Career ==
He started his career as a law apprentice at city council of Hódmezővásárhely in 1995. He was personal secretary at the Hungarian Parliament at 1999. He joined Fidesz in 2000. He became both a Parliament representative and mayor of Hódmezővásárhely in 2002, following the death of his mentor András Rapcsák. In 2002, he became a member of the Christian Democratic People's Party (KDNP) too.

He became leader of the Fidesz parliamentary group after the 2010 election, succeeding Tibor Navracsics in this position.

Lázár was appointed Secretary of State of Prime Minister's Office on 2 June 2012, as a result he resigned from the office of mayor of Hódmezővásárhely. He was replaced by Antal Rogán as head of the Fidesz parliamentary group on that day. Lázár was elected one of the four vice-presidents of Fidesz in September 2013, replacing Mihály Varga. He held that party office until December 2015. Lázár was promoted to Minister of the Prime Minister's Office following the 2014 parliamentary election an held this office until 2018. On 27 July 2020 he was elected President of the Hungarian Tennis Association.

In the parliamentary elections of 2022, he won an individual mandate in the Csongrád-Csanád constituency No. 4, and thus re-entered the Parliament. After the elections, it was announced that he would become Minister of Construction and Investment in the fifth Orbán government. Following a government restructuring after László Palkovics' resignation as minister (November 2022), the profile of his ministry was expanded on 1 December 2022, and its name was changed to Minister of Construction and Transport.

== Controversies ==
On 18 November 2010 János Lázár strongly criticized the former President of the Constitutional Court of Hungary, László Sólyom in an interview published in Népszabadság.

In March 2011 In the recording posted on the Internet, Lázár as mayor of Hódmezővásárhely could be heard telling the city council in 2008 that "those people who have nothing are worth just that". Addressing a press conference, Lázár said, '"I would like to apologise to Hungary for my ambiguous and misunderstood statement. I would like to apologise to all who feel hurt by that".

He said that his remark had not referred to the poor but to those who were unsuccessful in their profession but embarked on a political career merely with the purpose of making a livelihood and for financial gains. Lázár also said the remarks were parts of a longer speech and out of their original context. The three opposition parties slammed the senior Fidesz official for his remarks. Lázár sued the journals, which had claimed that he used these words in connection with the poor. The verdict of the Court of the city of Eger found that Lázár was right, and the record was manipulated.

On 12 May 2014, Hungarian news website Origo published an article about his travels on the Hungarian government's budget, which led Lázár to pay back 2 million forints to the state budget. On 2 June, the lead editor of the website was fired, allegedly under pressure from Lázár, who denied being involved in the decision.

In March 2018 just before the 2018 Hungarian parliamentary election, Lázár posted an anti-immigration video about Vienna. In the video he said that migrants made Vienna dirty and poor and that in 20 years Budapest could look like Vienna if the Hungarian opposition won the elections.

In early 2026 his comment that Romani people should work as toilet cleaners caused a nationwide scandal.

== Personal life ==
He is married. His wife is Dr Zita Lázárné Megyeri. They have two sons.

Political offices
Preceded by András Rapcsák	Mayor of Hódmezővásárhely; 2002–2012	Succeeded by István Almási
Preceded by Mihály Varga	Minister of the Prime Minister's Office; 2012–2018	Succeeded by Gergely Gulyás
National Assembly of Hungary
Preceded by Tibor Navracsics	Leader of the Fidesz parliamentary group 2010–2012	Succeeded by Antal Rogán
Sporting positions
Preceded by Lajos Szűcs	President of the Hungarian Tennis Association; 27 July 2020 –	Succeeded by Incumbent
