= Péter Márki-Zay =

Hungarian politician (born 1972)

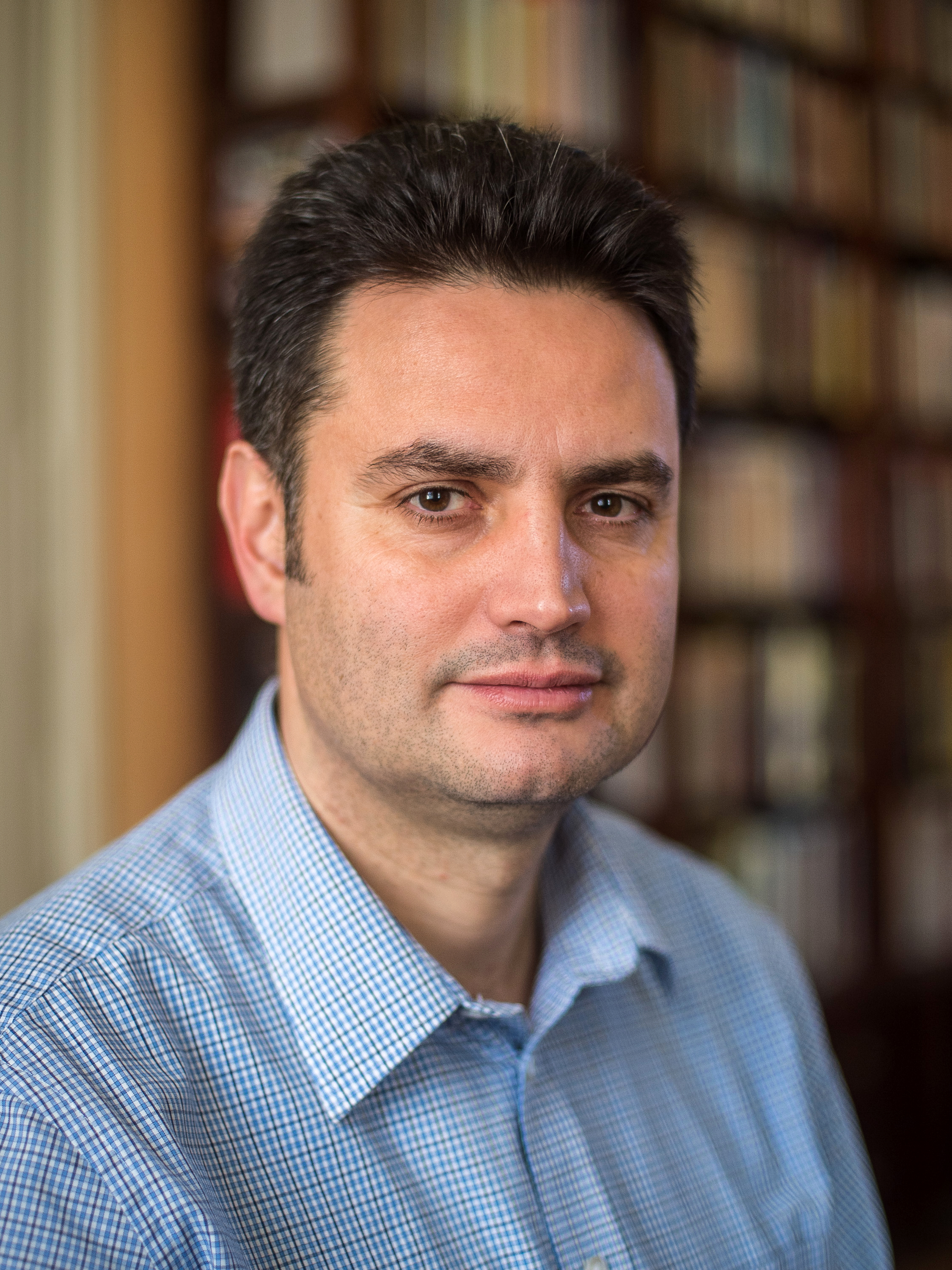
- Márki-Zay in 2018

Mayor of Hódmezővásárhely
- Incumbent
- Assumed office 3 March 2018
- Preceded by: István Almási

Personal details
- Born: 9 May 1972 (age 54) Hódmezővásárhely, Hungary
- Party: Everybody's Hungary People's Party (2023–present)
- Other political affiliations: Everybody's Hungary Movement (2018–present)
- Spouse: Felícia Lilla Vincze (m. 1994)
- Children: 7
- Parent: János Márki-Zay (father)
- Education: Budapest Business School (BA); Corvinus University of Budapest (MSc); Óbuda University (BSc); Pázmány Péter Catholic University (PhD); University of Szeged (MEd)
- Profession: Politician; marketer; economist; electrical engineer; historian
- Website: markizaypeter.hu

Péter Márki-Zay (Note: Hungarian pronunciation: [ˈpeːtɛr ˈmaːrkizɒji]) (born 9 May 1972), often referred to by his initials MZP, is a Hungarian politician, marketer, economist, electrical engineer, and historian. He has served as mayor of Hódmezővásárhely since 2018, and is the co-founder of the Everybody's Hungary (Mindenki Magyarországa Mozgalom/Néppárt; MMM/MMN). As the winner of the 2021 Hungarian opposition primary, he was the candidate of the United for Hungary challenging Prime Minister Viktor Orbán in the 2022 Hungarian parliamentary election, which he lost.

== Early life and career ==
=== Childhood and education ===
Márki-Zay was born in Hódmezővásárhely, in the Hungarian People's Republic, on 9 May 1972, to a mother who was a chemist and a father who was a physics teacher. He grew up in a conservative and religious family. His great-grandfather was the principal of the Calvinist grammar school of Hódmezővásárhely. Márki-Zay graduated from the Bethlen Gábor Calvinist Grammar School (Bethlen Gábor Református Gimnázium) at Hódmezővásárhely in 1990.

From 1990 to 1993, Márki-Zay attended the College of Commerce and Hospitality (Kereskedelmi és Vendéglátóipari Főiskola) at Budapest, where he studied marketing, then the University of Economics of Budapest (Budapesti Közgazdaságtudományi Egyetem) from 1993 to 1996, where he studied economics. Between 1997 and 2001, he studied electrical engineering at the Technical College of Budapest (Budapesti Műszaki Főiskola). In 2002, he also obtained a degree in history from the University of Szeged (Szegedi Tudományegyetem). He also studied the history of economics at Pázmány Péter Catholic University (Pázmány Péter Katolikus Egyetem) from 2000 and 2005, and graduated as a Doctor of Philosophy in 2006.

=== Early career ===
Between 1996 and 2004, Márki-Zay first worked at DÉMÁSZ, which was at the time responsible for supplying electricity to Southern Hungary, then at Kontavill-Legrand as an economist and marketing manager. In 2004, he moved to Canada, with his wife Felícia and their five children. There, he first worked as a door-to-door salesman for a phone service provider, then at the marketing department of Carquest. After about two and a half years, the family moved to Indiana, United States, where he continued to work for Carquest. Between 2008 and 2009, he was a member of the Eastern Indiana Regional Workforce Board. In 2009, the family returned to Hódmezővásárhely, together with their two youngest children, who were born abroad.

In Hódmezővásárhely, Márki-Zay worked at the electricity supplier of Szeged, first in strategical planning, then leading customer service. In 2013, he became a member of the Hungarian Electrotechnical Association (Magyar Elektrotechnikai Egyesület). Between 2016 and 2017, he was the leader of marketing and domestic logistics at Legrand Hungary. Until 2014, he taught nonprofit and business marketing at the University of Szeged (Szegedi Tudományegyetem).

== Political career ==
In 2018, Márki-Zay announced that he would be running as an independent candidate in the Hódmezővásárhely mayoral by-election. His candidacy was initially supported by three opposition parties, the Hungarian Socialist Party, Politics Can Be Different and Jobbik; Momentum and the Democratic Coalition endorsed him a few days later. Márki-Zay said that he did not sympathise with the views of any of the parties supporting him, describing himself as a right-wing Christian, and a disappointed Fidesz voter.

Despite the historically unprecedented unity of the opposition parties backing him, his candidacy was initially seen as a long-shot by many observers, owing to Fidesz's popularity in the city, as well as Márki-Zay's political inexperience. On 25 February 2018, he defeated Zoltán Hegedűs by 13,076 votes to 9,468, becoming the city's first non-Fidesz mayor since 1990. He assumed office on 3 March, with Andrea Kis from the Hungarian Socialist Party as his deputy mayor. Following his success, Márki-Zay continued to advocate for a nationwide unity between opposition parties. In 2018, he founded the non-partisan Everybody's Hungary Movement (Mindenki Magyarországa Mozgalom; MMM) in order to further cooperation between opposition parties, and to support representative democracy.

During his first term as a mayor, Márki-Zay vowed to fight for transparency. He revealed that the city was in a much worse financial situation than previously reported. He also made the donations to the city's sports clubs public and revealed that the city's previous leadership regularly failed to pay overtime to their workers. However, his time was not without controversy. He was fined for libel on multiple occasions and ordered to remove a "migrant counter" he placed inside the city hall.

In 2019, Márki-Zay ran for reelection, this time under the banner of MMM, as well as the Organisation for a Clean Vásárhely (Tiszta Vásárhelyért Egyesület). His candidacy was once again supported by all major opposition parties. He defeated the Fidesz-backed independent candidate István Grezsa by 13,478 votes to 10,042, earning him a second term as the city's mayor. In 2021, Márki-Zay announced his intent to run as a candidate for Prime Minister under the banner of the Hungarian opposition. In the first round of the primaries, Márki-Zay came in third place with 20.43% of the vote, placing behind Klára Dobrev and Gergely Karácsony. Karácsony of the PM–MSZP–LMP coalition withdrew before the run-off announcing his support for Márki-Zay. On 17 October, Márki-Zay won the run-off with 56.7% of the vote. Therefore, in the 2022 election, Márki-Zay will be the leader and Prime Ministerial candidate of the United for Hungary political alliance. Also in 2021, he was named one of the 28 most influential people in Europe, in the "Dreamers" section, by Politico Europe. In early 2022, he tested positive for COVID-19 amid the election campaign.

== Political positions ==
Márki-Zay has described himself as a right-wing Christian and a disappointed Fidesz voter. He supports increased European integration including introducing the euro currency and joining the European Public Prosecutor's Office, as well as being in favour of Hungary remaining in NATO. He stated that, if elected in April, he will introduce a new constitution to restore the rule of law and to introduce same-sex marriage.

Márki-Zay attacked Orbán for his social measures, which he considers to be liberticidal, labelling some of his government's actions xenophobic and homophobic, such as the 2022 Hungarian LGBTQ in education referendum, and has been described as supporting LGBT rights. He accused the Prime Minister of "organising immigration" and said that it was "in Fidesz", the ruling party, that "we find the most gay people", suggesting that Orbán's son shared this sexual orientation. He declared to be in favour of abortion rights.

At a rally, Márki-Zay argued that liberal, secular voters could feel comfortable voting for him, adding "Jesus Christ was also a left-wing person". Perceived as a neoliberal on economic issues, he opposes raising the minimum wage, believing that the market would be able to regulate salaries, and reforming the tax system. In a press interview in November 2021, he explained that "for the time being, it is in Hungary's interest to be a tax haven", with a corporate tax rate of 9%.

== Everybody's Hungary People's Party (MMN) ==
On 18 May 2022, Péter Márki-Zay announced, he is establishing his own political party, the Citizens Party. On 10 January 2023, Péter Márki-Zay enrolled his own political party's new name, which is Everybody's Hungary People's Party. The party registered in June 2023.

== Personal life ==
As of 2021, Márki-Zay is married to Felícia Lilla Vincze, a physicist, midwife, and doula. They have seven children: Ferenc (born 1996), Lilla (born 1997), Teodóra (born 1999), Gellért (born 2000), Emma (born 2003), Lóránt (born 2005), and Pál (born 2009). The family considers itself practising Roman Catholic, even though Márki-Zay is at odds with dogmatic Church teachings on marriage and abortion. He is a dual national, holding both Hungarian and Canadian citizenship. He is fluent in English, German, and French but can also converse in Spanish, Russian, Romanian, and Finnish.

== Bibliography ==
- Kálmán, Olga (26 June 2019). Szeretemország – Beszélgetőkönyv Márki-Zay Péterrel (in Hungarian). Budapest: Athenaeum. ISBN 9789632939308.

Political offices
Preceded by István Almási	Mayor of Hódmezővásárhely; 2018–present	Incumbent
