= Hódmezővásárhely =

- City with county rights
- Hódmezővásárhely Megyei Jogú Város
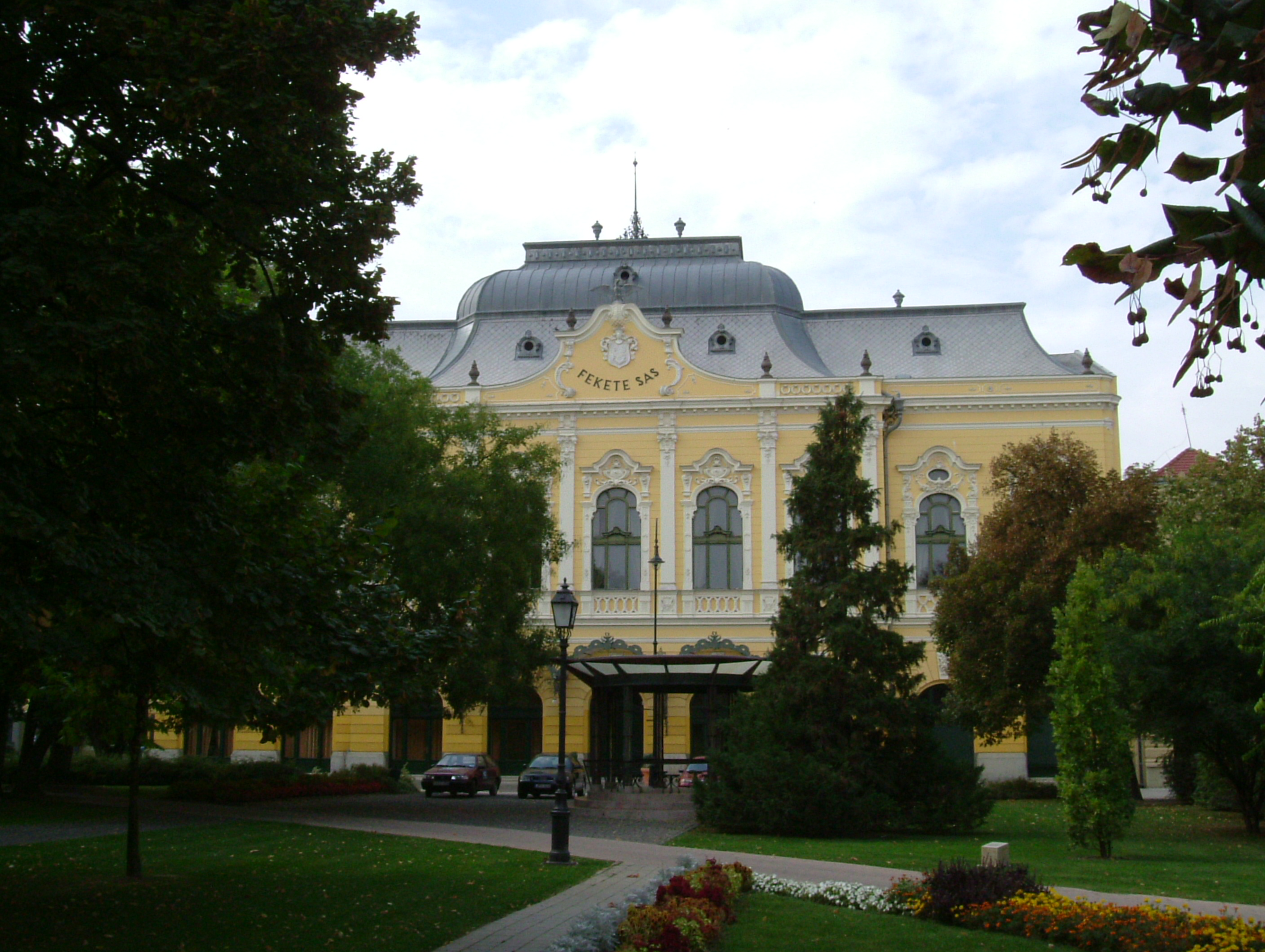
- Hotel Black Eagle

- Flag Coat of arms
- Nickname: Peasant Paris
- Location of Hódmezővásárhely Hódmezővásárhely (Hungary)
- Coordinates: 46.43039°N 20.31881°E
- Country: Hungary
- County: Csongrád-Csanád
- District: Hódmezővásárhely

Government
  - Mayor: Péter Márki-Zay (Independent)

Area
  - Total: 487.98 km^{2} (188.41 sq mi)

Population (2017)
  - Total: 44,009 ▼
  - Density: 97.87/km^{2} (253.5/sq mi)
- Time zone: UTC+1 (CET)
  - Summer (DST): UTC+2 (CEST)
- Postal code: 6800
- Area code: (+36) 62
- Website: hodmezovasarhely.hu

Hódmezővásárhely (Hungarian pronunciation: [ˈhoːdmɛzøːvaːʃaːrhɛj]; also known by other alternative names) is a city with county rights in southeast Hungary, on the Great Hungarian Plain, at the meeting point of the Békés-Csanádi Ridge and the clay grassland surrounding the river Tisza. In 2017, it had a population of 44,009.

Hódmezővásárhely is a member of Cittaslow.

== Etymology and names ==
The city's name, which literally translates as Beavers' Field Marketplace, was first mentioned after the unification of two Árpád-era villages, Hód and Vásárhely, the former getting its name from Beaver's lake, an apocope of Hód-tó (now one of the city's districts and the canal Hód-tavi-csatorna) and the latter coming from the mediaeval legal term marking settlements with the right of hosting markets and literally meaning market town. The middle term mező, which also refers to the city's state as an oppidum, a city with certain rights that are given by its feudal ruler, was later added to the town and to its name.

The city is also known by alternative names in other languages: Croatian: Vašrelj; Romanian: Ionești; and Serbian: Вашархељ, romanized: Vašarhelj; Slovak: Trhovište pri Segedíne.

== History ==
=== Prehistory ===
There is evidence of human habitation close to the modern town dating back 6,000 years, and archaeological evidence suggests that the area has been continuously inhabited since then by a variety of different cultures. Neolithic dwellings recessed into the ground stored domestic items such as plates, as well as the Kökénydombi Vénusz fertility symbol. Remains have also been found from the Copper Age, Bronze Age, Iron Age and the great migrations period. The town's archaeological treasures can now be seen at the permanent archaeological exhibition of the Tornyai János Museum.

=== Medieval period ===
At the end of the 8th century, the Avars found mostly remnants of the nomadic population and of the agrarian and animal-breeding Slavs.

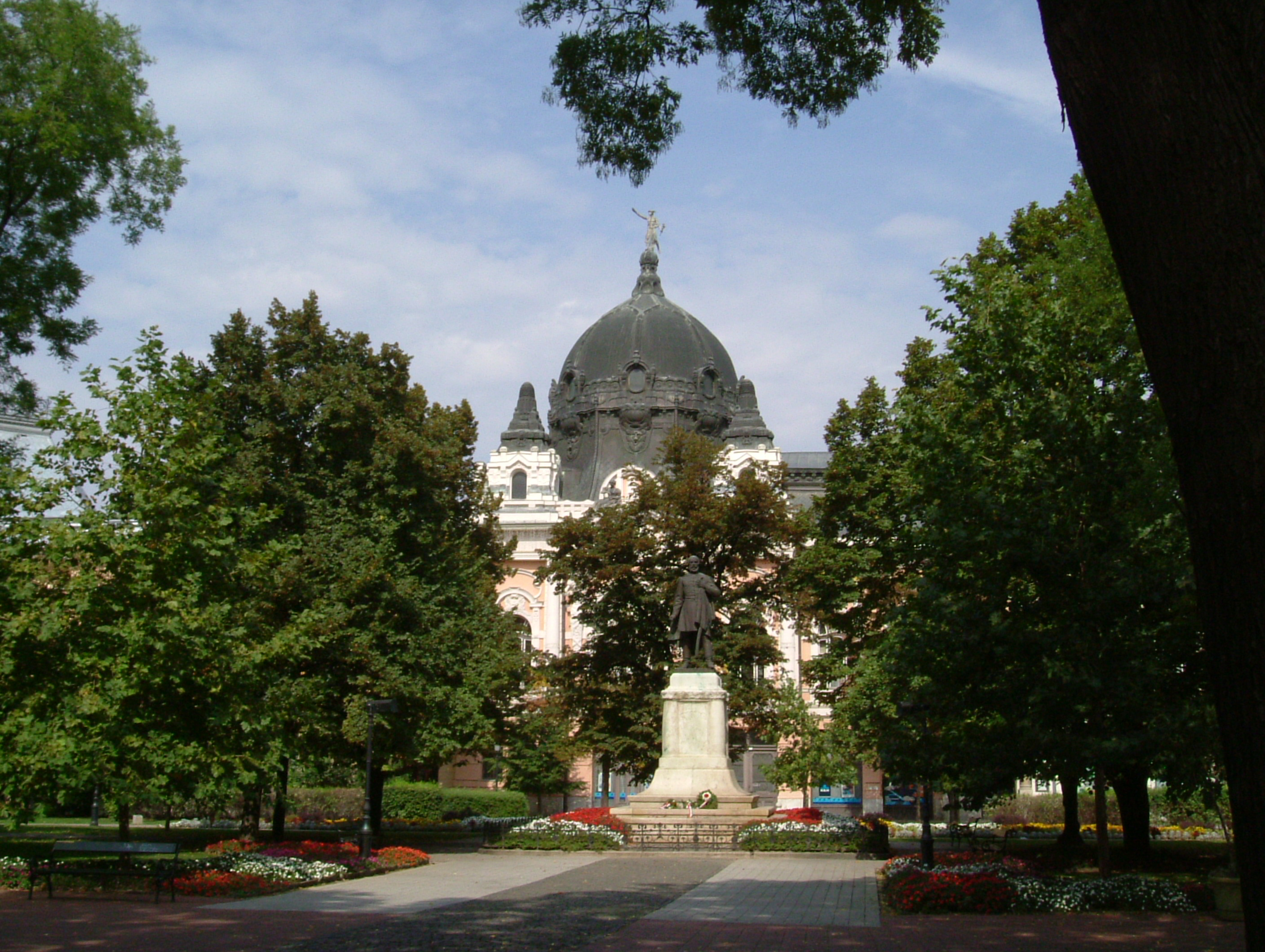
Hódmezővásárhely Magyar bank

Before the Mongol invasion of Hungary, at least seven villages with churches existed in the area. After the devastation caused by the Mongols, more villages were established, but these later became victims of the Turkish invasion. The territories of these villages were later absorbed by Hódmezővásárhely as the town grew. Evidence of more than twenty villages and churches from the Middle Ages have been found.

The present town of Hódmezővásárhely developed in the 15th century when Hód, Vásárhely, Tarján, and Ábrány, once small villages, became joined and the market town was established. The town is known to have been called Hódvásárhely in 1437. The town's location next to the road leading from Csongrád to Csanád was advantageous for the development of trade. In the Middle Ages markets, and particularly the trade in livestock, fuelled its growth.

Hódmezővásárhely was part of Csongrád comitatus. Part of that county was under Turkish control after 1542. The region between the Tisza and the Danube belonged to the Ottoman Empire, while the area to the east of the Tisza, including Hódmezővásárhely, belonged to Transylvania. After the military expedition of 1552, the whole of Csongrád county was taken by the Turks. The entire area was devastated by the Turkish offensive in 1566. The region was occupied by the Turks for the next 150 years.

=== Independence ===
At the time of the Rákóczi war of independence (1703–1711), the town was under the control of Count Miklós Bercsényi. The royal court confiscated the estate and gave it to imperial general Leopold Schlick. During the war of independence, Miklós Bercsényi seized the town back and gave it to the Kuruts general Sándor Károlyi for leasehold. The royal court in Vienna did not accept Károlyi's claim to the territory after the peace of Szatmár and he was only able to retrieve it by buying it back years later. From 1722 to 1818, when landowner jurisdiction was abolished, the Károlyi family possessed the town.

In the 1848–49 fights for freedom, Hódmezővásárhely played a significant part in national events. Lajos Kossuth reached the town on 3 October 1848 on his second recruiting trip. While there, he received the news that the Hungarian Army had been engaged in battle at Pákozd, and patriotic fervour gripped the town. Troops from Hódmezővásárhely took part in beating off the southern Serbian attacks.

After the control of the Theiss in the 1860s, the surrounding lakes and brooks dried up. The inner areas were progressively filled and the town's population increased.

Hódmezővásárhely seceded from the county in 1873 and received independent municipal rights. The first signs of industrialisation were apparent from that time. In 1890 Hódmezővásárhely was the fourth largest Hungarian town with 55,475 inhabitants.

=== 20th century ===
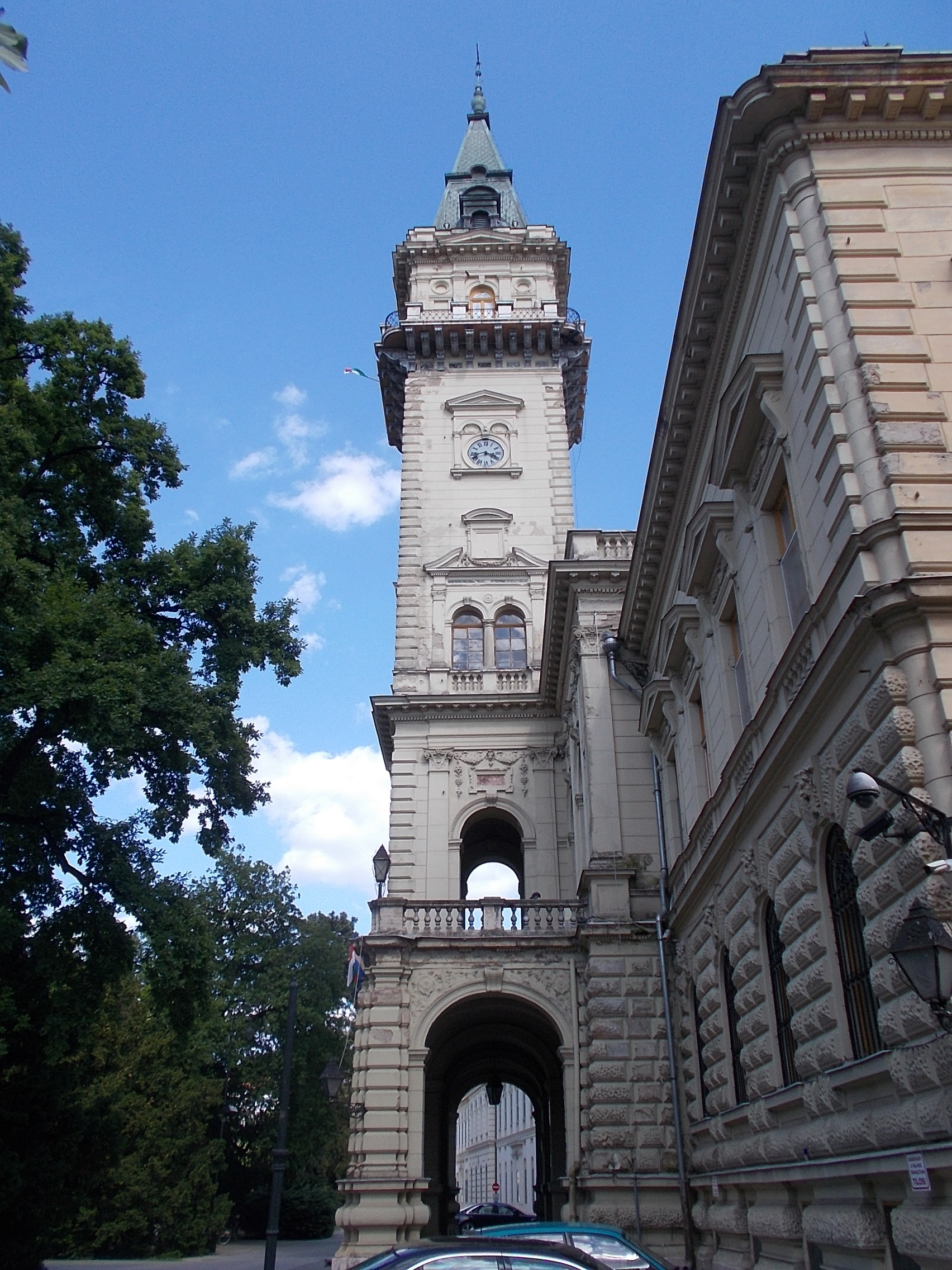
The town hall

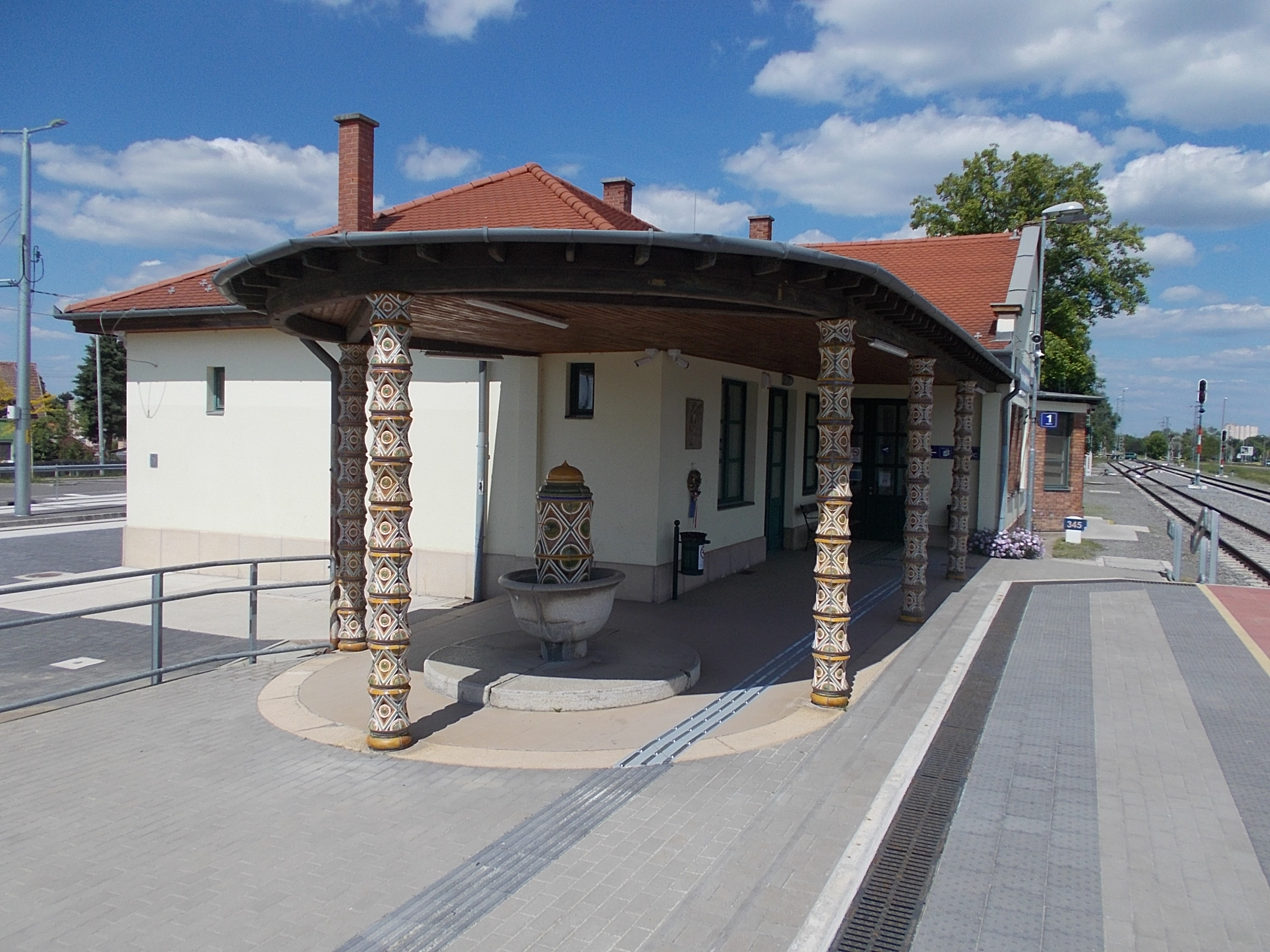
Hódmezővásárhelyi Népkert railway station's main building was built in 1930 with folk Art-Nouveau elements

The modern picture of the town was established at the turn of the century. These decades were characterised by the construction of wells, dynamic building operations, and the construction of canals. 70 per cent of the population, however, was engaged in farming and animal breeding.

A typical system of settlement was established with a large system of detached farms. Animal breeding still dominated the livelihood of the inhabitants. Rural animal breeding was characterised by economic efficiency. Quality horse breeding, which was partly an export product and partly demanded by the needs of agriculture, was profitable. Poultry and egg production for the markets also flourished. Animal breeding was gradually replaced by extensive growing of corn, which became the basis of the town's economy and employed large numbers of workers.

The First World War hindered the development of the town and its people suffered losses. The human costs of the war contributed to the social tension around this time which led to demonstrations in Vásárhely.

In the first decade of the Horthy era, there was a fairly good market for the town's agricultural products. Although the war and the occupation debilitated the economy of the town, the possibilities for the sale of the high-quality corn increased. Pork breeding grew, as did the export of poultry. Dozens of medium-scale factories sprung up, but the great world economic crisis demolished this new-found prosperity. Unemployment increased, until a new economic boom in the late 1930s.

The Second World War interrupted the development again. Soviet troops reached the town on 25 September 1944. Most of the powerful and well-off citizens escaped from Vásárhely. The war surged through the town on 8 October. The damage in human lives and buildings was not so huge as the damage to industrial equipment and infrastructure.

At the end of the 1960s giant factories were established. Full employment was realised but the town's industry proved inefficient. Political and economic bankruptcy, however, only emerged at the end of the 1980s.

After the transition in 1990, Hódmezővásárhely became a municipal town of county rank. After the municipal elections, its government was established.

The town is now a destination for foreign and domestic tourism. Museums, churches, triumphal wells, statues, parks, and a thermal swimming hall are notable attractions.

== Demographics ==
Historical population
Year	Pop.	±%
1850	33,325	—
1870	41,018	+23.1%
1890	47,891	+16.8%
1900	50,673	+5.8%
1910	51,920	+2.5%
1920	50,949	−1.9%
1930	50,583	−0.7%
1941	51,159	+1.1%
1949	48,982	−4.3%
1960	53,492	+9.2%
1970	53,715	+0.4%
1980	54,486	+1.4%
1990	51,180	−6.1%
2001	49,382	−3.5%
2011	46,047	−6.8%

== Politics ==
The mayor of Hódmezővásárhely István Almási (Fidesz-KDNP) died on 20 November 2017, leaving the position vacant. The independent candidate Péter Márki-Zay won the mayoral by-election on 25 February 2018. His unexpected victory against the Fidesz candidate received international attention and was seen as a possible indicator for a change in the Hungarian parliamentary election on 8 April 2018. The swing was not replicated in the parliamentary election.

The current mayor of Hódmezővásárhely is Péter Márki-Zay (Mindenki Magyarországa).

The local Municipal Assembly, elected at the 2019 local government elections, is made up of 15 members (1 Mayor, 10 Individual constituencies MEPs and 4 Compensation List MEPs) divided into this political parties and alliances:

Party	Seats	Current Municipal Assembly
Mindenki Magyarországa-For a clean Vásárhely	10	M
Love Vásárhely-Fidesz-KDNP	5	

=== List of mayors ===
List of City Mayors from 1990:

Member	Party	Term of office
András Rapcsák	Independent	1990–2002
András Rapcsák	KDNP	1990–2002
András Rapcsák	Fidesz	1990–2002
János Lázár	Fidesz (-KDNP)	2002–2012
István Almási	Fidesz-KDNP	2012–2017
Péter Márki-Zay	Independent	2018–

== People ==
- Lucien Hervé, photographer
- Robert Ilosfalvy, operatic tenor
- Ede Kallós, sculptor
- Ákos Kecskés, footballer
- Ladislaus IV of Hungary
- Emil Lindenfeld, painter
- János Pásztor
- Éva Risztov, swimmer
- János Tornyai, painter
- Franz Wittmann

== Sport ==
The association football club, Hódmezővásárhelyi FC, is based in Hódmezővásárhely.

== Twin towns – sister cities ==
Hódmezővásárhely is twinned with:

- Arad, Romania
- Baia Mare, Romania
- Baja, Hungary
- Brețcu, Romania
- Bruckneudorf, Austria
- Aksaray, Turkey
- Debeljača (Kovačica), Serbia
- Hechingen, Germany
- Kelmė, Lithuania
- Kiskunhalas, Hungary
- Senta, Serbia
- Sokobanja, Serbia
- Solotvyno, Ukraine
- Tamar, Israel
- Turda, Romania
- Vallauris, France
- Vidin, Bulgaria
- Zgierz, Poland

== Gallery ==
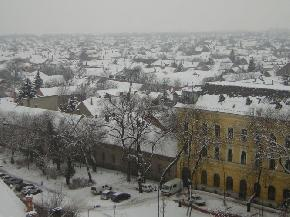

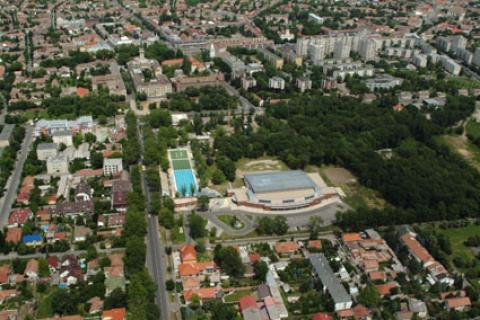
Aerial photography of Hódmezővásárhely

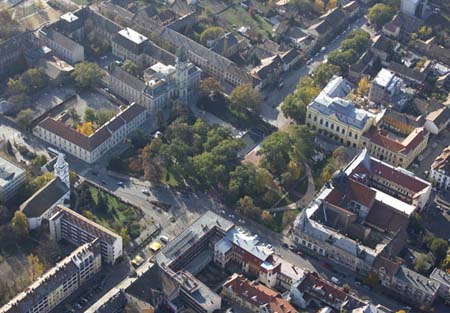

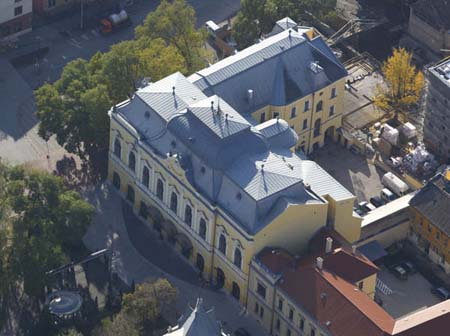

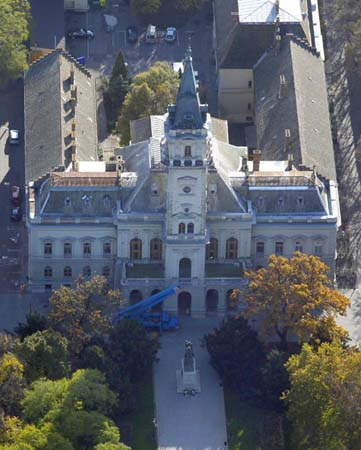
Town hall

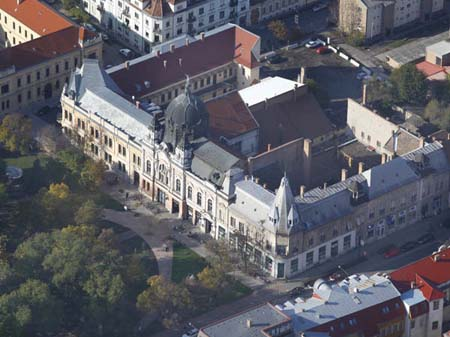

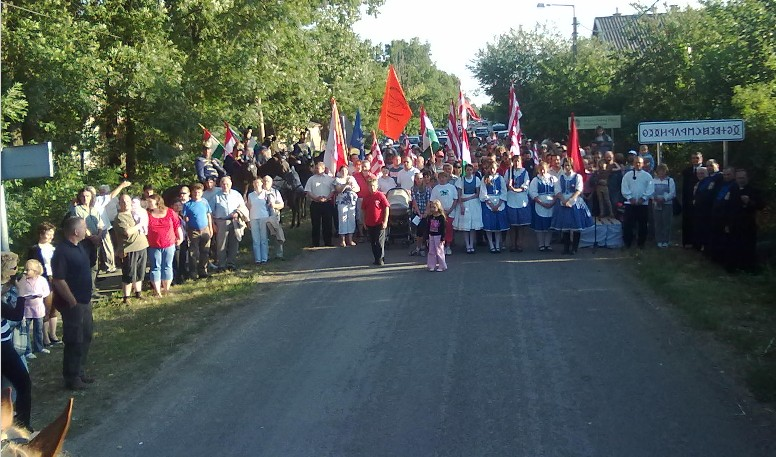
Rovas city limit sign celebration, 2011

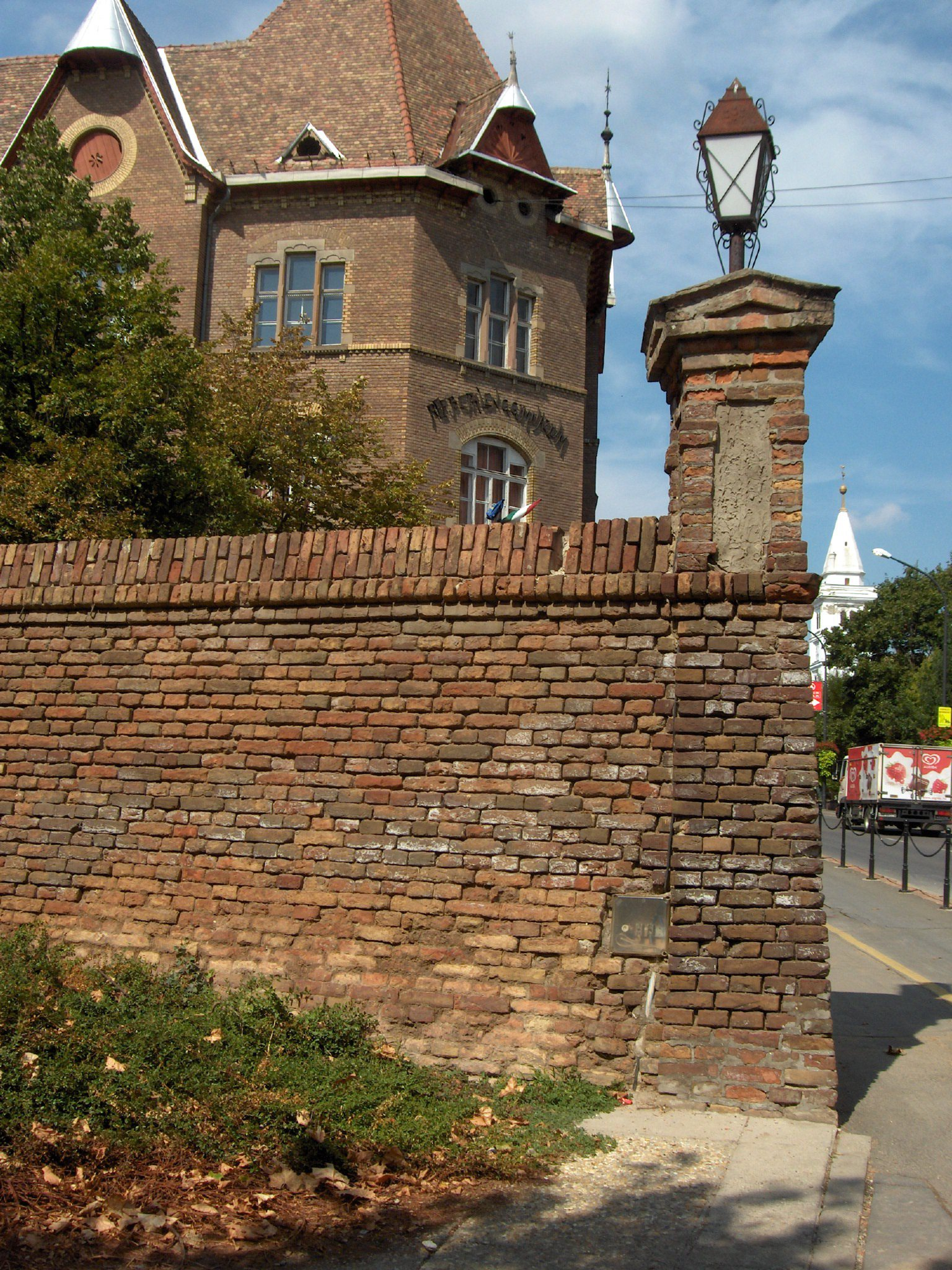
Old flood protection wall in the city centre

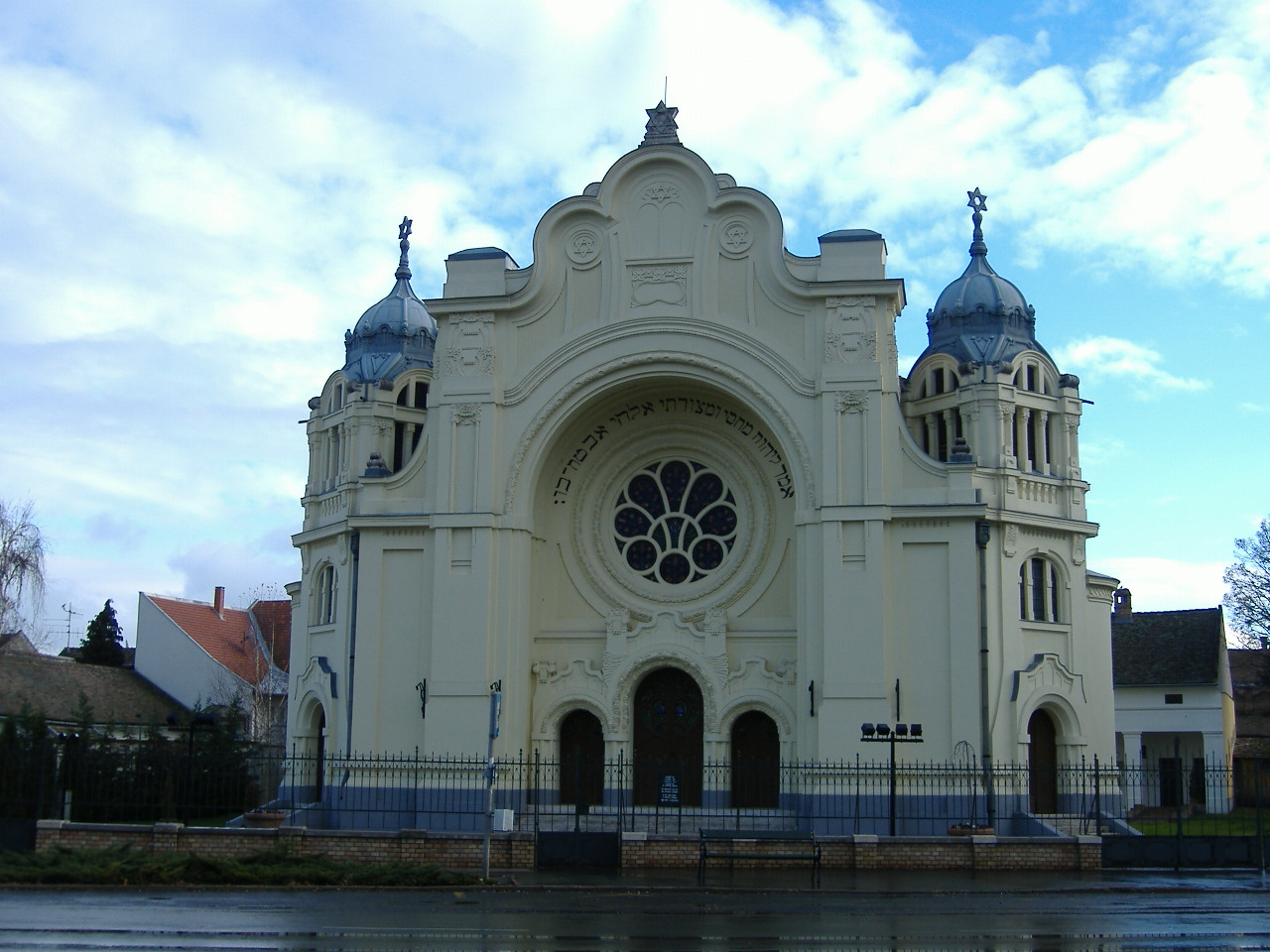
Old Synagogue

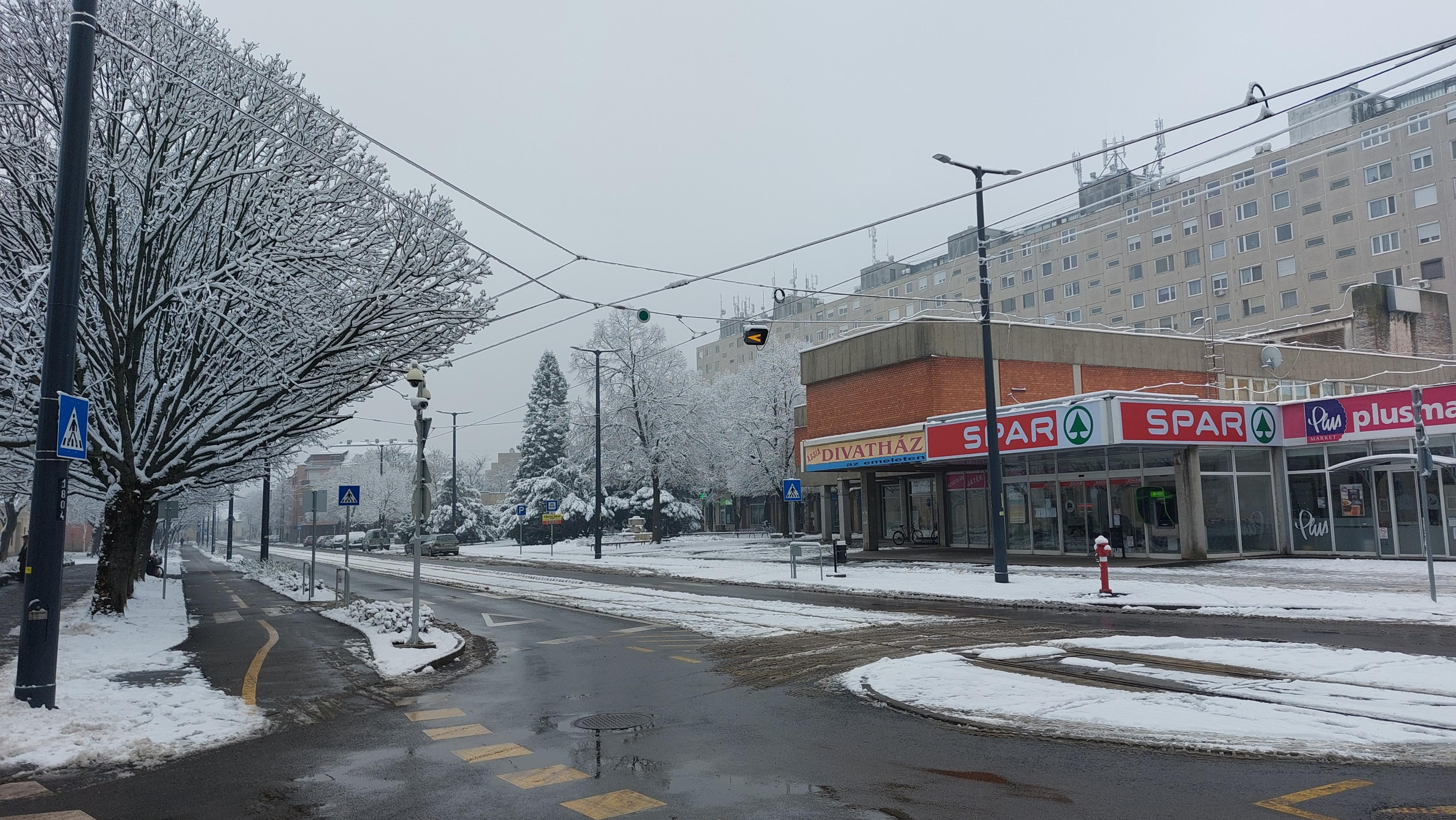
Snow storm on 9 January 2022.
