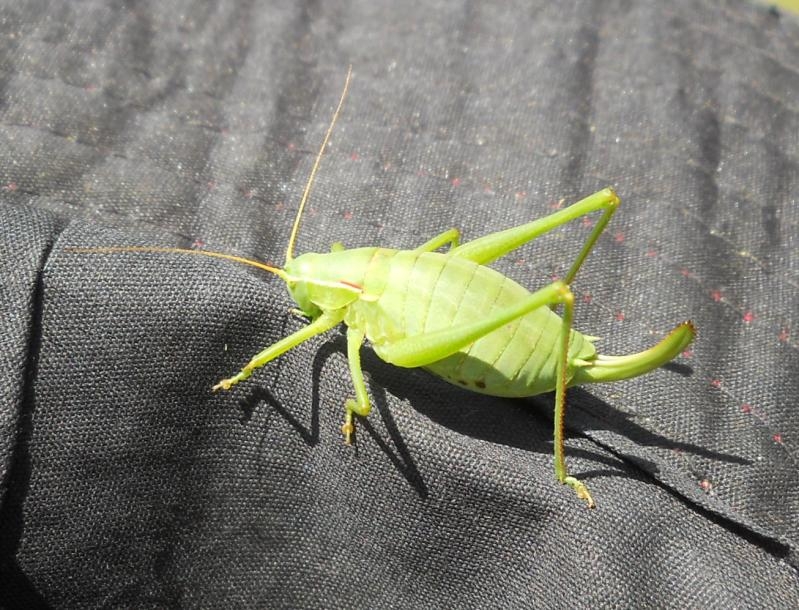
- Isophya kraussii

Scientific classification
- Kingdom: Animalia
- Phylum: Arthropoda
- Clade: Pancrustacea
- Class: Insecta
- Order: Orthoptera
- Suborder: Ensifera
- Family: Tettigoniidae
- Subfamily: Phaneropterinae
- Genus: Isophya
- Species: I. kraussii

Binomial name
- Isophya kraussii Brunner von Wattenwyl, 1878

Audio
- Song

= Isophya kraussii =

Species of cricket-like animal

Isophya kraussii is a species of insect belonging to the family Tettigoniidae subfamily Phaneropterinae. It is found in Poland, Germany, Austria, the Czech Republic, Slovakia, Slovenia, Croatia and Hungary. The species prefers bushy dry grasslands, forest edges and high-growing, slightly wet meadows. The imagines appear early in the year from about mid-June, but the majority are to be found from July.

Close-up of a Isophya kraussii
