= Móra Ferenc Múzeum =

Museum in Szeged, Hungary

Coordinates: 46.2523°N 20.1521°E

Móra Ferenc Museum
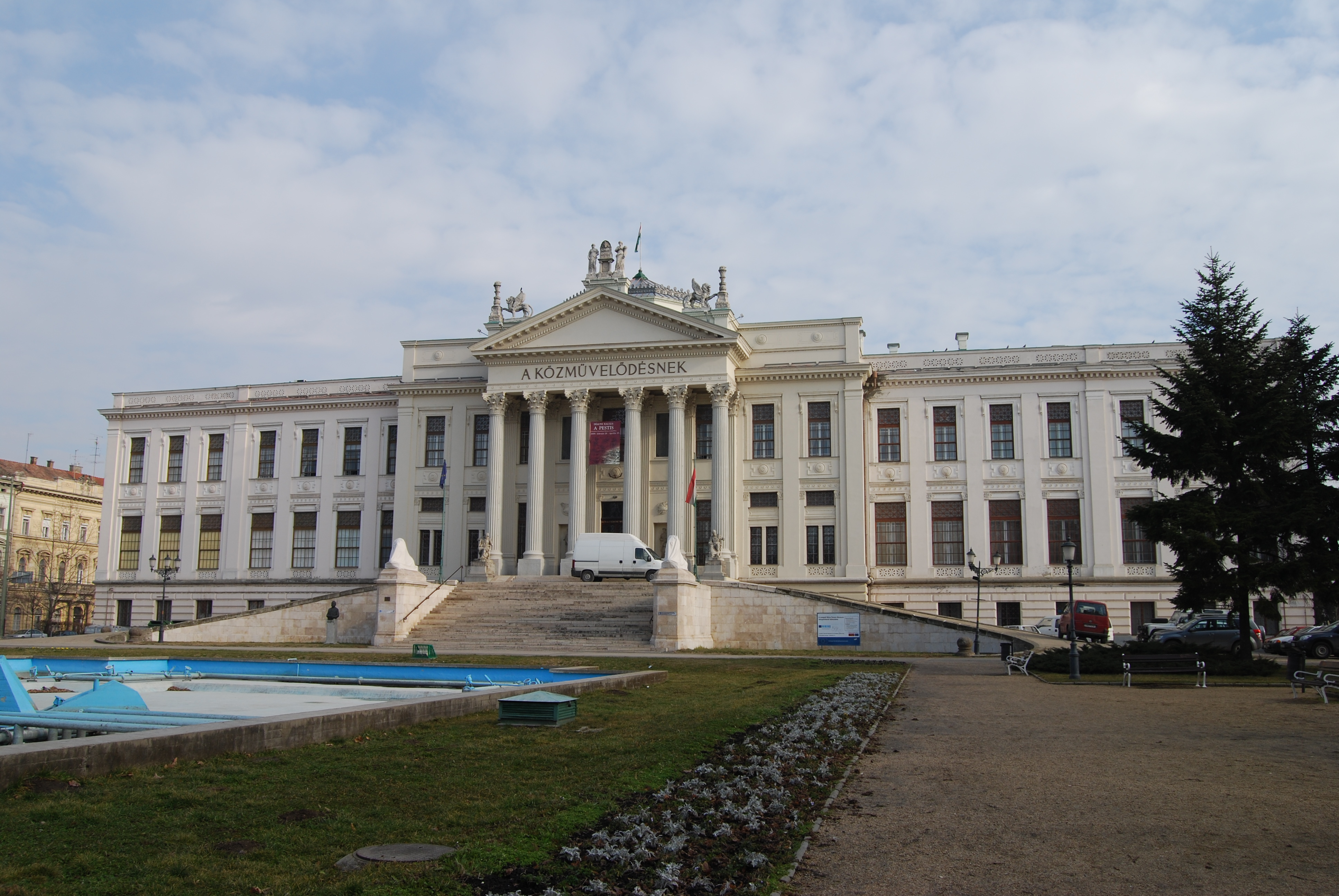
- Established: 1883
- Location: 6720 Szeged, Roosevelt tér 1-3.
- Type: Neoclassical
- Director: Ottó Fogas
- Website: http://moramuzeum.hu/

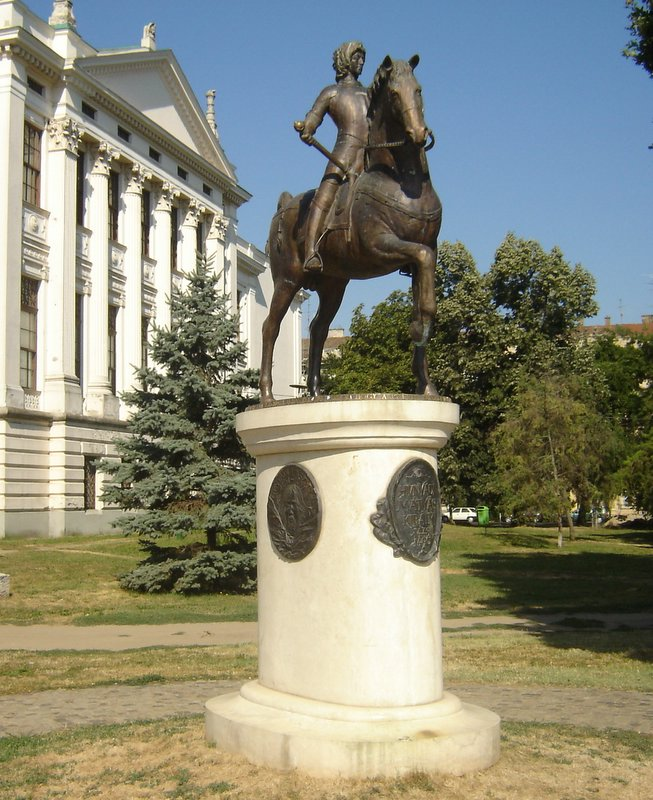
The back of the museum, in the foreground, a statue of Hunyadiak

The Móra Ferenc Museum (6720 Szeged, Roosevelt tér 1-3.) is a museum in Szeged, Hungary. The museum stands at the intersection of the bank of the river Tisza and the city's Downtown Bridge. In addition to its seasonal exhibitions, archaeological, ethnographic, historical, and scientific research is conducted at the museum. The museum's predecessor was founded in 1883 as part of the city library, whose director, János Reizner, began building its collection. The town assembly decided in 1893 to build a Palace of Culture for the library and the city museum; construction began in 1895, and the neoclassical building opened on 6 September 1896. The museum and the library were separated in 1950, and on 2 April 1951 the museum was named after its former director, Ferenc Móra. The building was extended and renovated in 1954–1955, and its largest renovation since then, covering the facade, the roof and the interiors, was completed in 2020; the museum reopened on 14 August 2020.

Works by Victor Vasarely and Tivadar Csontváry Kosztka have been displayed in the Móra Ferenc Museum, and in 2012, an exhibition featuring the works of Mihály Munkácsy became the museum's then most successful seasonal exhibition. This record was exceeded in 2014 by an exhibition titled “Pharaohs’ Egypt” which attracted more than 114,000 visitors by year’s end.

== Museum collections ==
The Móra Ferenc Memorial Room commemorates the museum's former director, who joined the museum in 1904, led it from 1917 and died in 1934. Mora Ferenc is remembered as an outstanding figure in Hungarian national literature, and as an archaeologist and researcher. The exhibition room contains many of his personal items, including his furniture, and photo collection.

The museum's exhibition of natural sciences, titled “We Only Have One Earth,” presents us with Earth’s history from its formation, up to the modern era. Visitors can simulate travelling millions of years into the past with the help of installations, several millions of years old fossils, and a 3D animation of a cave bear.

The ethnographic exhibition is titled “The Famous Town of Szeged”. Its featured topics are Tisza-related activities, its best-known craft of making slippers and knives, bullrush weaving, the peculiarities of folk architecture. The folk life of the Szeged-area is illustrated using interactive, audiovisual equipment, in addition to the photo and audio material on various screens.

The Mora Ferenc museum's spectacle of gold collection is also open to the public and presents an approximately 10 kg of unique and highly valuable treasure. In the unconventionally lit room, visitors can view one of the biggest and more significant gold treasures of the Huns, the gold artifacts of Nagyszéksos, which Ferenc Móra rescued in 1926. The collection also features valuable red gold, memorial coins and particular household objects, such as the golden pen of Istvan Tomorkény (former director of the museum, writer, publicist) or a tie pin bearing Lajos Kossuth's engraved portrait.

== Premises of Further Exhibitions ==
=== Fekete-ház (6720 Szeged, Somogyi u. 13.) ===
The Fekete ház (meaning Black House) is situated at the heart of the city center near the Dóm Square. The ground floor and first floor of the building are places of seasonal exhibitions. The upstairs rooms give home to a furniture collection replicating the interior of an upper class family’s home: visitors are provided with a glimpse into the civilian housing culture of Szeged.

The exhibition features two salons, a beautiful girl’s room and a tower room providing a view of Szeged the beauty of which is unmatched by any vantage point in the city. A permanent pharmacy history exhibition is also open to the public. Its main attraction is the equipment of the last remaining 19th century pharmacy in the Great Hungarian Plain.

=== Kass Gallery (6720 Szeged, Vár u. 7.) ===
The gallery was dedicated to provide a glimpse into the various artistic phases of Kass János, who was one of Szeged’s most exceptional artists and a recipient of several prestigious state awards. In addition to the more outstanding works of János Kass, the gallery opened up to seasonal contemporary exhibitions and still is a supporting location of major temporary exhibitions.

=== Varga Mátyás Theatre History Collection and Exhibition Hall (6720 Szeged, Bécsi krt. 11/A) ===
The three-story building and its nearly 300 m^{2} exhibition space puts the works (encompassing more than six decades) of Varga Mártyás on display, through which visitors are acquainted with a huge portion of Hungarian Theatre History. During the summer months the garden is a place of public talks and programs in connection with the local theatric scene and the Open-Air Festival of Szeged.

=== Castle and Stone Store (6720 Szeged, Stefánia sétány 15.) ===
The Castle Museum is a place for organized events and seasonal exhibitions. The museum’s building is a remnant of the former castle of Szeged: it is an impressing architectural monument from the Baroque Period. The stone store is a collection of the most important architectural finds from the history of Szeged. Visitors of the stone store can acquaint themselves with architectural treasures from the Roman, Árpád, Medieval, Baroque and Renaissance Periods, thus roaming through two thousand years of architecture in one place.
