= Mártély =

Coordinates: 46°29′N 20°13′E

- Village
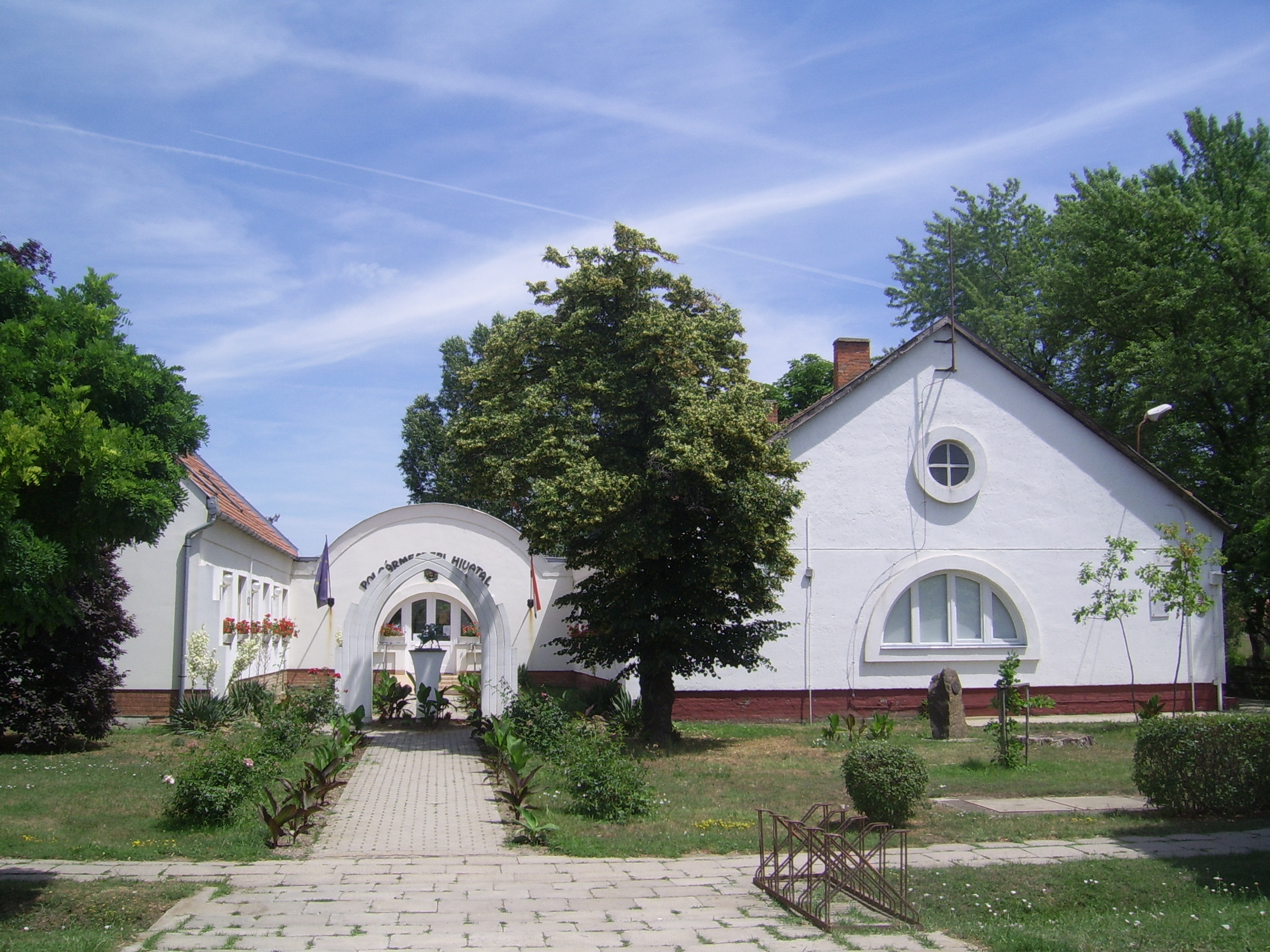
- Community hall

- Coat of arms
- Interactive map of Mártély
- Country: Hungary
- County: Csongrád

Area
  - Total: 41.21 km^{2} (15.91 sq mi)

Population (2015)
  - Total: 1,301
  - Density: 35.7/km^{2} (92/sq mi)
- Time zone: UTC+1 (CET)
  - Summer (DST): UTC+2 (CEST)
- Postal code: 6636
- Area code: 62

Mártély is a village in Csongrád county, in the Southern Great Plain region of southern Hungary.

== Geography ==
It covers an area of 41.21 km^{2} (16 sq mi) and has a population of 1301 people (2015).

== History ==
The village dates back to the Kingdom of Hungary and the days of Árpád. Saint Stephen of Hungary gifted the village to the abbey of Zalavár, along with its fishing rights. The village's name appeared in writing in 1019 as "Adriani". The village derived its name from its church dedicated to Saint Adrianus, the patron saint of the abbey of Zalavár.
