= Budapest 12th constituency =

Hungarian legislative district

Coordinates: 47°36′N 19°06′E

Budapest 12th constituency (District XV.)
- Constituency for the National Assembly
- Location of Budapest 12 within Budapest

- Location of Budapest within Hungary
- City: Budapest
- Electorate: 75,711 (2018)
- Major settlements: 15th District

Current constituency
- Created: 2011
- Party: Tisza Party
- Member: Zsuzsanna Jakab
- Elected: 2026

The 12th constituency of Budapest (Hungarian: Budapesti 12. számú országgyűlési egyéni választókerület) is one of the single-member constituencies of the National Assembly, the national legislature of Hungary. The constituency standard abbreviation: Budapest 12. OEVK.

Since 2026, it has been represented by Zsuzsanna Jakab of the Tisza Party.

== Geography ==
The 12th constituency is located in northern part of Pest.

=== List of districts ===
The constituency includes the following municipalities:

1. District XV.: Full part of the district.
2. District IV.: Eastern part of Árpád út.

== Members ==
The constituency was first represented by Tamás László of the Fidesz from 2014 to 2018. László Hajdu of the DK was elected in 2018. In the 2026 election, Zsuzsanna Jakab of the Tisza Party was elected representative.

Election	Member	Party	%
2014	Tamás László	Fidesz	
2018	László Hajdu	DK	
2022	Balázs Barkóczi	DK	45.1
2026	Zsuzsanna Jakab	TISZA	64.4
