= Opinion polling for the 2018 Hungarian parliamentary election =

This page lists public opinion polls conducted for the 2018 Hungarian parliamentary election, which was held on 8 April 2018.

== Graphical summary ==
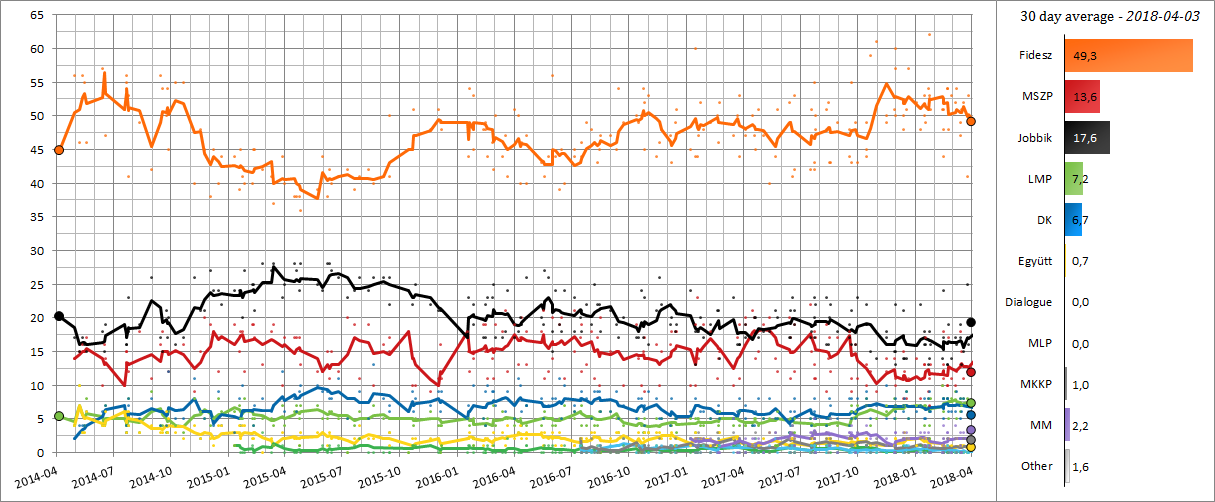

== Poll results ==
Methodological note: The Hungarian pollsters generally release separate data about the support of political parties among all eligible voters (which tends to include a high percentage for "don't know/no preference"), and about the support of political parties among "active" or "certain" voters. The table below refers to the latter data. (Note: In addition, confusingly, two pollsters publish parallel data even about "active" or "certain" voters. Thus, Medián publishes different numbers for the categories of "választani tudók" and "választani tudó "biztos" szavazók", though they don't tend to differ much – the data in the table here generally refers to the latter. Tárki's polling releases always highlight results about "A pártok támogatottsága a pártválasztók körében", and those are included in the table here (and can be reviewed further back into time in this database on their website), but their website also provides a separate database with somewhat different polling data on "A pártok támogatottságának alakulása a biztos szavazó pártválasztók körében". Finally, in February 2013 Nézőpont switched to a system in which it distinguishes between "the entire population" and "active voters", but even the "active voters" sample always includes a percentage of those who are "undecided but favour a change in government" and a percentage of those who are "undecided altogether". Those numbers are given in the footnotes for each Nézőpont poll in the table.)

Poll results are listed in the table below in reverse chronological order, showing the most recent first, and using the date the survey's fieldwork was done, as opposed to the date of publication. If such date is unknown, the date of publication is given instead. The highest percentage figure in each polling survey is displayed in bold, and the background shaded in the leading party's colour. In the instance that there is a tie, then no figure is shaded. The lead column on the right shows the percentage-point difference between the two parties with the highest figures. When a specific poll does not show a data figure for a party, the party's cell corresponding to that poll is shown empty.

Fieldwork date	Polling firm	Fidesz-KDNP	Hungarian Socialist Party	Jobbik	LMP	DK	Together	Dialogue	MLP	MKKP	Momentum	Other	Lead
**8 Apr 2018**	**National Election**	49.3	**11.9**	**19.1**	**7.1**	**5.4**	**0.7**	**(MSZP)**	**(MSZP)**	**1.7**	**3.1**	**1.9**	**30.2**
28 Mar–3 Apr	Publicus	45	19	20	7	5	0	(MSZP)	0	0	2	2	25
Mar	Századvég	51	15	13	7	6	1	(MSZP)	(MSZP)	(other)	(other)	7	36
23–27 Mar	Medián	53	12	16	7	6	1	(MSZP)	0	2	2	1	37
21–24 Mar	Iránytű	41	12	25	8	7	0	(MSZP)	0	2	3	2	16
10–23 Mar	Republikon	49	17	19	4	5	2	(MSZP)	(MSZP)	0	2	2	30
3–19 Mar	Nézőpont	52	11	15	8	8	0	(MSZP)	0	2	3	1	37
9–14 Mar	Publicus	49	18	17	8	5	1	(MSZP)	0	1	1	0	31
7–14 Mar	ZRi	47	13	19	6	8	1	(MSZP)	0	0	3	1	28
2–7 Mar	Medián	54	12	16	5	9	2	(MSZP)	0	0	2	0	38
1–5 Mar	Nézőpont	52	10	17	9	6	0	(MSZP)	0	2	4	0	35
26–28 Feb	Századvég	53	11	14	8	6	1	(MSZP)	(MSZP)	(other)	(other)	7	39
9–22 Feb	Republikon	48	17	19	5	5	2	(MSZP)	(MSZP)	0	2	1	29
Feb	Iránytű	44	11	24	8	8	0	0	0	0	4	1	20
3–21 Feb	Nézőpont	54	10	13	8	8	1	(MSZP)	1	2	3	0	41
7–15 Feb	ZRi	51	13	17	6	8	1	(MSZP)	0	0	2	0	34
9–14 Feb	Publicus	48	18	16	8	5	0	0	0	2	1	2	30
6–13 Feb	Századvég	51	10	14	10	7	1	(MSZP)	(MSZP)	(other)	(other)	7	37
20–30 Jan	Republikon	53	13	18	4	5	2	(MSZP)	1	0	3	1	35
11–23 Jan	Tárki	62	7	14	4	6	2	2	0	0	1	0	48
17–24 Jan	Századvég	51	13	16	8	6	1	(other)	(other)	(other)	(other)	5	35
19–23 Jan	Medián	53	11	18	6	9	1	(MSZP)	0	0	1	0	35
5–9 Jan	Iránytű	48	8	22	7	7	2	1	0	2	3	0	26
3–21 Jan	Nézőpont	54	9	13	8	8	1	1	1	2	3	3	41
10–16 Jan	Publicus	49	17	16	7	5	2	0	0	1	1	3	32
7–15 Jan	ZRi	50	13	16	7	8	1	0	1	1	2	1	34
**2018**
27 Dec–2 Jan	Századvég	52	14	16	7	6	1	(other)	(other)	(other)	(other)	4	36
10–20 Dec	Republikon	57	11	16	5	5	2	(Együtt)	1	0	2	1	41
8–13 Dec	Publicus	48	15	14	7	6	2	0	0	2	2	4	33
6–14 Dec	ZRi	52	12	14	7	8	3	(Együtt)	1	0	2	1	38
6–12 Dec	Iránytű	50	8	21	7	7	2	1	0	2	3	0	29
1–18 Dec	Nézőpont	51	8	14	9	9	2	1	1	2	3	0	37
Nov	Medián	60	10	15	5	7	2	(Együtt)	0	0	1	0	45
24–30 Nov	Iránytű	50	7	22	7	8	1	1	0	1	3	1	28
20–28 Nov	Századvég	51	14	15	8	5	1	(Együtt)	(other)	(other)	(other)	6	36
18–30 Nov	Republikon	57	11	13	6	6	2	(Együtt)	1	0	3	2	44
11–15 Nov	Publicus	50	14	17	7	5	1	(Együtt)	0	1	1	2	33
6–14 Nov	ZRi	49	12	18	6	10	1	(Együtt)	1	1	2	0	31
1–19 Nov	Nézőpont	48	9	16	8	8	2	1	1	2	4	1	32
16–21 Oct	Iránytű	49	7	22	8	7	1	1	0	1	3	1	27
20–24 Oct	Medián	61	9	14	5	7	1	(Együtt)	0	2	1	0	47
13–21 Oct	Tárki	59	12	15	4	5	1	0	0	0	2	2	44
11–17 Oct	Publicus	49	15	17	7	4	0	0	0	2	2	4	32
8–15 Oct	Századvég	50	16	16	7	5	1	(other)	(other)	(other)	(other)	5	34
6–20 Oct	Republikon	54	12	15	6	5	2	1	1	0	3	1	39
6–15 Oct	ZRi	45	13	19	6	9	1	1	1	1	3	1	26
2–15 Oct	Nézőpont	44	10	19	7	8	2	1	1	3	4	1	25
24–30 Sep	Iránytű	43	11	23	7	8	2	1	0	3	3	0	20
23–27 Sep	Századvég	49	16	16	6	5	1	(other)	(other)	(other)	(other)	7	33
15–20 Sep	Medián	55	9	16	7	5	2	1	0	1	3	1	39
14–18 Sep	Publicus	48	18	17	4	4	1	0	0	2	3	3	30
10–18 Sep	ZRi	44	17	19	4	8	2	1	1	1	3	0	23
6-13 Sep	Republikon	53	11	15	6	6	2	2	1	0	3	1	38
1–20 Sep	Nézőpont	43	11	21	6	8	2	1	1	2	4	1	22
28–30 Aug	Századvég	49	17	18	4	5	1	(other)	(other)	(other)	(other)	6	31
10–12 Aug	Iránytű	51	9	23	4	5	2	1	1	3	3	1	28
10–12 Aug	Publicus	48	19	16	4	4	1	0	0	2	3	2	29
3–15 Aug	Republikon	52	14	16	5	5	2	1	1	0	3	1	36
10–17 Aug	ZRi	43	17	20	5	8	2	1	1	1	1	1	23
1–18 Aug	Nézőpont	43	12	22	5	7	2	0	1	2	5	1	21
21–25 Jul	Századvég	48	17	19	5	5	1	(other)	(other)	(other)	(other)	5	29
22–25 Jul	Iránytű	50	11	22	4	5	1	1	0	3	3	0	32
16–23 Jul	ZRi	42	18	20	4	8	2	1	1	2	2	1	22
14–23 Jul	Tárki	55	11	17	3	5	1	1	0	0	3	4	38
13–18 Jul	Publicus	42	22	17	5	5	0	0	0	2	3	3	20
4–23 Jul	Nézőpont	43	13	23	4	6	2	0	1	2	5	1	20
7–19 Jul	Republikon	51	15	18	4	4	2	1	1	0	3	1	33
16–21 Jun	Medián	53	12	21	3	6	1	0	0	1	1	2	32
2–18 Jun	Nézőpont	41	15	23	4	5	2	1	1	3	4	1	18
Jun	Repubikon	49	17	17	5	4	2	1	1	0	3	1	32
Jun	Iránytű	49	11	21	5	6	1	0	0	3	3	1	28
14–21 Jun	ZRi	42	19	19	5	8	2	0	1	0	2	2	32
9–13 Jun	Publicus	52	20	17	3	3	1	0	0	1	2	1	32
16–25 May	Iránytű	51	12	20	6	5	1	1	0	2	2	0	31
4–23 May	Nézőpont	44	14	21	5	5	1	1	2	3	3	1	23
4–13 May	ZRi	40	20	18	5	8	3	0	1	0	3	2	20
13–26 Apr	Tárki	51	15	17	4	8	1	0	0	0	2	1	34
1–20 Apr	Nézőpont	45	14	20	5	6	2	1	2	3	1	0	25
26 Apr–May 3	Századvég	47	19	18	5	5	2	(other)	(other)	(other)	(other)	4	22
10–16 Apr	Publicus	50	21	17	4	4	1	0	0	1	2	3	29
7–19 Apr	Republikon	47	20	20	5	4	1	0	1	0	2	0	27
29 Mar – 4 Apr	ZRi	47	20	17	4	7	1	0	1	0	2	1	27
29 Mar – 4 Apr	Századvég	48	19	19	4	5	1	(other)	(other)	(other)	(other)	4	29
3–26 Mar	Nézőpont	53	11	16	6	6	1	1	1	2	2	1	37
10–23 Mar	Republikon	50	17	16	5	6	2	1	1	0	0	2	33
18–26 Mar	ZRi	44	19	16	4	8	1	0	1	2	0	5	25
10–17 Mar	Iránytű	47	10	23	4	5	2	1	0	3	5	1	21
11–22 Feb	Republikon	52	15	14	6	5	3	1	1	0	0	3	23
3–20 Feb	Nézőpont	46	14	21	4	7	3	1	2	2	0	2	21
12–19 Feb	Iránytű	50	11	21	6	6	1	0	0	3	0	3	29
1–7 Feb	Századvég	49	18	19	5	5	1	(other)	(other)	(other)	(other)	3	20
Jan	Medián	60	10	13	3	7	3	0	0	1	2	1	47
20-28 Jan	ZRI	48	19	17	4	6	1	1	1	2	2	4	21
4–19 Jan	Nézőpont	47	14	18	5	7	2	1	2	3	1	3	24
Jan	ZRI	44	19	18	5	8	2	1	1	0	1	2	25
13–23 Jan	Tárki	52	15	20	4	6	2	1	0	0	2	1	24
13–18 Jan	Publicus	44	23	18	5	7	2	0	0	0	2	2	19
1–7 Jan	Nézőpont	45	10	24	5	6	1	0	2	2		5	26
**2017**
Dec	Republikon	51	18	19	3	5	2	1	1	0		0	24
9–14 Dec	Publicus	49	18	18	5	5	1	0	0	2		0	25
6–8 Dec	ZRi	43	18	20	4	8	3	1	1	0		2	23
2–6 Dec	Századvég	47	16	19	4	4	2	0	1	1		4	24
19–22 Nov	Republikon	48	15	22	5	5	2	0	1	0		1	22
10–18 Nov	Nézőpont	46	10	26	4	5	3	0	0	2		3	20
Nov	Medián	53	14	16	3	9	3	0	0	1		2	37
7–14 Nov	ZRi	44	16	21	5	8	3	1	1	0		2	23
24–26 Oct	Nézőpont	45	9	23	3	7	3	1	1	1		9	22
16–26 Oct	Republikon	52	17	19	5	4	1	0	0	1		2	33
14–23 Oct	Tárki	54	15	17	3	6	2	1	1	0		2	37
12–21 Oct	Iránytű	50	10	24	4	8	0	0	1	0		4	26
11–13 Oct	Publicus	50	19	17	4	5	1	0	0	1		4	31
9–16 Oct	ZRi	49	14	17	5	8	3	0	1	0		4	32
Sep	Századvég	47	15	21	6	6	2	0	1	0		3	26
18–21 Sep	Nézőpont	49	10	20	4	7	2	1	2	2		7	29
9–13 Sep	Medián	54	15	17	3	5	3	0	1	0		3	37
4–11 Sep	ZRI	45	15	19	5	9	3	0	1	0		4	26
Aug	Republikon	48	18	19	5	5	3	0	0	2		2	29
12–15 Aug	Nézőpont	45	10	22	6	9	2	1	1	0		5	23
11–16 Aug	Publicus	47	20	18	6	6	0	0	1	1		3	27
4–11 Aug	ZRI	43	17	22	4	9	1	0	1	0		4	21
1–7 Aug	Iránytű	46	11	25	4	9	3	0.3	0	0		1	21
Jul	Republikon	43	17	20	6	8	2	1	1	2		3	23
15–24 Jul	Tárki	49	13	22	4	8	2	0				2	27
15–17 Jul	Nézőpont	44	12	21	7	8	2	1				5	23
10–17 Jul	ZRI	46	19	18	4	9	2	0				2	27
1–6 Jul	Századvég	45	15	23	5	7	1	0				4	22
1–6 Jul	Publicus	44	21	18	6	6	1	0				4	23
17–19 Jun	Nézőpont	40	11	24	7	10	2	1				5	16
Jun	Medián	56	14	15	4	7	2	0				2	41
10–15 Jun	Publicus	45	20	18	5	5	1	0				5	25
5–12 Jun	ZRI	39	19	19	5	11	3	0				4	20
1–5 Jun	Századvég	44	16	24	4	8	1	0				3	20
25–31 May	Republikon	43	20	18	5	8	3	1				2	23
19–25 May	Iránytű	44	12	26	5	7	2	1				3	18
13–19 May	Nézőpont	41	11	27	6	7	3	1				3	14
12–17 May	Publicus	43	21	19	5	5	1	0				6	22
7–14 May	ZRI	43	18	20	4	8	3	0				4	23
15–20 Apr	Nézőpont	40	13	26	7	7	3	1				3	14
14–20 Apr	Tárki	47	18	20	4	7	2	1				1	27
8–12 Apr	Publicus	46	20	19	4	6	2	0				3	26
4–11 Apr	ZRI	40	17	20	5	10	4	0				4	20
1–7 Apr	Medián	50	13	18	3	11	3	0				1	32
Apr	Republikon	51	19	17	4	5	2	0				2	32
18–21 Mar	Nézőpont	41	12	24	5	9	4	2				3	17
10–17 Mar	Publicus	47	21	18	5	6	1	0				2	26
6–13 Mar	ZRI	44	18	17	6	8	3	0				4	26
Mar	Republikon	50	19	17	4	7	2	0				1	31
20–25 Feb	Századvég	46	14	23	4	9	1	0				3	23
18–28 Feb	Iránytű	42	11	25	7	9	3	1				2	17
12–17 Feb	Nézőpont	44	11	23	5	10	2	1				4	21
9–11 Feb	Publicus	48	19	17	5	5	1	0				4	29
Feb	Republikon	49	19	22	4	4	2	0				0	27
Feb	ZRI	48	15	17	4	9	2	0				5	31
22–27 Jan	Medián	53	15	19	2	7	1	1				2	34
22–26 Jan	Századvég	45	14	22	5	10	2	0				2	23
15–20 Jan	Tárki	54	12	20	4	6	3	1				1	34
15–19 Jan	Nézőpont	44	15	23	5	7	2	1				3	21
12–17 Jan	Publicus	49	18	17	5	5	2	0				4	31
**2016**
3–7 Dec	Nézőpont	48	11	21	4	9	1	1				5	27
2–5 Dec	Publicus	49	16	21	4	6	0	0				4	28
27 Nov–1 Dec	Medián	51	11	21	4	9	2	0				2	30
14–19 Nov	Nézőpont	48	9	22	6	7	2	1				5	26
17–21 Oct	Nézőpont	45	10	22	5	9	2	1				6	23
16–23 Oct	Tárki	51	14	23	4	6	1	1				1	28
14–26 Oct	Iránytű	47	10	25	5	8	2	1				1	22
9–15 Oct	Publicus	45	18	24	5	6	0	0				2	21
11–15 Sep	Medián	50	15	22	3	6	3	0				1	28
7–15 Sep	Ipsos	41	17	26	5	7	1	0				3	15
1–4 Sep	Századvég	41	16	26	5	8	2	(Együtt)				2	15
14–19 Aug	Nézőpont	40	10	26	7	13	2	0				2	14
6–12 Aug	Publicus	42	19	24	5	5	2	0				4	18
24–29 Jul	Nézőpont	41	11	26	6	9	4	2				1	15
17–21 Jul	Tárki	39	19	24	4	8	2	1				2	15
19–25 Jun	Nézőpont	41	12	26	5	11	2	1				2	15
10–14 Jun	Századvég	40	15	27	6	8	2	(Együtt)				2	13
7–9 Jul	Publicus	42	20	23	5	5	0	0				5	19
3–11 Jun	Iránytű	42	11	28	6	8	3	1				1	14
1–8 Jun	Ipsos	38	15	28	5	9	1	0				3	10
May	Medián	44	12	24	5	9	3	1				2	20
16–22 May	Nézőpont	39	12	25	7	10	3	0				4	14
20–25 Apr	Nézőpont	36	13	28	7	10	3	0				3	8
16–23 Apr	Tárki	38	17	24	5	9	1	1				4	14
12–19 Apr	Ipsos	38	17	27	7	6	2	0				2	11
10–15 Apr	Századvég	38	17	28	6	8	2	(Együtt)				1	10
27–31 Mar	Medián	40	17	25	4	6	2	0				2	15
21–27 Mar	Nézőpont	44	10	23	7	12	3	1				1	21
6–13 Mar	Ipsos	37	19	28	4	7	1	1				3	9
5–10 Mar	Századvég	41	18	27	5	6	2	(Együtt)				1	14
21–24 Feb	Nézőpont	42	13	28	5	8	0	3				1	14
6–11 Feb	Medián	45	17	21	5	7	3	(Együtt)				2	24
5–10 Feb	Századvég	45	19	25	4	4	2	(Együtt)				1	20
1–7 Feb	Ipsos	40	19	25	5	6	2	1				2	15
24–26 Jan	Nézőpont	40	12	27	8	6	4	(Együtt)				3	13
16–22 Jan	Tárki	41	18	20	5	10	4	(Együtt)				1	21
15–20 Jan	Századvég	45	18	24	5	4	2	(Együtt)				2	21
11–18 Jan	Iránytű	39	15	24	7	8	4	1				2	15
3–10 Jan	Ipsos	44	19	24	6	3	1	1				2	20
**2015**
15–20 Dec	Századvég	44	17	22	6	4	4	(Együtt)				3	22
9–16 Dec	Nézőpont	40	12	24	8	9	4	(Együtt)				3	16
1–8 Dec	Ipsos	45	18	24	5	4	1	0				3	21
28 Nov–2 Dec	Medián	38	19	27	4	6	2	(Együtt)				4	11
13–23 Nov	Tárki	45	20	21	5	5	3	(Együtt)				0	24
10–17 Nov	Ipsos	48	15	21	6	2	2	(Együtt)				5	27
3–7 Nov	Nézőpont	40	9	26	8	11	4	(Együtt)				2	14
14–20 Oct	Tárki	55	16	17	3	5	2	(Együtt)				1	38
1–7 Oct	Ipsos	55	15	16	4	5	3	(Együtt)				2	39
22–26 Sep	Nézőpont	45	12	20	6	12	5	(Együtt)				0	25
22–25 Sep	Századvég	54	15	17	3	6	3	(Együtt)				2	37
19–23 Sep	Medián	50	15	21	3	4	6	(Együtt)				1	29
10–17 Sep	Tárki	54	18	15	4	6	3	(Együtt)				1	36
7–14 Sep	Ipsos	56	16	17	4	4	3	(Együtt)				0	39
25–30 Aug	Nézőpont	42	11	26	9	8	4	(Együtt)				0	16
5–12 Aug	Ipsos	49	18	19	3	5	3	(Együtt)				3	30
22–25 Jul	Századvég	53	12	18	4	7	4	(Együtt)				2	35
21–24 Jul	Nézőpont	41	13	23	8	8	6	(Együtt)				1	18
16–22 Jul	Tárki	55	15	16	3	4	6	(Együtt)				2	39
13–21 Jul	Ipsos	56	15	16	4	3	3	(Együtt)				3	40
12–18 Jul	Iránytű	51	10	19	5	7	6	(Együtt)				2	32
16–18 Jun	Nézőpont	47	14	19	7	7	6	(Együtt)				0	28
11–17 Jun	Tárki	56	16	15	4	6	4	(Együtt)				1	40
6–13 Jun	Ipsos	57	10	18	4	6	4	(Együtt)				1	39
**25 May**	**EP Election**	51.5	**10.9**	**14.7**	**5.0**	**9.8**	**7.3**	**(Együtt)**	**(Did not run)**	**(Did not run)**	**(Did not exist)**	**0.9**	**36.8**
14–18 May	Nézőpont	46	17	15	8	6	6	(Együtt)	0			2	29
7–15 May	Tárki	55	15	16	4	4	3	(Együtt)	0			3	39
6–13 May	Ipsos	56	16	17	3	4	3	(Együtt)	0			1	39
6–8 May	Nézőpont	46	15	15	10	4	10	(Együtt)	0			0	31
25–29 Apr	Medián	56	14	17	4	2	4	(Együtt)	0			3	39
**6 Apr 2014**	**National Election**	44.9	**25.6**	**20.2**	**5.3**	**(Unity)**	**(Unity)**	**(Unity)**	**(Unity)**	**(Did not run)**	**(Did not exist)**	**4.0**	**19.3**

== Constituency polls ==
Bács-Kiskun 01. OEVK - Kecskemét
Fieldwork date	Polling firm	Fidesz-KDNP	Dialogue	Jobbik	LMP	DK	Together	MKKP	Momentum	Lead
Fieldwork date	Polling firm	László Salacz	-	Zoltán Lejer	Gábor Vágó	Rita Kopping	-	Szabolcs Kordik^{w/d}	Koppány Szarvas	Lead
Mar 2018	Republikon	50	-	18	18	8	-	-	-	32
2017	Iránytű	52	-	20	5	16	1	3	2	32

Bács-Kiskun 02. OEVK - Kecskemét
Fieldwork date	Polling firm	Fidesz-KDNP	Dialogue	Jobbik	LMP	DK	Together	MKKP	Momentum	Lead
Fieldwork date	Polling firm	Gábor Zombor	József Király	Tivadar Radics	Szilárd Tóth	-	-	Szabolcs Szentesi^{w/d}	Alexandra Bodrozsán	Lead
Mar 2018	Republikon	53	17	19	5	-	-	-	-	34
2017	Iránytű	47	15	20	7	-	2	4	5	27

Bács-Kiskun 03. OEVK - Kalocsa
Fieldwork date	Polling firm	Fidesz-KDNP	Dialogue	Jobbik	LMP	DK	Together	MKKP	Momentum	Lead
Fieldwork date	Polling firm	Sándor Font	Gabriella Angeli	Krisztián Suhajda	Rezső Kerpács	-	-	-	Balázs Környei	Lead
Mar 2018	Republikon	50	19	20	5	-	-	-	-	30
2017	Iránytű	49	16	26	5	-	0	2	1	23

Bács-Kiskun 04. OEVK - Kiskunfélegyháza
Fieldwork date	Polling firm	Fidesz-KDNP	Dialogue	Jobbik	LMP	DK	Together	MKKP	Momentum	Lead
Fieldwork date	Polling firm	Sándor Lezsák	Tamás Horváth	László Kollár	Kálmán Kis-Szeniczey	-	-	Sándor Bodor	Péter Tabajdi	Lead
Mar 2018	Republikon	53	17	19	5	-	-	-	-	34
2017	Iránytű	54	12	26	3	-	0	2	2	28

Bács-Kiskun 05. OEVK - Kiskunhalas
Fieldwork date	Polling firm	Fidesz-KDNP	Dialogue	Jobbik	LMP	DK	Together	MKKP	Momentum	Lead
Fieldwork date	Polling firm	Gábor Bányai	-	Gergely Farkas	Melánia Midi	László Molnár	-	-	Zoltán Takács	Lead
Mar 2018	Republikon	52	-	22	4	18	-	-	-	30
2017	Iránytű	49	-	29	3	14	0	1	1	20

Bács-Kiskun 06. OEVK - Baja
Fieldwork date	Polling firm	Fidesz-KDNP	Dialogue	Jobbik	LMP	DK	Together	MKKP	Momentum	Lead
Fieldwork date	Polling firm	Róbert Zsigó	Miklós Hajdú	Zoltán Grünfelder	István Ikotity	-	-	-	Kornél Béri	Lead
Mar 2018	Republikon	48	24	15	7	-	-	-	-	24
2017	Iránytű	51	17	22	4	-	2	3	0	29

Baranya 01. OEVK - Pécs
Fieldwork date	Polling firm	Fidesz-KDNP	Dialogue	Jobbik	LMP	DK	Together	MKKP	Momentum	Independent	Lead
Fieldwork date	Polling firm	Péter Csizi	-	Gábor Fogarasi	Lóránt Keresztes	-	-	Richárd Nagy	Balázs Nemes	Tamás Mellár	Lead
Mar 2018	Republikon	37	-	10	7	-	-	-	-	41	4
Feb 2018	ZRI	40	-	15	13	-	-	-	4	28	12
2017	Iránytű	39	-	24	8	-	2	0	4	21	15

Baranya 02. OEVK - Pécs
Fieldwork date	Polling firm	Fidesz-KDNP	Dialogue	Jobbik	LMP	DK	Together	MKKP	Momentum	Lead
Fieldwork date	Polling firm	Péter Hoppál	-	Gábor Gyimesi	Krisztina Hohn	Ferenc Nagy	Balázs Berkecz	Csongor Martos	Attila Körömi	Lead
Mar 2018	Republikon	35	-	13	6	41	-	-	-	6
Feb 2018	Medián	38	-	17	13	21	9	-	2	17
2017	Iránytű	42	-	20	8	25	1	1	2	17

Baranya 03. OEVK - Mohács
Fieldwork date	Polling firm	Fidesz-KDNP	Dialogue	Jobbik	LMP	DK	Together	MKKP	Momentum	Lead
Fieldwork date	Polling firm	János Hargitai	-	Norbert Szőcs	András Bosnyák	János Lukács	-	Zita Pincehelyi^{w/d}	Zita Jenei^{w/d}	Lead
Mar 2018	Republikon	50	-	18	7	21	-	-	-	29
2017	Iránytű	51	-	25	4	17	-	2	0	26

Baranya 04. OEVK - Szigetvár
Fieldwork date	Polling firm	Fidesz-KDNP	Dialogue	Jobbik	LMP	DK	Together	Momentum	MKKP	Lead
Fieldwork date	Polling firm	Csaba Nagy	Péter Vass	Alíz Andrics	Károly Angyal	Nándorné Mezei^{w/d}	Attila Rajnai	Attila Gergely	Petra Iván	Lead
Mar 2018	Republikon	45	25	19	5	-	-	-	-	20
Dec 2017	Republikon	54	22	13	9	-	-	3	-	32
Dec 2017	Republikon	52	14	15	5	5	5	2	1	38
2017	Iránytű	45	19	27	3	-	1	1	3	18

Békés 01. OEVK - Békéscsaba
Fieldwork date	Polling firm	Fidesz-KDNP	Dialogue	Jobbik	LMP	DK	Together	Momentum	MKKP	Lead
Fieldwork date	Polling firm	Tamás Herczeg	-	Tünde Kocziha	Katalin Kovács	Tibor Nagy-Huszein	-	István Almási	Péter Babinszki	Lead
Mar 2018	Iránytű	37	-	33	3	20	-	4	-	4
Mar 2018	Republikon	40	-	13	5	37	-	-	-	3
2017	Iránytű	36	-	28	5	23	0	4	3	8

Békés 02. OEVK - Békés
Fieldwork date	Polling firm	Fidesz-KDNP	Dialogue	Jobbik	LMP	DK	Together	MKKP	Momentum	Lead
Fieldwork date	Polling firm	Béla Dankó	-	Tamás Samu	Mihály Bencsik	Gábor Kondé	-	-	Bence Babinszki	Lead
Mar 2018	Republikon	47	-	24	6	18	-	-	-	23
2017	Iránytű	48	-	31	1	15	0	2	1	17

Békés 03. OEVK - Gyula
Fieldwork date	Polling firm	Fidesz-KDNP	Dialogue	Jobbik	LMP	DK	Together	MKKP	Momentum	Lead
Fieldwork date	Polling firm	József Kovács	László Pluhár	Géza Dévényi-Drabowski	László Szabó	-	-	-	Zoltán Nagy	Lead
Mar 2018	Republikon	50	23	18	4	-	-	-	-	27
2017	Iránytű	48	17	27	2	-	1	0	3	21

Békés 04. OEVK - Orosháza
Fieldwork date	Polling firm	Fidesz-KDNP	Dialogue	Jobbik	LMP	DK	Together	MKKP	Momentum	Lead
Fieldwork date	Polling firm	György Simonka	Sándor Füvesi	Ervin Szabó	Sándor Németh	-	Tamás Bod	-	Éva Sebők	Lead
Mar 2018	Republikon	46	22	21	5	-	-	-	-	24
2017	Iránytű	43	19	32	2	-	2	0	1	11

Borsod-Abaúj-Zemplén 01. OEVK - Miskolc
Fieldwork date	Polling firm	Fidesz-KDNP	Dialogue	Jobbik	LMP	DK	Together	MKKP	Momentum	Lead
Fieldwork date	Polling firm	Katalin Csöbör	-	Péter Jakab	László Csoma	József Debreczeni	László Papp^{w/d}	-	Tibor Szopkó	Lead
Mar 2018	Republikon	36	-	27	8	22	-	-	-	9
Feb 2018	ZRI	38	-	28	11	19	-	-	4	10
Feb 2018	ZRI	38	-	27	10	18	3	-	4	11
2017	Iránytű	34	-	32	4	25	1	1	2	2

Borsod-Abaúj-Zemplén 02. OEVK - Miskolc
Fieldwork date	Polling firm	Fidesz-KDNP	Dialogue	Jobbik	LMP	DK	Together	MKKP	Momentum	Lead
Fieldwork date	Polling firm	György Hubay	László Varga	Zoltán Pakusza	Botond Doszpoly^{w/d}	-	László Tóth^{w/d}	-	Norbert Dudás^{w/d}	Lead
Mar 2018	Iránytű	33	25	35	2	-	-	-	2	2
Mar 2018	Republikon	31	30	28	5	-	-	-	-	1
Dec 2017	Republikon	44	22	34	-	-	-	-	2	10
Dec 2017	Republikon	43	20	29	6	-	-	-	2	14
Dec 2017	Republikon	45	16	29	7	-	1	-	1	16
2017	Iránytű	29	26	35	4	-	1	2	2	6

Borsod-Abaúj-Zemplén 03. OEVK - Ózd
Fieldwork date	Polling firm	Fidesz-KDNP	Dialogue	Jobbik	LMP	DK	Together	MKKP	Momentum	Lead
Fieldwork date	Polling firm	Gábor Riz	-	Péter Farkas	István Koleszár	Gergő Varga	József Báder	-	József Kovács	Lead
Mar 2018	Republikon	40	-	37	2	17	-	-	-	3
2017	Iránytű	41	-	36	2	20	1	1	2	5

Borsod-Abaúj-Zemplén 04. OEVK - Kazincbarcika
Fieldwork date	Polling firm	Fidesz-KDNP	Dialogue	Jobbik	LMP	DK	Together	MKKP	Momentum	Lead
Fieldwork date	Polling firm	Zoltán Demeter	Nándor Gúr	Zsolt Egyed	Gábor Üveges	-	-	-	Gyula Győri	Lead
Mar 2018	Republikon	39	27	26	3	-	-	-	-	12
2017	Iránytű	36	23	35	2	-	1	2	0	1

Borsod-Abaúj-Zemplén 05. OEVK - Sátoraljaújhely
Fieldwork date	Polling firm	Fidesz-KDNP	Dialogue	Jobbik	LMP	DK	Together	MKKP	Momentum	Lead
Fieldwork date	Polling firm	Richárd Hörcsik	-	Gergely Mikola	László Köteles	Tibor Zaveczki	Mihály Szabó	-	András Pencz	Lead
Mar 2018	Republikon	46	-	24	4	20	-	-	-	22
Mar 2018	Iránytű	40	-	27	12	17	-	-	1	13
2017	Iránytű	41	-	27	7	22	0	1	1	14

Borsod-Abaúj-Zemplén 06. OEVK - Tiszaújváros
Fieldwork date	Polling firm	Fidesz-KDNP	Dialogue	Jobbik	LMP	DK	Together	MKKP	Momentum	Lead
Fieldwork date	Polling firm	Ferenc Koncz	Zsolt Pap	László Bíró	Gábor Tarnai	-	-	-	-	Lead
Mar 2018	Republikon	41	16	36	3	-	-	-	-	5
2017	Iránytű	39	18	38	3	-	0	0	2	1

Borsod-Abaúj-Zemplén 07. OEVK - Mezőkövesd
Fieldwork date	Polling firm	Fidesz-KDNP	Dialogue	Jobbik	LMP	DK	Together	MKKP	Momentum	Lead
Fieldwork date	Polling firm	András Tállai	Anna Kormos	Attila Lukács	Gyöngyi Ambrus	-	Tamás Kiss	-	-	Lead
Mar 2018	Republikon	48	18	26	3	-	-	-	-	22
2017	Iránytű	45	15	34	3	-	0	2	1	11

Budapest 01. OEVK - Districts: I., V., VIII., IX.
Fieldwork date	Polling firm	Fidesz-KDNP	Dialogue	Jobbik	LMP	DK	Together	MKKP	Momentum	Lead
Fieldwork date	Polling firm	István Hollik	Márta V. Naszályi^{w/d}	Pál Losonczy	Antal Csárdi	-	Péter Juhász^{w/d}	András Horváth	András Fekete-Győr^{w/d}	Lead
Mar 2018	Republikon	37	37	8	8	-	-	-	-	Tie
Feb 2018	Medián	44	-	14	43	-	-	-	-	1
Feb 2018	Medián	39	26	11	24	-	-	-	-	13
Feb 2018	Medián	37	23	10	16	-	-	-	13	14
Feb 2018	Medián	36	19	10	14	-	10	-	12	17
Dec 2017	Republikon	50	8	6	12	-	14	3	6	36
2017	Iránytű	46	14	9	9	-	2	8	12	32

Budapest 02. OEVK - Districts: XI.
Fieldwork date	Polling firm	Fidesz-KDNP	Dialogue	Jobbik	LMP	DK	Together	MKKP	Momentum	Lead
Fieldwork date	Polling firm	István Simicskó	-	András Bardócz-Tódor	Máté Kreitler-Sas	Erzsébet Gy. Németh	György Kóber^{w/d}	Roland Fischer	Dávid Bedő	Lead
Mar 2018	Republikon	41	-	6	7	40	-	-	-	1
2017	Iránytű	45	-	10	7	27	2	3	7	18

Budapest 03. OEVK - Districts: II., XII.
Fieldwork date	Polling firm	Fidesz-KDNP	Dialogue	Jobbik	LMP	DK	Together	MKKP	Momentum	Lead
Fieldwork date	Polling firm	Gergely Gulyás	-	Márton Gyöngyösi	Mária Hajdu	Tamás Bauer	Hajnal Bényi^{w/d}	Gergely Kovács	Barnabás Kádár	Lead
Mar 2018	Republikon	43	-	5	7	39	-	-	-	4
2017	Iránytű	45	-	7	9	22	3	2	11	23

Budapest 04. OEVK - Districts: II., III.
Fieldwork date	Polling firm	Fidesz-KDNP	Dialogue	Jobbik	LMP	DK	Together	MKKP	Momentum	Lead
Fieldwork date	Polling firm	Mihály Varga	-	Tamás Kovács	Péter Ungár	Péter Niedermüller	Zoltán Mihalik^{w/d}	Veronika Juhász	Márton Benedek	Lead
Mar 2018	Republikon	42	-	8	7	37	-	-	-	5
Feb 2018	ZRI	42	-	11	15	25	-	-	7	17
2017	Iránytű	41	-	9	8	20	1	6	13	21

Budapest 05. OEVK - Districts: VI., VII.
Fieldwork date	Polling firm	Fidesz-KDNP	Dialogue	Jobbik	LMP	DK	Together	MKKP	Momentum	Lead
Fieldwork date	Polling firm	István Bajkai	-	János Stummer	László Moldován	Lajos Oláh	Gábor Nyíri^{w/d}	Zsuzsanna Döme	Tamás Soproni^{w/d}	Lead
Mar 2018	Republikon	34	-	8	8	44	-	-	-	10
2017	Iránytű	32	-	16	8	22	4	8	8	10

Budapest 06. OEVK - Districts: VIII., IX.
Fieldwork date	Polling firm	Fidesz-KDNP	Dialogue	Jobbik	LMP	DK	Together	MKKP	Momentum	Lead
Fieldwork date	Polling firm	Máté Kocsis	-	Dóra Dúró	Tamás Jakabfy	Attila Ara-Kovács	Krisztina Baranyi	Gábor Racskó	Katalin Cseh	Lead
Mar 2018	Republikon	36	-	12	6	37	-	-	-	1
Mar 2018	Iránytű	45	-	16	10	17	6	-	3	28
Feb 2018	Medián	39	-	13	14	17	11	-	7	22
2017	Iránytű	35	-	17	12	25	2	2	6	10

Budapest 07. OEVK - Districts: XIII.
Fieldwork date	Polling firm	Fidesz-KDNP	Dialogue	Jobbik	LMP	DK	Together	MKKP	Momentum	Lead
Fieldwork date	Polling firm	Tamás Harrach	Dezső Hiszékeny	Adrián Magvasi	István Kerékgyártó	-	-	Ferenc Sebő	Miklós Hajnal	Lead
Mar 2018	Republikon	29	53	7	5	-	-	-	-	24
2017	Iránytű	24	35	11	6	-	3	8	13	11

Budapest 08. OEVK - Districts: XIV.
Fieldwork date	Polling firm	Fidesz-KDNP	Dialogue	Jobbik	LMP	DK	Together	MKKP	Momentum	Lead
Fieldwork date	Polling firm	Tamás Jelen	Csaba Tóth	István Szávay	János Barta^{w/d}	-	-	Zsolt Victora	Attila Szűcs	Lead
Mar 2018	Republikon	34	44	9	6	-	-	-	-	10
2017	Iránytű	36	25	13	10	-	3	4	7	11

Budapest 09. OEVK - Districts: X., XIX.
Fieldwork date	Polling firm	Fidesz-KDNP	Dialogue	Jobbik	LMP	DK	Together	MKKP	Momentum	Lead
Fieldwork date	Polling firm	István György	Sándor Burány	István Tubák	Márta Demeter	-	Attila Tábi^{w/d}	Klára Iván^{w/d}	Borbála Tölcsér	Lead
Mar 2018	Republikon	36	42	12	5	-	-	-	-	6
2017	Iránytű	37	23	17	5	-	5	4	8	14

Budapest 10. OEVK - Districts: III.
Fieldwork date	Polling firm	Fidesz-KDNP	Dialogue	Jobbik	LMP	DK	Together	MKKP	Momentum	Lead
Fieldwork date	Polling firm	Erzsébet Menczer	Tímea Szabó	Dániel Z. Kárpát	Júlia Ábrahám^{w/d}	-	Márton Pataki^{w/d}	Imre Tóth^{w/d}	Anna Donáth	Lead
Mar 2018	Republikon	34	42	11	6	-	-	-	-	8
2017	Iránytű	32	26	17	8	-	1	8	7	6

Budapest 11. OEVK - Districts: IV., XIII.
Fieldwork date	Polling firm	Fidesz-KDNP	Dialogue	Jobbik	LMP	DK	Together	MKKP	Momentum	Lead
Fieldwork date	Polling firm	Barna Zsigmond	-	Lórántné Hegedűs	Máté Kanász-Nagy	László Varju	-	Miklós Paizs	Tibor Molnár	Lead
Mar 2018	Republikon	34	-	11	6	44	-	-	-	10
2017	Iránytű	35	-	14	10	31	0	3	5	4

Budapest 12. OEVK - Districts: IV., XV.
Fieldwork date	Polling firm	Fidesz-KDNP	Dialogue	Jobbik	LMP	DK	Together	MKKP	Momentum	Lead
Fieldwork date	Polling firm	Tamás László	-	Géza Gyenes	László Szilvágyi	László Hajdu	Erzsébet Huzsvári^{w/d}	Attila Pálmai	Bianka Krisztics	Lead
Mar 2018	Republikon	37	-	13	5	40	-	-	-	3
2017	Iránytű	36	-	20	6	27	1	4	5	9

Budapest 13. OEVK - Districts: XIV., XVI.
Fieldwork date	Polling firm	Fidesz-KDNP	Dialogue	Jobbik	LMP	DK	Together	MKKP	Momentum	Lead
Fieldwork date	Polling firm	Kristóf Szatmáry	-	Marcell Tokody	László Mizsei	Gábor Nemes^{w/d}	Zoltán Vajda	-	Gábor Hollai^{w/d}	Lead
Mar 2018	Republikon	40	-	10	5	40	-	-	-	Tie
2017	Iránytű	42	24	15	6	-	5	3	5	18

Budapest 14. OEVK - Districts: X., XVII.
Fieldwork date	Polling firm	Fidesz-KDNP	Dialogue	Jobbik	LMP	DK	Together	MKKP	Momentum	Lead
Fieldwork date	Polling firm	Mónika Dunai	Károly Lukóczki	György Szilágyi	Erzsébet Schmuck	-	-	-	Endre Tóth	Lead
Mar 2018	Republikon	41	36	12	5	-	-	-	-	5
2017	Iránytű	36	26	18	7	-	0	3	9	10

Budapest 15. OEVK - District: XVIII.
Fieldwork date	Polling firm	Fidesz-KDNP	Dialogue	Jobbik	LMP	DK	Together	MKKP	Momentum	Lead
Fieldwork date	Polling firm	László Kucsák	Ágnes Kunhalmi	Tibor Makai	Dániel Kassai^{w/d}	-	Péter Mérő^{w/d}	-	Károly Nagy^{w/d}	Lead
Mar 2018	Republikon	34	47	15	-	-	-	-	-	13
Feb 2018	ZRI	38	42	20	-	-	-	-	-	4
Feb 2018	ZRI	34	32	17	17	-	-	-	-	2
Feb 2018	ZRI	34	31	16	16	-	-	-	3	3
Feb 2018	ZRI	34	30	16	14	-	3	-	3	4
2017	Iránytű	33	28	23	7	-	0	4	4	5

Budapest 16. OEVK - Districts: XIX., XX.
Fieldwork date	Polling firm	Fidesz-KDNP	Dialogue	Jobbik	LMP	DK	Together	MKKP	Momentum	Lead
Fieldwork date	Polling firm	Gyula Földesi	István Hiller	János Bencsik	István Ferenczi	-	Klára Somodi^{w/d}	-	Dalma Teveli	Lead
Mar 2018	Republikon	35	41	14	4	-	-	-	-	6
2017	Iránytű	32	27	20	8	-	1	6	4	5

Budapest 17. OEVK - Districts: XXI., XXIII.
Fieldwork date	Polling firm	Fidesz-KDNP	Dialogue	Jobbik	LMP	DK	Together	MKKP	Momentum	Lead
Fieldwork date	Polling firm	Szilárd Németh	Ildikó Borbély^{w/d}	Miklós Bereczki	András Tenk^{w/d}	-	Szabolcs Szabó	Szilvia Soltész	András Dukán^{w/d}	Lead
Mar 2018	Republikon	33	36	18	6	-	-	-	-	3
Mar 2018	ZRI	40	-	26	-	-	34	-	-	6
Mar 2018	ZRI	34	18	20	15	-	13	-	-	14
Mar 2018	ZRI	32	18	20	14	-	12	-	3	12
2017	Iránytű	35	26	21	4	-	2	5	5	9

Budapest 18. OEVK - District: XI., XXII.
Fieldwork date	Polling firm	Fidesz-KDNP	Dialogue	Jobbik	LMP	DK	Together	MKKP	Momentum	Lead
Fieldwork date	Polling firm	Zsolt Németh	Gyula Molnár	Gábor Staudt	Dániel Pitz	-	Nóra Hajdu^{w/d}	Antal Hotz	Anna Orosz	Lead
Mar 2018	Republikon	39	37	11	5	-	-	-	-	2
Feb 2018	ZRI	42	31	12	10	-	-	-	5	11
Feb 2018	ZRI	42	26	12	9	-	8	-	4	16
2017	Iránytű	38	23	12	7	-	2	4	10	15

Csongrád 01. OEVK - Szeged
Fieldwork date	Polling firm	Fidesz-KDNP	Dialogue	Jobbik	LMP	DK	Together	MKKP	Momentum	Lead
Fieldwork date	Polling firm	Csaba Bartók	Sándor Szabó	Péter Tóth	Zoltán Bodrog	-	-	Anna Pál	Edvin Mihálik	Lead
Mar 2018	Republikon	34	43	11	5	-	-	-	-	9
Feb 2018	ZRI	35	27	20	9	-	-	-	8	8
2017	Iránytű	35	38	16	6	-	0	1	4	3

Csongrád 02. OEVK - Szeged
Fieldwork date	Polling firm	Fidesz-KDNP	Dialogue	Jobbik	LMP	DK	Together	MKKP	Momentum	Lead
Fieldwork date	Polling firm	László B. Nagy	Márton Joób	István Fackelmann	Judit Tessényi	-	János Györgyey	Rozalinda Pose	Gergely Boros-Gyevi	Lead
Mar 2018	Republikon	42	38	9	5	-	-	-	-	4
2017	Iránytű	43	22	20	6	-	0	4	4	21

Csongrád 03. OEVK - Szentes
Fieldwork date	Polling firm	Fidesz-KDNP	Dialogue	Jobbik	LMP	DK	Together	MKKP	Momentum	Lead
Fieldwork date	Polling firm	Sándor Farkas	-	Zoltán Szabó	Viktor D'Elia	Mátyás Eörsi	Gábor Dombi	-	Barnabás Hegedűs	Lead
Mar 2018	Iránytű	45	-	30	4	16	-	-	2	15
Mar 2018	Republikon	46	-	22	6	20	-	-	-	24
2017	Iránytű	48	-	29	2	16	0	3	1	19

Csongrád 04. OEVK - Hódmezővásárhely
Fieldwork date	Polling firm	Fidesz-KDNP	Dialogue	Jobbik	LMP	DK	Together	MKKP	Momentum	Lead
Fieldwork date	Polling firm	János Lázár	István Rója	Attila Kiss	Gergely Pongrácz	-	-	Tamás Farkas	Tamás Jakab^{w/d}	Lead
Mar 2018	Republikon	43	19	22	10	-	-	-	-	21
Mar 2018	Iránytű	43	15	33	3	-	-	-	2	10
2017	Iránytű	41	15	31	6	-	1	1	2	10

Fejér 01. OEVK - Székesfehérvár
Fieldwork date	Polling firm	Fidesz-KDNP	Dialogue	Jobbik	LMP	DK	Together	MKKP	Momentum	Lead
Fieldwork date	Polling firm	Tamás Vargha	-	Nóra Tóth	Judit Rákosi	Judit Földi	-	-	András Pintér^{w/d}	Lead
Mar 2018	Republikon	42	-	10	4	38	-	-	-	4
2017	Iránytű	52	-	18	6	22	0	4	7	30

Fejér 02. OEVK - Székesfehérvár
Fieldwork date	Polling firm	Fidesz-KDNP	Dialogue	Jobbik	LMP	DK	Together	MKKP	Momentum	Lead
Fieldwork date	Polling firm	Gábor Törő	András Horváth	Attila Fazakas	László Perneczky	-	-	-	Péter Tóth	Lead
Mar 2018	Republikon	50	18	20	6	-	-	-	-	30
2017	Iránytű	44	14	20	4	-	1	4	1	24

Fejér 03. OEVK - Bicske
Fieldwork date	Polling firm	Fidesz-KDNP	Dialogue	Jobbik	LMP	DK	Together	MKKP	Momentum	Lead
Fieldwork date	Polling firm	Zoltán Tessely	László Szilágyi	László Varga	Ildikó Szatmári	-	-	-	Dániel Molnár	Lead
Mar 2018	Republikon	49	20	16	9	-	-	-	-	29
2017	Iránytű	54	22	15	4	-	1	2	2	32

Fejér 04. OEVK - Dunaújváros
Fieldwork date	Polling firm	Fidesz-KDNP	Dialogue	Jobbik	LMP	DK	Together	MKKP	Momentum	Lead
Fieldwork date	Polling firm	Dénes Galambos	-	Tamás Pintér	István Illéssy	Zsolt Mezei	Zoltán Mihalik^{w/d}	-	Róbert Kaszó	Lead
Mar 2018	Republikon	38	-	27	6	23	-	-	-	11
Mar 2018	Iránytű	38	-	34	4	19	-	-	2	4
Feb 2018	Medián	41	-	32	7	17	-	-	3	9
Feb 2018	Medián	41	-	31	6	15	4	-	3	10
2017	Iránytű	38	-	30	5	24	0	1	1	8

Fejér 05. OEVK - Sárbogárd
Fieldwork date	Polling firm	Fidesz-KDNP	Dialogue	Jobbik	LMP	DK	Together	MKKP	Momentum	Lead
Fieldwork date	Polling firm	Gábor Varga	-	János Árgyelán	Péter Lapos	Ilona Nyúli	Viktor Szigetvári	-	Zoltán Bálint^{w/d}	Lead
Mar 2018	Republikon	49	-	28	4	15	-	-	-	21
Mar 2018	Iránytű	44	-	36	2	14	-	-	-	8
2017	Iránytű	45	-	32	3	14	2	0	2	13

Győr-Moson-Sopron 01. OEVK - Győr
Fieldwork date	Polling firm	Fidesz-KDNP	Dialogue	Jobbik	LMP	DK	Together	MKKP	Momentum	Lead
Fieldwork date	Polling firm	Róbert Simon	-	Roland Fodor	Ferenc Jenei	Tímea Glázer	Márk Varga^{w/d}	-	József Molnár	Lead
Mar 2018	Republikon	47	-	13	8	26	-	-	-	21
2017	Iránytű	59	-	17	5	14	0	0	4	42

Győr-Moson-Sopron 02. OEVK - Győr
Fieldwork date	Polling firm	Fidesz-KDNP	Dialogue	Jobbik	LMP	DK	Together	MKKP	Momentum	Lead
Fieldwork date	Polling firm	Ákos Kara	András Greguss	Miklós Menyhárt	András Takács	-	-	-	Norbert Liszi	Lead
Mar 2018	Republikon	53	19	15	7	-	-	-	-	34
2017	Iránytű	52	14	21	5	-	0	4	3	31

Győr-Moson-Sopron 03. OEVK - Csorna
Fieldwork date	Polling firm	Fidesz-KDNP	Dialogue	Jobbik	LMP	DK	Together	MKKP	Momentum	Lead
Fieldwork date	Polling firm	Alpár Gyopáros	-	Zoltán Magyar	Ferenc Molnár	Zoltán Szabó	-	-	Zsaklin Budai	Lead
Mar 2018	Republikon	57	-	18	4	15	-	-	-	39
2017	Iránytű	53	-	25	4	13	0	3	1	28

Győr-Moson-Sopron 04. OEVK - Sopron
Fieldwork date	Polling firm	Fidesz-KDNP	Dialogue	Jobbik	LMP	DK	Together	MKKP	Momentum	Lead
Fieldwork date	Polling firm	Attila Barcza	Roland Póczik	Koloman Brenner	Gyula Szakács	-	-	József Tichy-Rács	Tünde Holzhofer	Lead
Mar 2018	Republikon	48	22	15	9	-	-	-	-	26
2017	Iránytű	46	18	21	6	-	0	5	3	25

Győr-Moson-Sopron 05. OEVK - Mosonmagyaróvár
Fieldwork date	Polling firm	Fidesz-KDNP	Dialogue	Jobbik	LMP	DK	Together	MKKP	Momentum	Lead
Fieldwork date	Polling firm	István Nagy	Zsolt Bogyai	Miklós Jávor	Bálint Goda	-	Károly Deschelák	Péter Nagy	Csanád Maróti	Lead
Mar 2018	Republikon	49	20	17	8	-	-	-	-	29
2017	Iránytű	51	16	23	4	-	1	3	2	28

Hajdú-Bihar 01. OEVK - Debrecen
Fieldwork date	Polling firm	Fidesz-KDNP	Dialogue	Jobbik	LMP	DK	Together	MKKP	Momentum	Lead
Fieldwork date	Polling firm	Lajos Kósa	Zita Gurmai	Róbert Herpergel	Mátyás Murguly	-	István Szegedi^{w/d}	-	Zoltán Horváth	Lead
Mar 2018	Republikon	46	24	15	8	-	-	-	-	22
2017	Iránytű	46	18	15	10	-	2	3	6	28

Hajdú-Bihar 02. OEVK - Debrecen
Fieldwork date	Polling firm	Fidesz-KDNP	Dialogue	Jobbik	LMP	DK	Together	MKKP	Momentum	Lead
Fieldwork date	Polling firm	László Pósán	-	Ábel Kőszeghy	Jenő Görög	Zoltán Varga	Tamás Orosz	István Szabados	László Mándi	Lead
Mar 2018	Republikon	44	-	20	8	21	-	-	-	23
2017	Iránytű	45	-	23	3	17	4	3	3	22

Hajdú-Bihar 03. OEVK - Debrecen
Fieldwork date	Polling firm	Fidesz-KDNP	Dialogue	Jobbik	LMP	DK	Together	MKKP	Momentum	Lead
Fieldwork date	Polling firm	László Tasó	-	József Csikai	Tamás Kiss	István Káposznyák	Mihály Kosztin	-	Árpád Lakatos	Lead
Mar 2018	Republikon	52	-	23	4	16	-	-	-	29
2017	Iránytű	52	-	28	4	12	0	1	2	24

Hajdú-Bihar 04. OEVK - Berettyóújfalu
Fieldwork date	Polling firm	Fidesz-KDNP	Dialogue	Jobbik	LMP	DK	Together	MKKP	Momentum	Lead
Fieldwork date	Polling firm	István Vitányi	Mária Gál	Gergő Keresztesy	Imre Majoros	-	Tamás Rutz^{w/d}	-	György Buzinkay	Lead
Mar 2018	Republikon	47	18	26	4	-	-	-	-	21
2017	Iránytű	53	12	31	2	-	0	0	1	22

Hajdú-Bihar 05. OEVK - Hajdúszoboszló
Fieldwork date	Polling firm	Fidesz-KDNP	Dialogue	Jobbik	LMP	DK	Together	MKKP	Momentum	Lead
Fieldwork date	Polling firm	Sándor Bodó	Tamás Dede	István Rigán	Péter Radics	-	Zoltán Szemők	-	Imre Kovács	Lead
Mar 2018	Republikon	46	18	26	4	-	-	-	-	20
2017	Iránytű	51	13	30	2	-	0	-	1	21

Hajdú-Bihar 06. OEVK - Hajdúböszörmény
Fieldwork date	Polling firm	Fidesz-KDNP	Dialogue	Jobbik	LMP	DK	Together	MKKP	Momentum	Lead
Fieldwork date	Polling firm	István Tiba	Tamás Csige	Pál Demeter	Tamás Tóth	-	-	-	Roland Kovács	Lead
Mar 2018	Republikon	48	17	25	4	-	-	-	-	23
2017	Iránytű	47	13	31	5	-	2	1	1	16

Heves 01. OEVK - Eger
Fieldwork date	Polling firm	Fidesz-KDNP	Dialogue	Jobbik	LMP	DK	Together	MKKP	Momentum	Lead
Fieldwork date	Polling firm	Zsolt Nyitrai	-	Ádám Mirkóczki	Csaba Komlósi	Noémi Kormos	-	Zoltán Várady	Zoltán Tóth^{w/d}	Lead
Mar 2018	Iránytű	41	-	35	2	19	-	-	1	6
Mar 2018	Republikon	38	-	25	7	24	-	-	-	13
Mar 2018	Nézőpont	52	-	16	3	10	-	-	1	36
2017	Iránytű	41	-	29	5	19	1	2	2	12

Heves 02. OEVK - Gyöngyös
Fieldwork date	Polling firm	Fidesz-KDNP	Dialogue	Jobbik	LMP	DK	Together	MKKP	Momentum	Lead
Fieldwork date	Polling firm	László Horváth	Bálint Orosz	Gábor Vona	János Reichenberger	-	Ágnes Réz	-	Béla Bakó^{w/d}	Lead
Mar 2018	Iránytű	45	12	38	3	-	-	-	-	7
Mar 2018	Republikon	37	15	41	3	-	-	-	-	4
Dec 2017	Republikon	51	18	26	3	-	1	-	0	25
2017	Iránytű	37	16	42	2	-	1	1	1	5

Heves 03. OEVK - Hatvan
Fieldwork date	Polling firm	Fidesz-KDNP	Dialogue	Jobbik	LMP	DK	Together	MKKP	Momentum	Lead
Fieldwork date	Polling firm	Zsolt Szabó	Norbert Tóth	Tamás Sneider	Norbert Tóth	-	-	-	Tibor Déri	Lead
Mar 2018	Republikon	42	15	36	2	-	-	-	-	6
Mar 2018	Iránytű	43	16	34	2	-	-	-	1	9
2017	Iránytű	44	21	30	3	-	0	1	1	14

Jász-Nagykun-Szolnok 01. OEVK - Szolnok
Polling firm	Polling firm	Fidesz-KDNP	Dialogue	Jobbik	LMP	DK	Together	MKKP	Momentum	Lead
Polling firm	Polling firm	Mária Kállai	Mihály Győrfi	Attila Csikós	István Kelemen	-	Attila Nagy^{w/d}	-	Éva Szekeres	Lead
Mar 2018	Medián	38	20	27	7	-	4	-	3	11
Mar 2018	Republikon	37	27	23	7	-	-	-	-	10
2017	Iránytű	40	22	28	4	-	1	2	2	12

Jász-Nagykun-Szolnok 02. OEVK - Jászberény
Fieldwork date	Polling firm	Fidesz-KDNP	Dialogue	Jobbik	LMP	DK	Together	MKKP	Momentum	Lead
Fieldwork date	Polling firm	János Pócs	-	Lóránt Budai	Béla Eszes	József Gedei	Imre Urbán	-	István Pálffy	Lead
Mar 2018	Republikon	44	-	28	4	19	-	-	-	16
2017	Iránytű	43	-	35	2	16	1	1	1	8

Jász-Nagykun-Szolnok 03. OEVK - Karcag
Fieldwork date	Polling firm	Fidesz-KDNP	Dialogue	Jobbik	LMP	DK	Together	MKKP	Momentum	Lead
Fieldwork date	Polling firm	Sándor Kovács	-	László Lukács	Benedek Sallai	Jánosné Bodó	-	-	Richárd Mikle	Lead
Mar 2018	Republikon	52	-	24	3	16	-	-	-	28
2017	Iránytű	49	-	32	3	14	0	1	1	17

Jász-Nagykun-Szolnok 04. OEVK - Törökszentmiklós
Fieldwork date	Polling firm	Fidesz-KDNP	Dialogue	Jobbik	LMP	DK	Together	MKKP	Momentum	Lead
Fieldwork date	Polling firm	István Boldog	Endre Rózsa	Tamás Csányi	Virág Ecseki	-	-	-	Károly Matisz	Lead
Mar 2018	Republikon	43	14	36	3	-	-	-	-	7
2017	Iránytű	43	18	34	3	-	0	0	1	9

Komárom-Esztergom 01. OEVK - Tatabánya
Fieldwork date	Polling firm	Fidesz-KDNP	Dialogue	Jobbik	LMP	DK	Together	MKKP	Momentum	Lead
Fieldwork date	Polling firm	János Bencsik	Miklós Fekete	Bánk Boda	Menyhért Körtvélyfáy	-	-	Alexandra Barna	László Novák	Lead
Mar 2018	Republikon	42	39	10	4	-	-	-	-	3
2017	Iránytű	39	23	24	6	-	1	3	4	15

Komárom-Esztergom 02. OEVK - Esztergom
Fieldwork date	Polling firm	Fidesz-KDNP	Dialogue	Jobbik	LMP	DK	Together	MKKP	Momentum	Lead
Fieldwork date	Polling firm	Pál Völner	-	Tibor Nunkovics	Béla Munkácsy	Ágnes Vadai	-	László Papp	-	Lead
Mar 2018	Republikon	45	-	18	7	26	-	-	-	19
9-11 Mar	Iránytű	40	-	28	7	21	-	-	-	12
2017	Iránytű	41	-	26	6	22	0	2	2	15

Komárom-Esztergom 03. OEVK - Komárom
Fieldwork date	Polling firm	Fidesz-KDNP	Dialogue	Jobbik	LMP	DK	Together	MKKP	Momentum	Lead
Fieldwork date	Polling firm	Judit Bertalan	Jöran Sólyom	Endre Tóth	Gábor Talabér	-	-	Dávid Velki	Béla Lakatos	Lead
Mar 2018	Republikon	46	23	18	7	-	-	-	-	23
2017	Iránytű	45	21	26	2	-	0	2	3	19

Nógrád 01. OEVK - Salgótarján
Fieldwork date	Polling firm	Fidesz-KDNP	Dialogue	Jobbik	LMP	DK	Together	MKKP	Momentum	Lead
Fieldwork date	Polling firm	Károly Becsó	-	István Cseresznyés	Gábor Dömsödi	Zoltán Kovács	Nóra Nógrádi	Mona Betes	Csaba Tóth	Lead
Mar 2018	Medián	41	-	20	19	16	3	-	2	21
Mar 2018	Republikon	41	-	21	21	12	-	-	-	20
Mar 2018	Iránytű	40	-	28	7	21	-	-	-	12
2017	Iránytű	47	-	24	3	22	0	1	1	23

Nógrád 02. OEVK - Balassagyarmat
Fieldwork date	Polling firm	Fidesz-KDNP	Dialogue	Jobbik	LMP	DK	Together	MKKP	Momentum	Lead
Fieldwork date	Polling firm	Mihály Balla	Andrea Szerémy	Lénárd Dobrocsi	Szilárd Gyenes	-	-	-	-	Lead
Mar 2018	Republikon	50	20	21	5	-	-	-	-	30
2017	Iránytű	57	13	23	3	-	1	1	1	34

Pest 01. OEVK - Érd
Fieldwork date	Polling firm	Fidesz-KDNP	Dialogue	Jobbik	LMP	DK	Together	MKKP	Momentum	Lead
Fieldwork date	Polling firm	András Aradszki	László Csőzik	Sebestyén Vágó	Szabolcs Turcsán	-	-	Barbara Szécsi	Alex Gál	Lead
Mar 2018	Republikon	42	39	10	4	-	-	-	-	3
2017	Iránytű	42	20	20	6	-	2	3	4	22

Pest 02. OEVK - Budakeszi
Fieldwork date	Polling firm	Fidesz-KDNP	Dialogue	Jobbik	LMP	DK	Together	MKKP	Momentum	Lead
Fieldwork date	Polling firm	Zsolt Csenger-Zalán	-	Tímea Kollár	Bernadett Szél	Zoltán Tóth^{w/d}	-	Csaba Betlehem	Áron Szemző^{w/d}	Lead
Mar 2018	Republikon	45	-	9	42	-	-	-	-	3
Feb 2018	ZRI	49	-	20	30	-	-	-	-	19
Feb 2018	ZRI	48	-	20	26	-	-	-	6	22
Feb 2018	ZRI	46	-	17	20	12	-	-	5	26
2017	Iránytű	47	-	17	5	19	2	5	4	28

Pest 03. OEVK - Szentendre
Fieldwork date	Polling firm	Fidesz-KDNP	Dialogue	Jobbik	LMP	DK	Together	MKKP	Momentum	Lead
Fieldwork date	Polling firm	Sándor Hadházy	-	Gábor Pál	Zsolt Drávucz	Miklós Király	Judit Spät	Miklós Kövesdi	Judit Vásáhelyi	Lead
Mar 2018	Republikon	46	-	12	11	24	-	-	-	22
2017	Iránytű	52	-	16	5	16	1	3	7	36

Pest 04. OEVK - Vác
Fieldwork date	Polling firm	Fidesz-KDNP	Dialogue	Jobbik	LMP	DK	Together	MKKP	Momentum	Lead
Fieldwork date	Polling firm	Bence Rétvári	-	Zsolt Fehér	Ilona Matkovich	István Krauze^{w/d}	Zoltán Jakab	-	Béla Juhász	Lead
Mar 2018	Republikon	46	-	18	6	23	-	-	-	23
2017	Iránytű	52	-	20	5	15	0	3	4	32

Pest 05. OEVK - Dunakeszi
Fieldwork date	Polling firm	Fidesz-KDNP	Dialogue	Jobbik	LMP	DK	Together	MKKP	Momentum	Lead
Fieldwork date	Polling firm	Bence Tuzson	-	Zoltán Varga	Csaba Kiss^{w/d}	Sándor Rónai	Nóra Vargha^{w/d}	-	Ákos Kohut	Lead
Mar 2018	Republikon	40	-	10	6	39	-	-	-	1
2017	Iránytű	42	-	19	5	22	1	4	6	20

Pest 06. OEVK - Gödöllő
Fieldwork date	Polling firm	Fidesz-KDNP	Dialogue	Jobbik	LMP	DK	Together	MKKP	Momentum	Lead
Fieldwork date	Polling firm	László Vécsey	Zoltán Makrai	János Víg	Szilvia Lengyel	-	Imre Kis	Gábor Bősze	László Molnár	Lead
Mar 2018	Republikon	43	23	17	10	-	-	-	-	20
2017	Iránytű	49	17	19	6	-	0	4	4	30

Pest 07. OEVK - Vecsés
Fieldwork date	Polling firm	Fidesz-KDNP	Dialogue	Jobbik	LMP	DK	Together	MKKP	Momentum	Lead
Fieldwork date	Polling firm	Lajos Szűcs	-	Zoltán Sas	Klaudia Apostol	Andrea Nyeste	Judit Tóth	-	Bernadett Kalasovszky	Lead
Mar 2018	Republikon	43	-	18	7	26	-	-	-	17
Mar 2018	Iránytű	40	-	26	10	18	1	-	3	14
2017	Iránytű	38	-	23	7	25	1	1	3	13

Pest 08. OEVK - Szigetszentmiklós
Fieldwork date	Polling firm	Fidesz-KDNP	Dialogue	Jobbik	LMP	DK	Together	MKKP	Momentum	Lead
Fieldwork date	Polling firm	Zoltán Bóna	Zsolt Stefanik	János Lupa	Nikolett Danics	-	Magdolna Ketskeméty-Rády^{w/d}	-	József Tótok	Lead
Mar 2018	Republikon	39	40	11	4	-	-	-	-	1
2017	Iránytű	35	24	25	6	-	2	2	4	10

Pest 09. OEVK - Nagykáta
Fieldwork date	Polling firm	Fidesz-KDNP	Dialogue	Jobbik	LMP	DK	Together	MKKP	Momentum	Lead
Fieldwork date	Polling firm	György Czerván	Zsolt Török	József Bozsik	Sándor Szalay	-	Péter Mérő	-	Zoltán Kiss^{w/d}	Lead
Mar 2018	Republikon	50	18	23	5	-	-	-	-	27
2017	Iránytű	46	19	31	3	-	0	0	1	15

Pest 10. OEVK - Monor
Fieldwork date	Polling firm	Fidesz-KDNP	Dialogue	Jobbik	LMP	DK	Together	MKKP	Momentum	Lead
Fieldwork date	Polling firm	Tibor Pogácsás	Sándor Torzsa	Endre Lendvai	Ferenc Lutter	-	Roland Papp	-	Miklós Janzsó	Lead
Mar 2018	Republikon	46	20	23	5	-	-	-	-	23
2017	Iránytű	54	14	21	5	-	1	3	2	33

Pest 11. OEVK - Dabas
Fieldwork date	Polling firm	Fidesz-KDNP	Dialogue	Jobbik	LMP	DK	Together	MKKP	Momentum	Lead
Fieldwork date	Polling firm	Károly Pánczél	Sándor Kücsön	Péter Magyar	László Török	-	-	-	Péter Galgóczi^{w/d}	Lead
Mar 2018	Republikon	47	22	18	7	-	-	-	-	25
2017	Iránytű	50	16	25	4	-	1	1	2	25

Pest 12. OEVK - Cegléd
Fieldwork date	Polling firm	Fidesz-KDNP	Dialogue	Jobbik	LMP	DK	Together	MKKP	Momentum	Lead
Fieldwork date	Polling firm	László Földi	-	János Volner	Áron Földi	János Szüdi	-	Viktor Kis	Levente Mucsinyi	Lead
Mar 2018	Republikon	44	-	26	5	20	-	-	-	18
2017	Iránytű	43	-	33	2	17	1	2	1	10

Somogy 01. OEVK - Kaposvár
Fieldwork date	Polling firm	Fidesz-KDNP	Dialogue	Jobbik	LMP	DK	Together	MKKP	Momentum	Lead
Fieldwork date	Polling firm	Attila Gelencsér	-	Gábor Miháldinecz	József Busa	Imre László	Tibor Kerepesi	-	Dániel Berg	Lead
Mar 2018	Republikon	40	-	14	4	37	-	-	-	3
2017	Iránytű	46	-	22	4	21	1	2	4	24

Somogy 02. OEVK - Barcs
Fieldwork date	Polling firm	Fidesz-KDNP	Dialogue	Jobbik	LMP	DK	Together	MKKP	Momentum	Lead
Fieldwork date	Polling firm	László Szászfalvi	-	Balázs Ander	Zoltán Sipos	Gábor Remes	Lászlóné Gyertyás	-	-	Lead
Mar 2018	Republikon	48	-	23	4	21	-	-	-	25
2017	Iránytű	43	-	33	3	17	1	1	1	10

Somogy 03. OEVK - Marcali
Fieldwork date	Polling firm	Fidesz-KDNP	Dialogue	Jobbik	LMP	DK	Together	MKKP	Momentum	Lead
Fieldwork date	Polling firm	József Móring	Géza Mészáros	Ádám Steinmetz	Péter Filák	-	-	-	László Fábián^{w/d}	Lead
Mar 2018	Iránytű	40	15	40	2	-	-	-	-	Tie
Mar 2018	Republikon	47	22	22	5	-	-	-	-	25
2017	Iránytű	41	16	36	2	-	1	1	1	5

Somogy 04. OEVK - Siófok
Fieldwork date	Polling firm	Fidesz-KDNP	Dialogue	Jobbik	LMP	DK	Together	MKKP	Momentum	Lead
Fieldwork date	Polling firm	Mihály Witzmann	György Magyar	Anita Kőrösi	Ferenc Gál	-	Csaba Zsiga	-	Dávid Nagy	Lead
Mar 2018	Republikon	47	24	18	6	-	-	-	-	23
2017	Iránytű	46	18	27	5	-	1	1	1	19

Szabolcs-Szatmár-Bereg 01. OEVK - Nyíregyháza
Fieldwork date	Polling firm	Fidesz-KDNP	Dialogue	Jobbik	LMP	DK	Together	MKKP	Momentum	Lead
Fieldwork date	Polling firm	Tünde Szabó	Lászlóné Csabai	Máté Lengyel	György Szoboszlay	-	Csaba Lővei^{w/d}	Károly Vajas	György Babosi	Lead
Mar 2018	Republikon	37	28	22	7	-	-	-	-	9
Feb 2018	Medián	41	25	22	8	-	-	-	4	16
Feb 2018	Medián	40	23	21	8	-	4	-	4	17
2017	Iránytű	40	28	25	3	-	0	1	2	12

Szabolcs-Szatmár-Bereg 02. OEVK - Nyíregyháza
Fieldwork date	Polling firm	Fidesz-KDNP	Dialogue	Jobbik	LMP	DK	Together	MKKP	Momentum	Lead
Fieldwork date	Polling firm	Győző Vinnai	-	Erik Fülöp	Tamás Cselószki	László Helmeczy	Magdolna Ambrus^{w/d}	Andrea Kovács^{w/d}	Gábor Szántó	Lead
Mar 2018	Republikon	44	-	26	4	22	-	-	-	18
2017	Iránytű	41	-	33	2	20	1	1	1	8

Szabolcs-Szatmár-Bereg 03. OEVK - Kisvárda
Fieldwork date	Polling firm	Fidesz-KDNP	Dialogue	Jobbik	LMP	DK	Together	MKKP	Momentum	Lead
Fieldwork date	Polling firm	Miklós Seszták	-	Csaba Gyüre	István Makranczi	Dénesné Radóczki	Tímea Heczku^{w/d}	-	Rita Matejka	Lead
Mar 2018	Republikon	50	-	25	3	18	-	-	-	25
2017	Iránytű	49	-	28	2	18	0	1	1	21

Szabolcs-Szatmár-Bereg 04. OEVK - Vásárosnamény
Fieldwork date	Polling firm	Fidesz-KDNP	Dialogue	Jobbik	LMP	DK	Together	MKKP	Momentum	Lead
Fieldwork date	Polling firm	Attila Tilki	Miklós Bihari	Béla Adorján	József Tempfli	-	Bálint Jóczik	-	Márton Áncsán	Lead
Mar 2018	Republikon	54	15	25	2	-	-	-	-	29
2017	Iránytű	56	15	25	1	-	1	0	1	31

Szabolcs-Szatmár-Bereg 05. OEVK - Mátészalka
Fieldwork date	Polling firm	Fidesz-KDNP	Dialogue	Jobbik	LMP	DK	Together	MKKP	Momentum	Lead
Fieldwork date	Polling firm	Sándor Kovács	-	István Apáti	Sándor Tárkányi	Erika Rácz	-	-	Péter Magyar	Lead
Mar 2018	Republikon	51	-	25	2	17	-	-	-	26
2017	Iránytű	49	-	29	2	18	0	0	1	20

Szabolcs-Szatmár-Bereg 06. OEVK - Nyírbátor
Fieldwork date	Polling firm	Fidesz-KDNP	Dialogue	Jobbik	LMP	DK	Together	MKKP	Momentum	Lead
Fieldwork date	Polling firm	Miklós Simon	János Veres	Géza Kész	József Czimre	-	-	-	Tibor Bankus	Lead
Mar 2018	Republikon	48	19	26	2	-	-	-	-	22
2017	Iránytű	48	18	28	1	-	1	1	2	20

Tolna 01. OEVK - Szekszárd
Fieldwork date	Polling firm	Fidesz-KDNP	Dialogue	Jobbik	LMP	DK	Together	MKKP	Momentum	Lead
Fieldwork date	Polling firm	István Horváth	Tamás Harangozó^{w/d}	Balázs Szabó	Ákos Hadházy	-	-	Vendel Pest	Norbert Rácz^{w/d}	Lead
Mar 2018	Republikon	43	20	16	18	-	-	-	-	23
Feb 2018	ZRI	53	-	20	27	-	-	-	-	26
Feb 2018	ZRI	48	19	16	17	-	-	-	-	29
Feb 2018	ZRI	47	18	16	15	-	-	-	4	29
2017	Iránytű	48	13	20	11	-	1	0	4	28

Tolna 02. OEVK - Dombóvár
Fieldwork date	Polling firm	Fidesz-KDNP	Dialogue	Jobbik	LMP	DK	Together	MKKP	Momentum	Lead
Fieldwork date	Polling firm	Árpád Potápi	-	Csaba Fenyvesi	István Kretz	Szilvia Slárku	-	-	Csaba Sárdi	Lead
Mar 2018	Republikon	47	-	21	5	22	-	-	-	25
2017	Iránytű	52	-	24	4	15	1	1	1	28

Tolna 03. OEVK - Paks
Fieldwork date	Polling firm	Fidesz-KDNP	Dialogue	Jobbik	LMP	DK	Together	MKKP	Momentum	Lead
Fieldwork date	Polling firm	János Süli	Anita Heringes	János Bencze	Orsika Solymár	-	-	-	Norbert Dobosi	Lead
Mar 2018	Republikon	50	19	20	5	-	-	-	-	30
2017	Iránytű	49	15	26	4	-	1	2	2	23

Vas 01. OEVK - Szombathely
Fieldwork date	Polling firm	Fidesz-KDNP	Dialogue	Jobbik	LMP	DK	Together	MKKP	Momentum	Lead
Fieldwork date	Polling firm	Csaba Hende	András Nemény	Péter Balassa	Ákos Németh	-	Tamás Varga^{w/d}	Petra Pavelkovits	Péter Falta	Lead
Mar 2018	Republikon	41	37	11	5	-	-	-	-	4
Feb 2018	Medián	40	24	20	10	-	-	-	6	16
Feb 2018	Medián	40	22	18	9	-	6	-	5	18
2017	Iránytű	50	22	18	4	-	1	1	3	28

Vas 02. OEVK - Sárvár
Fieldwork date	Polling firm	Fidesz-KDNP	Dialogue	Jobbik	LMP	DK	Together	MKKP	Momentum	Lead
Fieldwork date	Polling firm	Péter Ágh	Attila Horváth	Kálmán Rába	István György	-	-	Gábor Szűcs^{w/d}	Attila Kovács	Lead
Mar 2018	Republikon	51	23	15	6	-	-	-	-	28
2017	Iránytű	57	15	20	3	-	1	1	2	37

Vas 03. OEVK - Körmend
Fieldwork date	Polling firm	Fidesz-KDNP	Dialogue	Jobbik	LMP	DK	Together	MKKP	Momentum	Lead
Fieldwork date	Polling firm	Zsolt V. Németh	-	Tibor Bana	András Bogáti	Tibor Balogh	-	-	Mária Gerencsér	Lead
Mar 2018	Republikon	56	-	20	5	14	-	-	-	36
2017	Iránytű	53	-	28	2	13	1	1	1	25

Veszprém 01. OEVK - Veszprém
Fieldwork date	Polling firm	Fidesz-KDNP	Dialogue	Jobbik	LMP	DK	Together	MKKP	Momentum	Independent	Lead
Fieldwork date	Polling firm	Péter Ovádi	-	Andrea Varga-Damm	Viktor Hites	-	-	Ákos Szimmer	János Meződi	Zoltán Kész	Lead
Mar 2018	Republikon	40	-	10	5	-	-	-	-	40	Tie
2017	Iránytű	45	22	21	4	-	3	-	0	0	23

Veszprém 02. OEVK - Balatonfüred
Fieldwork date	Polling firm	Fidesz-KDNP	Dialogue	Jobbik	LMP	DK	Together	MKKP	Momentum	Lead
Fieldwork date	Polling firm	Károly Kontrát	-	Lajos Kepli	Zoltán Ságodi^{w/d}	Istvánné Deák	-	-	László Kiss	Lead
Mar 2018	Republikon	45	-	24	-	25	-	-	-	20
Mar 2018	Iránytű	40	-	29	5	22	-	-	1	11
2017	Iránytű	39	-	26	7	23	1	1	2	13

Veszprém 03. OEVK - Tapolca
Fieldwork date	Polling firm	Fidesz-KDNP	Dialogue	Jobbik	LMP	DK	Together	MKKP	Momentum	Lead
Fieldwork date	Polling firm	Zoltán Fenyvesi	Lajos Kárpáti	Lajos Rig	Lajos Takács	-	Tibor Molnár^{w/d}	Márk Pavlovics	Éva Csernák^{w/d}	Lead
Mar 2018	Republikon	42	15	36	4	-	-	-	-	6
Feb 2018	Medián	42	19	33	5	-	-	-	-	9
Feb 2018	Medián	41	17	33	5	-	2	-	2	8
2017	Iránytű	41	17	36	2	-	1	1	1	5

Veszprém 04. OEVK - Pápa
Fieldwork date	Polling firm	Fidesz-KDNP	Dialogue	Jobbik	LMP	DK	Together	MKKP	Momentum	Lead
Fieldwork date	Polling firm	Zoltán Kovács	Zoltán Gőgös	Milán Töreki	Attila Tomán	-	-	-	Áron Iker	Lead
Mar 2018	Republikon	50	20	20	4		-	-	-	30
2017	Iránytű	52	12	30	2	-	2	1	1	22

Zala 01. OEVK - Zalaegerszeg
Fieldwork date	Polling firm	Fidesz-KDNP	Dialogue	Jobbik	LMP	DK	Together	MKKP	Momentum	Lead
Fieldwork date	Polling firm	László Vigh	Balázs Góra	Richárd Benke	Zoltán Paksy	-	-	-	Zsolt Fodor	Lead
Mar 2018	Republikon	45	23	20	7	-	-	-	-	22
2017	Iránytű	53	14	24	3	-	2	1	2	29

Zala 02. OEVK - Keszthely
Fieldwork date	Polling firm	Fidesz-KDNP	Dialogue	Jobbik	LMP	DK	Together	MKKP	Momentum	Lead
Fieldwork date	Polling firm	Jenő Manninger	-	Tamás Weller-Jakus	Tibor Temesvári	Viktória Kovács	-	-	István Elekes	Lead
Mar 2018	Republikon	48	-	22	6	18	-	-	-	26
2017	Iránytű	56	-	22	3	16	0	1	1	34

Zala 03. OEVK - Nagykanizsa
Fieldwork date	Polling firm	Fidesz-KDNP	Dialogue	Jobbik	LMP	DK	Together	MKKP	Momentum	Lead
Fieldwork date	Polling firm	Péter Cseresnyés	Csaba Fodor^{w/d}	László Zakó	Attila Károlyi	Jácint Horváth	János Jellinek^{w/d}	-	Tamás Polónyi	Lead
Mar 2018	Republikon	40	-	25	5	25	-	-	-	15
Mar 2018	Iránytű	44	-	28	4	19	-	-	2	16
Dec 2017	Republikon	46	-	23	5	20	-	-	6	23
Dec 2017	Republikon	47	12	22	5	6	2	-	4	25
2017	Iránytű	45	-	26	4	22	0	1	1	19

^{w/d} - Withdrawn candidate.

== Party preference by age group ==
Fieldwork date	Polling firm	Age group	Fidesz-KDNP	Left, Liberal	Jobbik	Other / Don't Know	Lead
3–14 Dec	Republikon	18-24	59	11	27	3	32
3–14 Dec	Republikon	25-44	50	16	29	5	21
3–14 Dec	Republikon	45-64	46	31	20	4	15
3–14 Dec	Republikon	65-	48	42	10	0	6
2016

== Preferred prime minister ==
Fieldwork date	Polling firm	Orbán	Botka	Vona	Szél	Gyurcsány	Karácsony	Fodor	Fekete-Győr	Other/Don't Know	Lead
19-23 Mar	Nézőpont	50	–	7	8	3	13	1	1	17	37
11-23 Jan	Tárki	50	–	9	4	4	9	–	–	24	41
2018
12–18 Dec	Századvég	52	–	8	11	–	13	–	–	16	39
2–6 Nov	Nézőpont	47	–	8	6	5	4	2	1	27	39
6–8 Jun	Nézőpont	43	3	8	5	5	6	1	–	29	35
9–11 May	Nézőpont	44	5	11	8	6	–	2	–	24	33
20–23 Jan	Nézőpont	37	7	8	3	5	–	2	–	38	30
2017

== See also ==
- Opinion polling for the 2022 Hungarian parliamentary election
