= Hans Kluge =

Belgian doctor (born 1968)

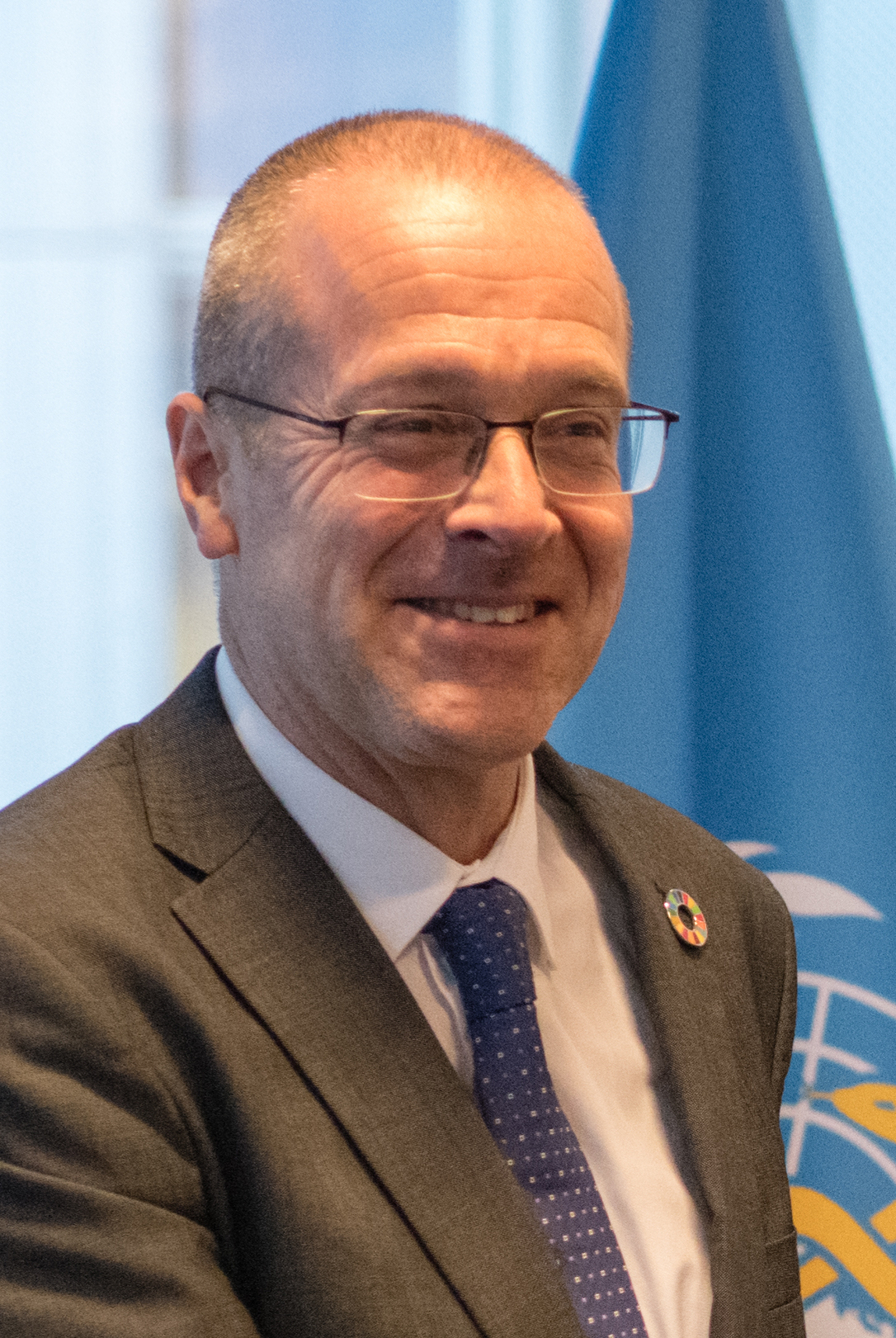
- Dr. Hans Kluge in 2024

Regional Director for Europe of the World Health Organization
- Incumbent
- Assumed office 1 February 2020
- Preceded by: Zsuzsanna Jakab

Personal details
- Education: KU Leuven

Hans Henri Marcel Paul Kluge (born 29 November 1968, in Roeselare) is a Belgian medical doctor and public health expert. As of 1 February 2020, he served as the World Health Organization Regional Director for Europe after being nominated in September 2019 by the WHO Regional Committee for Europe.

In 2019, Belgium proposed Kluge as a candidate for the position of WHO Regional Director for Europe.

As WHO Regional Director for Europe, Kluge introduced a new strategic vision for the WHO European Region, called "United action for better health". When introducing the vision, Kluge said, "Together, we must build a pan-European culture of health, where health and well-being goals guide public and private decision-making, and everyone can make healthy choices". This vision was translated into the European Programme of Work 2020-2025 (EPW), which was formally adopted by the Region in September 2020.

Kluge also initiated the Pan-European Commission on Health and Sustainable Development, an independent and interdisciplinary group of leaders convened to rethink policy priorities in the light of pandemics. In December 2021 Kluge said: "We can see another storm coming". In February Kluge said "This period of higher protection should be seen as a 'ceasefire' that could bring us enduring peace."

In June 2022, during the 2022 monkeypox outbreak, Kluge called on governments and the public to increase efforts to prevent the disease from extending its geographical reach.

In August 2026, he was proposed by Belgium as candidate for the post of WHO Director-General.

He qualified in medicine, surgery and obstetrics at KU Leuven in 1994.
