= Opinion polling for the 2022 Hungarian parliamentary election =

In the run up to the 2022 Hungarian parliamentary election, various organizations carry out opinion polling to gauge voting intention in Hungary. Results of such polls are displayed in this article.

== National polling results ==
=== United Opposition list ===
Fieldwork date	Polling firm	Sample size	Fidesz-KDNP	EM	MKKP	MH	Other	Lead
3 Apr 2022	National Election	–	54.1	34.4	3.3	5.8	2.1	16.3
30–31 Mar Apr 2022	Medián	1531	49	41	4.5	4.5	1	8
29–31 Mar 2022	Publicus	1025	47	47	2	3	1	Tie
28–30 Mar 2022	Társadalomkutató	1000	50	40	4	6	0	10
26–29 Mar 2022	Republikon	800	49.3	46.5	—N/a	—N/a	4.2	3.8
22–28 Mar 2022	IDEA	1800	50	45	2	3	0	5
21–27 Mar 2022	Századvég	1000	49	44	3	3	1	5
21–27 Mar 2022	Závecz Research	1000	50	46	1	3	0	4
24–26 Mar 2022	Medián	1096	50	40	4	4	2	10
23–25 Mar 2022	Nézőpont	1000	49.0	43.8	3.1	3.1	1	5.2
23–25 Mar 2022	Závecz Research	800	48.8	46.4	—N/a	—N/a	4.8	2.4
21–25 Mar 2022	Publicus	1000	48.2	45.9	2.4	2.4	1.2	2.3
22–24 Mar 2022	Real-PR 93	1000	49	41	3	5	2	8
21–23 Mar 2022	Társadalomkutató	1000	52	41	3	3	1	11
16–21 Mar 2022	Nézőpont	1000	51.5	43	3	2	0	8.5
16–18 Mar 2022	Republikon	1000	49	46	2	3	0	3
7–11 Mar 2022	Publicus	1001	48.5	45.5	1.4	2.9	1.4	3.0
2–11 Mar 2022	IDEA	2000	50	43	3	4	0	7
26 Feb–5 Mar 2022	e-benchmark	1000	54	46	—N/a	—N/a	—N/a	8
22–26 Feb 2022	Medián	1100	49	43	3	4	1	6
18–24 Feb 2022	Republikon	1000	48	46	3	3	0	2
14–16 Feb 2022	Nézőpont	1000	50	43	3	3	1	7
10–14 Feb 2022	Publicus	1000	45.7	48.5	1.4	2.8	1.4	2.8
9–11 Feb 2022	Real-PR 93	1000	54	41	2	3	0	13
2–10 Feb 2022	Závecz Research	1000	49	46	2	3	0	3
31 Jan–9 Feb 2022	IDEA	2000	49	44	3	4	0	5
24–26 Jan 2022	Társadalomkutató	1000	51	43	3	3	0	8
20–25 Jan 2022	Republikon	1000	47	47	3	3	0	Tie
17–19 Jan 2022	Alapjogokért Központ	1000	49	44	3	4	—N/a	5
4-14 Jan 2022	IDEA	2000	48	44	4	4	—N/a	4
2–5 Jan 2022	Nézőpont	1000	50	43	3	3	1	7
21-23 Dec 2021	Real-PR 93	1000	54	45	—N/a	—N/a	1	9
13–15 Dec 2021	Nézőpont	1000	55	43	—N/a	—N/a	2	12
9–14 Dec 2021	Republikon	1000	43	48	3	4	2	5
29 Nov–13 Dec 2021	IDEA	2000	47	46	3	4	0	1
4-13 Dec 2021	Závecz Research	1000	47	47	2	3	1	Tie
6–11 Dec 2021	Iránytű	2000	52.2	36.3	4.5	5.6	1.4	15.9
4–7 Dec 2021	Medián	1000	44	45	6	5	0	1
28–30 Nov 2021	Társadalomkutató	1000	51.2	45.3	—N/a	—N/a	3.5	5.9
25–30 Nov 2021	Publicus	1003	46	53	0	1	0	7
15–24 Nov 2021	Závecz Research	1000	48	49	2	3	2	1
17–23 Nov 2021	Republikon	1000	41	48	4	3	4	7
4–12 Nov 2021	e-benchmark	1000	52.3	46.5	—N/a	—N/a	1.2	5.8
2–12 Nov 2021	Závecz Research	1000	41.5	46	4.4	4.4	3.3	4.5
9–11 Nov 2021	Real-PR 93	1000	55	44	—N/a	—N/a	1	11
26 Oct–5 Nov 2021	IDEA	2000	48	45	3	3	1	3
2–3 Nov 2021	Nézőpont	1000	56	42	—N/a	—N/a	2	14
25–29 Oct 2021	Republikon	1000	42	51	2	3	4	9
25–27 Oct 2021	Nézőpont	1000	56	42	—N/a	—N/a	2	14
19–21 Oct 2021	Real-PR 93	1000	55	44	—N/a	—N/a	1	11
18–20 Oct 2021	Nézőpont	1000	56	43	—N/a	—N/a	2	13
11–19 Oct 2021	Závecz Research	1000	45.5	50.6	—N/a	—N/a	3.9	5.1
7–16 Oct 2021	e-benchmark	1000	50	48.9	—N/a	—N/a	1.2	1.1
Oct 2021	Századvég	1000	46.3	37.1	5.1	3	4.1	9.2
11–13 Oct 2021	Nézőpont	1000	56	42	—N/a	—N/a	1	14
30 Sep–9 Oct 2021	IDEA	2000	47	47	3	3	—N/a	Tie
4–6 Oct 2021	Medián	1000	44	47	5	4	—N/a	3
4–6 Oct 2021	Társadalomkutató	1000	52.9	43.5	—N/a	—N/a	3.5	9.4
4–6 Oct 2021	Nézőpont	1000	54	43	—N/a	—N/a	2	11
2–4 Oct 2021	Publicus	1000	44	52	2	1	1	8
1–4 Oct 2021	Republikon	1000	44	52	2	1	1	8
27–29 Sep 2021	Nézőpont	1000	54	44	—N/a	—N/a	2	10
20–21 Sep 2021	Nézőpont	1000	53	45	—N/a	—N/a	2	8
13–20 Sep 2021	Závecz Research	1000	49	49	—N/a	—N/a	—N/a	Tie
10–18 Sep 2021	e-benchmark	1000	51.8	48.2	—N/a	—N/a	—N/a	3.6
31 Aug–7 Sep 2021	IDEA	2000	49	45	3	3	0	4
23–28 Aug 2021	Republikon	1000	45	52	1	1	0	7
Aug 2021	Závecz Research	1000	50	45	2	2	1	5
20–25 Aug 2021	Nézőpont	1000	52	46	—N/a	—N/a	2	6
16–18 Aug 2021	Társadalomkutató	1000	49.2	48.2	—N/a	—N/a	2.2	1.0
22 Jul–1 Aug 2021	IDEA	2000	48	44	4	3	0	4
30 Jun–4 July 2021	IDEA	2000	47	45	3	4	1	2
8–16 Jun 2021	Závecz Research	1000	47	50	—N/a	—N/a	3	3
7–9 Jun 2021	Medián	1000	52	43	2	3	0	9
3–8 Jun 2021	Nézőpont	1000	50	42	4	4	0	8
27 May–8 Jun 2021	IDEA	2000	46	49	2	2	1	3
18-21 May 2021	Publicus	1011	44	54	1	1	1	10
8–17 May 2021	Závecz Research	1000	48	50	—N/a	—N/a	2	2
6–11 May 2021	Civitas	1003	53	45	1	1	2	8
27 Apr–4 May 2021	IDEA	2000	46	48	2	4	0	2
27–28 Apr 2021	Nézőpont	1000	51	43	2	3	1	8
24–28 Apr 2021	Publicus	1012	48	51	1	1	0	3
19–23 Apr 2021	Republikon	1000	46	52	1	1	0	6
Apr 2021	Závecz Research	1000	48	49	1	1	1	1
26–31 Mar 2021	IDEA	2000	44	48	3	4	1	4
18–25 Mar 2021	Republikon	1000	45	53	1	1	0	8
8–9 Mar 2021	Nézőpont	1000	53	44	1	1	0	9
5–11 Mar 2021	Civitas	1007	54	40	2	3	1	14
2–11 Mar 2021	Závecz Research	1000	46	50	1	3	0	4
22–25 Feb 2021	IDEA	2000	45	48	3	3	0	3
20–25 Feb 2021	Publicus	1001	45	54	—N/a	—N/a	0	9
15–22 Feb 2021	Republikon	1000	46	51	2	1	0	5
5–13 Feb 2021	Závecz Research	1000	47	50	—N/a	—N/a	3	3
22–26 Jan 2021	IDEA	2000	44	47	4	3	1	3
18–20 Jan 2021	Nézőpont	1000	52	45	1	1	0	7
14–21 Jan 2021	Republikon	1000	46	50	2	2	0	4
14–16 Dec 2020	Nézőpont	1000	51	43	3	2	0	8
11–15 Dec 2020	IDEA	2000	47	47	2	3	1	Tie
8–15 Dec 2020	Republikon	1000	46	50	2	2	0	4
1–8 Dec 2020	Závecz Research	1000	48	52	—N/a	—N/a	0	4
Dec 2020	Századvég	1000	56	44	—N/a	—N/a	0	12
Dec 2020	Medián	600	48.7	51.3	—N/a	—N/a	—N/a	2.6
18–21 Nov 2020	Publicus	1005	48	50	—N/a	—N/a	2	2
Nov 2020	Závecz Research	600	49	50	—N/a	—N/a	1	1

=== Individual parties ===
Fieldwork date	Polling firm	Sample size	Fidesz-KDNP	Jobbik	MSZP	P	LMP	DK	MM	MKKP	MH	Other	Lead
2–11 Mar 2022	IDEA	2000	50	12	4	2	1	17	7	3	3	1	33
26 Feb–5 Mar 2022	e-benchmark	1000	58	4	3	—N/a	1	14	5	3	4	11	44
2–10 Feb 2022	Závecz Research	1000	50	11	6	3	2	17	5	2	4	0	33
31 Jan–9 Feb 2022	IDEA	2000	49	11	4	2	1	17	8	3	4	1	32
20–25 Jan 2022	Republikon	1000	46	11	7	3	2	16	7	3	3	2	30
4–14 Jan 2022	IDEA	2000	48	11	4	2	1	17	9	3	4	1	31
9–14 Dec 2021	Republikon	1000	43	10	7	3	3	16	9	3	4	2	27
29 Nov–13 Dec 2021	IDEA	2000	47	11	3	2	1	18	10	3	4	1	29
6–11 Dec 2021	Iránytű	2000	49.0	13.5	2.5	1.0	2.5	12	8.5	5.0	6.0	0.0	35.5
25–30 Nov 2021	Publicus	1,004	46	9	10		1	13	6	0	1	14	32
15–24 Nov 2021	Závecz Research	1000	47	10	7	3	2	19	5	2	3	2	28
17–23 Nov 2021	Republikon	1000	41	10	7	4	3	15	9	4	3	4	26
4–12 Nov 2021	e-benchmark	1000	54.9	4.9	4.9	—N/a	1.2	15.9	3.7	4.9	1.3	8.5	29.0
2–12 Nov 2021	Závecz Research	1000	43.5	7.0	4.5	2.5	3.5	21	7.0	4.5	4.5	3.5	22.5
25–29 Oct 2021	Republikon	1000	42	11	7	2	3	16	10	3	2	2	26
11-19 Oct 2021	Závecz Research	1000	47	14	7	3	2	19	4	1	1	0	28
7–16 Oct 2021	e-benchmark	1000	58.7	4.0	1.3	—N/a	1.3	24.0	5.3	2.7	4.0	0.0	34.7
1–4 Oct 2021	Republikon	1000	44	13	8	2	2	18	9	2	1	0	26
10–18 Sep 2021	e-benchmark	1000	61.6	6.8	2.7	—N/a	1.4	17.8	5.5	2.7	1.4	0	43.8
31 Aug–7 Sep 2021	IDEA	2000	48	13	5	2	2	16	7	3	3	1	32
23–28 Aug 2021	Republikon	1000	45	15	7	2	3	17	8	1	1	1	28
Aug 2021	Závecz Research	1000	50	13	6	2	2	17	5	2	2	1	33
22 Jul–1 Aug 2021	IDEA	2000	47	13	5	2	2	16	9	4	3	0	31
30 Jun–4 Jul 2021	IDEA	2000	47	15	4	2	2	15	8	3	3	1	32
27 May–8 Jun 2021	IDEA	2000	46	15	5	2	2	16	9	2	2	1	30
18–21 May 2021	Publicus	600	44	11	10		2	12	8	1	1	1	32
8–17 May 2021	Závecz Research	1000	46	16	7	1	3	18	7	1	1	0	28
6–11 May 2021	Civitas	1003	54	14	2	1	2	13	8	2	1	0	40
27 Apr–4 May 2021	IDEA	2000	46	14	5	2	1	16	9	2	2	0	30
24–28 Apr 2021	Publicus	1012	48	10	9	1	1	11	8	1	1	0	37
19–23 Apr 2021	Republikon	1000	46	14	9	2	2	13	12	1	1	0	32
Apr 2021	Závecz Research	1000	47	15	7	1	2	17	8	1	1	1	30
26–31 Mar 2021	IDEA	2000	44	14	5	2	1	17	10	3	3	1	27
5–11 Mar 2021	Civitas	1007	47	14	3	2	3	9	9	2	3	1	33
2–11 Mar 2021	Závecz Research	1000	46	14	7	2	2	16	9	1	3	0	30
20–25 Feb 2021	Publicus	1001	45	10	9	1	1	12	9	1	1	0	33
22–25 Feb 2021	IDEA	2000	44	11	6	3	2	17	10	2	2	0	27
15–22 Feb 2021	Republikon	1000	46	11	8	2	2	15	13	3	1	0	31
5–13 Feb 2021	Závecz Research	1000	47	12	8	1	3	18	9	1	1	0	29
14–21 Jan 2021	Republikon	1000	46	8	8	3	2	16	13	2	2	0	30
Dec 2020	Medián	600	49	10	4		2	11	13	5	3	0	33
11–15 Dec 2020	IDEA	2000	47	9	6	2	2	17	11	2	3	1	30
8–15 Dec 2020	Republikon	1000	46	8	8	3	2	15	14	2	2	0	31
1–8 Dec 2020	Závecz Research	1000	45	10	7	2	2	19	10	3	2	0	26
30 Nov–4 Dec 2020	IDEA	2000	47	9	7	2	3	17	10	2	2	2	30
16–23 Nov 2020	Republikon	1000	48	7	8	2	2	15	13	3	2	0	33
18–21 Nov 2020	Publicus	1000	48	8	10	2	1	13	11	1	1	0	35
3–17 Nov 2020	Závecz Research	1000	47	10	7	2	2	17	11	2	2	0	30
31 Oct–5 Nov 2020	IDEA	2000	48	8	6	2	3	17	10	2	2	2	31
19–26 Oct 2020	Republikon	1000	50	7	7	2	2	15	12	3	2	0	35
15–20 Oct 2020	Iránytű	1000	51	12	6	1	2	12	10	3	2	1	39
5–15 Oct 2020	Závecz Research	1000	49	10	6	2	2	17	10	2	2	0	32
30 Sep–4 Oct 2020	IDEA	2000	50	8	6	2	2	17	10	2	2	0	33
22–25 Sep 2020	Publicus	1005	49	9	9	1	1	13	11	2	1	2	36
7–18 Sep 2020	Závecz Research	1000	50	9	6	2	2	18	10	1	2	0	32
27 Aug–31 Aug 2020	IDEA	2000	52	7	6	2	2	16	10	2	2	1	36
27 Aug–31 Aug 2020	Publicus	1009	48	8	10	2	2	14	10	2	2	2	36
14 Aug–24 Aug 2020	Republikon	1000	54	8	6	1	3	14	9	4	1	0	40
5 Aug–19 Aug 2020	Závecz Research	1000	51	8	6	2	2	15	10	2	3	0	36
30 Jul–3 Aug 2020	IDEA	2000	52	6	6	2	2	16	10	3	1	2	36
13–15 Jul 2020	Závecz Research	1000	52	7	5	1	3	15	11	3	3	0	37
30 Jun–2 Jul 2020	Nézőpont	1000	51	9	4		3	11	16	4	1	1	35
27–30 Jun 2020	IDEA	2000	50	6	6	2	2	15	13	2	2	2	35
5–10 Jun 2020	Publicus	1,007	51	7	11		2	14	11	2	2	1	37
3–5 Jun 2020	Nézőpont	1000	52	9	4		2	12	14	5	1	1	38
28 May–5 Jun 2020	Medián	1000	50	7	7	2	2	12	12	4	2	1	38
27–31 May 2020	IDEA	2000	49	7	6	2	2	17	11	1	3	1	32
18–22 May 2020	Publicus	998	50	8	12		1	16	11	2	1	0	34
7–8 May 2020	Nézőpont	1000	54	9	3		2	11	13	6	1	2	43
20–26 Apr 2020	IDEA	2000	50	7	7	2	2	16	12	1	2	1	34
14–19 Apr 2020	Závecz Research	1500	53	9	11		3	15	8	0	1	1	38
16–18 Apr 2020	Nézőpont	1000	55	9	3		1	12	11	5	1	0	43
14–18 Apr 2020	Publicus	1500	51	9	10		2	13	9	2	1	2	38
17–21 Mar 2020	Publicus	1003	52	10	8		2	13	7	1	2	3	39
17–20 Mar 2020	IDEA	2000	49	9	7	2	2	16	9	2	3	1	33
12–14 Mar 2020	Nézőpont	1000	51	10	4	1	3	10	13	5	2	1	38
3–13 Mar 2020	Závecz Research	1000	50	9	7	2	2	16	9	2	2	1	34
5–10 Mar 2020	Publicus	1009	48	10	12		2	14	12	1	1	0	34
Feb 2020	Medián	1200	55	11	6	1	4	13	7	1	1	1	42
10–20 Feb 2020	Závecz Research	1000	51	10	7	2	2	14	9	2	2	1	37
31 Jan–12 Feb 2020	IDEA	2000	47	9	6	2	3	16	10	3	3	1	31
13–20 Jan 2020	Závecz Research	1000	52	9	7	1	3	14	10	1	2	1	38
10–16 Jan 2020	Nézőpont	1000	50	10	5		4	10	13	4	3	0	37
14–20 Dec 2019	Publicus	1002	47	10	11	0	2	12	12	3	1	2	35
8–15 Dec 2019	Závecz Research	1000	50	9	7	2	1	15	10	2	3	1	35
28 Nov–5 Dec 2019	Medián	1200	54	10	7		3	11	10	2	3	0	43
29 Nov–3 Dec 2019	IDEA	2000	49	7	5	2	2	17	12	3	2	1	32
1–30 Nov 2019	Nézőpont	5000	52	9	7		3	10	11	4	3	1	41
8–16 Nov 2019	Závecz Research	1000	49	9	8	1	2	15	11	2	3	0	34
29–31 Oct 2019	IDEA	2000	51	9	7	2	2	14	9	2	3	1	37
14–27 Oct 2019	Nézőpont	2300	52	9	6		3	11	13	3	2	1	39
18–23 Oct 2019	Medián	1200	59	6	9	0	3	14	6	1	1	1	45
17–22 Oct 2019	Publicus	1001	50	10	10		2	12	12	2	2	0	38
20–26 Sep 2019	Medián	1200	62	7	10		1	13	5	1	1	0	49
23–25 Sep 2019	Századvég	1000	54	8	7		3	11	10	0	3	4	43
20–24 Sep 2019	IDEA	2000	50	8	7	2	2	16	9	3	2	1	34
7–15 Sep 2019	Závecz Research	1000	54	7	8	1	2	15	8	1	3	1	39
1–26 Aug 2019	Nézőpont	5000	53	8	6		3	11	11	4	3	1	42
12–17 Aug 2019	Publicus	1001	52	10	10		2	12	11	2	1	1	40
4–14 Aug 2019	Závecz Research	1000	53	9	7	1	2	14	7	2	3	2	39
2–28 Jul 2019	Nézőpont	5000	52	9	7		3	11	11	4	3	0	40
23–26 Jul 2019	IDEA	2000	48	9	6	1	3	18	8	4	2	1	30
16–23 Jul 2019	Publicus	1007	51	10	10		2	11	10	2	2	1	41
4–14 Jul 2019	Závecz Research	1000	51	8	7	1	2	17	7	3	3	1	34
28 Jun–2 Jul 2019	Medián	1000	57	8	8		2	17	6	1	1	0	40
21–27 Jun 2019	Publicus	1001	52	10	10		3	12	11	1	1	0	40
31 May–26 Jun 2019	Nézőpont	5000	53	8	6		3	12	10	5	2	1	41
4–14 Jun 2019	Závecz Research	1000	53	7	7	1	2	17	9	2	3	0	36
5–9 Jun 2019	IDEA	2000	49	9	8	2	2	15	9	3	2	3	34
26 May 2019	EP Election	–	52.6	6.3	6.6		2.2	16.1	9.9	2.6	3.3	0.4	36.5
16–22 May 2019	Publicus	999	52	15	14		4	7	4	2	1	1	36
2–19 May 2019	Nézőpont	4000	54	10	10		5	10	6	3	2	0	44
15–18 May 2019	Medián	1000	55	12	11		4	10	5	1	2	1	43
10–18 May 2019	Századvég	1000	51	9	7		3	11	6	—N/a	3	3	40
4–14 May 2019	Závecz Research	1000	53	12	12		5	11	4	2	2	0	41
6–11 May 2019	Iránytű	647	50	14	7		5	8	6	4	2	2	36
2–6 May 2019	IDEA	2000	50	13	10	2	5	9	4	4	2	1	37
1–26 Apr 2019	Nézőpont	1000	57	11	10		5	8	4	3	2	0	46
15–25 Apr 2019	Závecz Research	1000	57	6	12	1	4	11	5	2	1	0	44
17–23 Apr 2019	Publicus	1010	52	15	16		4	7	6	0	0	0	36
10–21 Apr 2019	Századvég	1000	54	14	10		4	9	4	—N/a	2	3	40
5–15 Apr 2019	Závecz Research	1000	53	12	12	1	4	9	4	2	2	1	40
29 Mar–3 Apr 2019	Medián	1000	56	11	11	1	6	10	3	1	0	1	44
29 Mar–1 Apr 2019	IDEA	2000	48	14	10	2	4	9	6	3	2	2	34
1–28 Mar 2019	Nézőpont	5000	56	12	11		5	6	4	4	2	0	44
13–20 Mar 2019	Publicus	1001	50	16	17		2	4	4	4	1	2	33
8–19 Mar 2019	Závecz Research	1000	50	14	13	1	4	9	5	1	2	2	36
28 Feb–4 Mar 2019	IDEA	2000	47	17	10	2	3	9	4	4	2	2	30
31 Jan–22 Feb 2019	Nézőpont	5000	54	13	11		5	6	4	4	3	0	41
13–20 Feb 2019	Publicus	999	50	17	15		3	5	4	2	0	4	33
3–10 Feb 2019	Závecz Research	1000	49	14	12	2	4	9	4	2	2	2	35
26–28 Jan 2019	IDEA	2000	47	16	10	2	3	9	6	4	1	2	31
18–27 Jan 2019	Medián	1200	56	13	12	1	5	9	3	0	1	0	43
1–27 Jan 2019	Nézőpont	5000	54	13	10		5	7	4	3	3	1	41
9–16 Jan 2019	Publicus	1009	47	17	16		4	6	4	3	1	2	30
7–13 Jan 2019	Századvég	1000	53	13	12		5	8	—N/a	—N/a	—N/a	9	40
4–11 Jan 2019	Závecz Research	1000	48	17	12	2	4	8	5	3	1	1	31
17–20 Dec 2018	IDEA	2000	50	11	10	3	4	9	5	4	1	2	37
13–19 Dec 2018	Publicus	1000	48	15	16		4	6	4	3	1	3	32
26 Nov–15 Dec 2018	Nézőpont	2000	54	14	11		4	7	4	3	3	0	40
4–11 Dec 2018	Závecz Research	1000	51	15	13	2	3	8	4	3	2	1	36
30 Nov–5 Dec 2018	Medián	1200	59	12	10		2	10	3	1	2	1	47
30 Nov–3 Dec 2018	IDEA	2000	51	12	10	2	3	9	5	4	2	2	39
10–27 Nov 2018	Nézőpont	2000	53	15	10		4	7	4	4	2	1	38
13–22 Nov 2018	Závecz Research	1000	55	12	11	1	3	8	5	3	1	0	43
14–21 Nov 2018	Publicus	1000	54	13	14		4	5	2	3	2	3	40
10–29 Oct 2018	Nézőpont	2000	51	17	10		4	8	4	4	1	1	34
18–22 Oct 2018	IDEA	2000	55	18	8	1	3	7	2	4	1	1	37
12–21 Oct 2018	Závecz Research	1000	57	12	11	2	3	7	4	2	1	0	45
12–17 Oct 2018	Medián	1200	63	11	8	1	2	9	3	1	1	1	52
11–17 Oct 2018	Publicus	1007	52	14	15		4	5	2	3	1	3	37
Sep 2018	Medián	1200	60	11	9		4	10	2	1	2	1	49
12–19 Sep 2018	Publicus	1001	53	14	15		5	5	2	3	0	3	38
11–19 Sep 2018	Závecz Research	1000	57	14	11	1	4	7	3	2	2	0	43
29 Aug–18 Sep 2018	Nézőpont	2000	52	18	8		5	8	3	3	1	2	34
3–10 Sep 2018	Századvég	1000	53	14	13		5	7	—N/a	—N/a	—N/a	8	39
10–18 Aug 2018	Závecz Research	1000	56	14	10		5	7	2	3	0	3	42
8–16 Aug 2018	Publicus	998	52	16	15		4	4	2	3	0	4	36
19 Jul–14 Aug 2018	Nézőpont	2000	54	17	9		5	7	4	2	1	1	37
10–18 Jul 2018	Závecz Research	1000	55	13	10	3	5	7	1	3	0	3	42
1–17 Jul 2018	Nézőpont	2000	55	17	9		5	6	4	2	1	1	38
10–16 Jul 2018	Publicus	1010	49	17	16		5	4	2	3	0	4	32
2–6 Jul 2018	Századvég	1000	53	13	14		6	6	—N/a	—N/a	—N/a	8	39
3–22 Jun 2018	Nézőpont	2000	55	18	9		6	5	4	2	—N/a	1	37
7–13 Jun 2018	Publicus	996	48	16	16		5	4	3	3	—N/a	5	32
4–11 Jun 2018	Závecz Research	1000	55	17	9	2	5	6	2	3	—N/a	1	38
28 May–1 Jun 2018	Medián	1200	59	16	11		3	7	3	0	—N/a	1	43
2–22 May 2018	Nézőpont	2000	54	19	9		6	5	4	2	—N/a	1	35
6–13 May 2018	Závecz Research	1000	50	21	11		6	6	3	1	—N/a	2	29
4–9 May 2018	Publicus	1008	48	18	15		5	4	3	3	—N/a	5	30
13–30 Apr 2018	Nézőpont	2000	52	19	10		6	6	4	2	—N/a	1	33
18–23 Apr 2018	Publicus	995	49	18	15		5	4	3	3	—N/a	4	31
8 Apr 2018	National Election	–	49.3	19.1	11.9		7.1	5.4	3.1	1.7	(Did not exist)	2.6	30.2

=== No party preferences ===
Fieldwork date	Polling firm	No party
4–14 Sep 2019	Závecz Research	31%
4–14 Aug 2019	Závecz Research	30%
4–14 Jul 2019	Závecz Research	34%
4–14 Jun 2019	Závecz Research	30%
4-14 May 2019	Závecz Research	31%
5–15 Apr 2019	Závecz Research	34%
8–19 Mar 2019	Závecz Research	36%
3–10 Feb 2019	Závecz Research	33%
4–11 Jan 2019	Závecz Research	32%
4–11 Dec 2018	Závecz Research	32%
13–22 Nov 2018	Závecz Research	33%
12–21 Oct 2018	Závecz Research	34%
11–19 Sep 2018	Závecz Research	34%
10–18 Aug 2018	Závecz Research	35%
10–18 Jul 2018	Závecz Research	37%
4–11 Jun 2018	Závecz Research	36%
6–13 May 2018	Závecz Research	30%

=== Uncertainty polling ===
Fieldwork date	Polling firm	Don't know
12–17 Aug 2019	Publicus	39%
16–23 Jul 2019	Publicus	39%
21–27 Jun 2019	Publicus	37%
16–22 May 2019	Publicus	39%
13–20 Mar 2019	Publicus	44%
13–20 Feb 2019	Publicus	48%
9–16 Jan 2019	Publicus	48%
13–19 Dec 2018	Publicus	50%
14–21 Nov 2018	Publicus	49%
11–17 Oct 2018	Publicus	47%
12–19 Sep 2018	Publicus	45%
8–16 Aug 2018	Publicus	49%
10–16 Jul 2018	Publicus	45%
7–13 Jun 2018	Publicus	42%
4–9 May 2018	Publicus	40%
18–23 Apr 2018	Publicus	37%

== Seat projections ==
Date	Polling firm	Fidesz–KDNP	EM	MNOÖ	MH	Majority
3 Apr 2022	National Election	135	57	1	6	36
1 Apr 2022	Medián	121	77	1	0	22
1 Apr 2022	taktikaiszavazas.hu	117	81	1	0	18
30 Mar 2022	Medián	128	71 (Note: DK: 20 seats; Jobbik: 14 seats; Momentum: 13 seats; MSZP: 12 seats; Párbeszéd: 7 seats; LMP: 5 seats.)	0	0	28
28 Mar 2022	Nézőpont	119	79	1	0	20
28 Mar 2022	taktikaiszavazas.hu	114	84	1	0	15
23 Mar 2022	taktikaiszavazas.hu	121	77	1	0	22
13 Mar 2022	taktikaiszavazas.hu	117	81	1	0	18
27 Feb 2022	taktikaiszavazas.hu	115	83	1	0	16
15 Feb 2022	Vox Populi	124	74	1	0	25
15 Feb 2022	taktikaiszavazas.hu	114	84	1	0	15
31 Jan 2022	taktikaiszavazas.hu	112	86	1	0	13
17 Jan 2022	taktikaiszavazas.hu	108	90	1	0	9
3 Jan 2022	taktikaiszavazas.hu	107	91	1	0	8
20 Dec 2021	taktikaiszavazas.hu	105	93	1	0	6
8 Dec 2021	taktikaiszavazas.hu	102	96	1	0	3
29 Nov 2021	taktikaiszavazas.hu	97	101	1	0	2
15 Nov 2021	taktikaiszavazas.hu	98	100	1	0	1
1 Nov 2021	taktikaiszavazas.hu	102	96	1	0	3
18 Oct 2021	taktikaiszavazas.hu	102	96	1	0	3
1 Oct 2021	taktikaiszavazas.hu	105	93	1	0	6
1 Sep 2021	taktikaiszavazas.hu	108	90	1	0	9
1 Aug 2021	taktikaiszavazas.hu	109	89	1	0	10
1 Jul 2021	taktikaiszavazas.hu	108	90	1	0	9
1 Jun 2021	taktikaiszavazas.hu	106	92	1	0	7
1 May 2021	taktikaiszavazas.hu	101	98	1	0	2
1 Apr 2021	taktikaiszavazas.hu	97	102	1	0	3
1 Mar 2021	taktikaiszavazas.hu	95	103	1	0	4

== Regional polling results ==
=== Budapest ===
Date(s) conducted	Polling firm	Sample size	Fidesz-KDNP	Jobbik	MSZP	Dialogue	LMP	DK	MM	MKKP	MH	Other	Lead
3 Apr 2022	National Election	–	40.9	47.8						5.2	4.1	2.0	6.9
23–28 Mar 2022	Medián	1000	36.8	53.1						7.4	3.7	—N/a	16.3
9–11 Feb 2022	Real-PR 93	1000	39	53						6	2	1	14
2–10 Feb 2022	Závecz Research	1000	32	52						—N/a	—N/a	—N/a	20
11–19 Oct 2021	Závecz Research	1000	24	58						—N/a	—N/a	—N/a	34
17–24 Jun 2020	Republikon	1000	40	5	10		3	14	18	6	1	7	22
10–15 Dec 2019	Publicus	1000	40	4	12		4	18	16	3	1	2	22
26 May 2019	EP Election	–	41.2	3.2	9.0		3.0	19.8	17.4	3.8	2.3	0.3	21.4
8 Apr 2018	National Election	–	38.2	12.9	18.1		10.8	8.7	5.8	5.7 (Note: MH did not exist before the election.)			20.1

== Diaspora polling results ==
Country/area	Date(s) conducted	Polling firm	Sample size	Fidesz-KDNP	Jobbik	MSZP	Dialogue	LMP	DK	MM	MKKP	MH	Other	Lead
Diaspora	3 Apr 2022	National Election	–	93.9	4.1						0.6	1.1	0.3	89.8
Romania	21 Jan–17 Feb 2022	SoDiSo Research	1309	90.8	1.9						7.3			88.9
Diaspora	26 May 2019	EP Election	–	96.0	0.3	0.5		0.4	0.6	1.0	0.6	0.6	0.1	95.0
Diaspora	8 Apr 2018	National Election	–	96.2	0.9	0.6		0.9	0.3	0.5	0.6			95.3

== Preferred prime minister ==
=== Total ===
Fieldwork date	Polling firm	Sample size	Orbán	Jakab	Karácsony	Dobrev	Gyurcsány	Fekete-Győr	Márki-Zay	Other/Don't Know	Lead
24–26 Mar 2022	Medián	1096	54	—N/a	—N/a	—N/a	—N/a	—N/a	29	17	25
Mar 2022	Századvég	1000	62	—N/a	—N/a	—N/a	—N/a	—N/a	32	6	30
26 Feb–5 Mar 2022	e-benchmark	1000	62	—N/a	—N/a	—N/a	—N/a	—N/a	38	0	24
Nov 2021–Mar 2022	Alapjogokért Központ	1000	61	—N/a	—N/a	—N/a	—N/a	—N/a	26	13	35
Nov 2021–Mar 2022	Alapjogokért Központ	1000	59	—N/a	—N/a	—N/a	—N/a	—N/a	24	17	35
Nov 2021–Mar 2022	Alapjogokért Központ	1000	52	—N/a	—N/a	—N/a	—N/a	—N/a	28	20	24
Nov 2021–Mar 2022	Alapjogokért Központ	1000	57	—N/a	—N/a	—N/a	—N/a	—N/a	26	17	31
Nov 2021–Mar 2022	Alapjogokért Központ	1000	58	—N/a	—N/a	—N/a	—N/a	—N/a	24	18	34
Nov 2021–Mar 2022	Alapjogokért Központ	1000	55	—N/a	—N/a	—N/a	—N/a	—N/a	26	19	29
Nov 2021–Mar 2022	Alapjogokért Központ	1000	57	—N/a	—N/a	—N/a	—N/a	—N/a	25	18	32
Nov 2021–Mar 2022	Alapjogokért Központ	1000	53	—N/a	—N/a	—N/a	—N/a	—N/a	29	18	24
Nov 2021–Mar 2022	Alapjogokért Központ	1000	57	—N/a	—N/a	—N/a	—N/a	—N/a	26	17	31
Nov 2021–Mar 2022	Alapjogokért Központ	1000	56	—N/a	—N/a	—N/a	—N/a	—N/a	24	20	32
Nov 2021–Mar 2022	Alapjogokért Központ	1000	55	—N/a	—N/a	—N/a	—N/a	—N/a	24	21	31
Nov 2021–Mar 2022	Alapjogokért Központ	1000	59	—N/a	—N/a	—N/a	—N/a	—N/a	22	19	37
Nov 2021–Mar 2022	Alapjogokért Központ	1000	61	—N/a	—N/a	—N/a	—N/a	—N/a	24	15	37
Nov 2021–Mar 2022	Alapjogokért Központ	1000	53	—N/a	—N/a	—N/a	—N/a	—N/a	27	20	26
Nov 2021–Mar 2022	Alapjogokért Központ	1000	52	—N/a	—N/a	—N/a	—N/a	—N/a	26	12	26
Nov 2021–Mar 2022	Alapjogokért Központ	1000	56	—N/a	—N/a	—N/a	—N/a	—N/a	28	16	28
4–12 Nov 2021	e-benchmark	1000	46	—N/a	—N/a	—N/a	—N/a	—N/a	37	17	9
2–4 Nov 2021	Real-Pr 93	1000	52	—N/a	—N/a	—N/a	—N/a	—N/a	37	11	15
18–20 Oct 2021	Nézőpont	1000	54	—N/a	—N/a	—N/a	—N/a	—N/a	23	23	31
Oct 2021	Századvég	1000	51	—N/a	—N/a	—N/a	—N/a	—N/a	41	8	10
10–16 Oct 2021	e-benchmark	1000	44	—N/a	—N/a	27	—N/a	—N/a	12	16	17
10–18 Sep 2021	e-benchmark	1000	43	4	7	15	0	2	3	25	28
Aug 2021	Századvég	1000	54	—N/a	34	—N/a	—N/a	—N/a	—N/a	12	20
18–28 Aug 2021	e-benchmark	1000	44	4	8	15	1	3	—N/a	26	29
17 May–4 Aug 2021	Nézőpont	1000	55	—N/a	15	—N/a	—N/a	—N/a	—N/a	30	40
17 May–4 Aug 2021	Nézőpont	1000	55	—N/a	16	—N/a	—N/a	—N/a	—N/a	29	39
17 May–4 Aug 2021	Nézőpont	1000	50	—N/a	20	—N/a	—N/a	—N/a	—N/a	30	30
17 May–4 Aug 2021	Nézőpont	1000	49	—N/a	19	—N/a	—N/a	—N/a	—N/a	32	30
17 May–4 Aug 2021	Nézőpont	1000	49	—N/a	21	—N/a	—N/a	—N/a	—N/a	30	28
17 May–4 Aug 2021	Nézőpont	1000	50	—N/a	16	—N/a	—N/a	—N/a	—N/a	34	34
May 2021	Századvég	1000	50	—N/a	42	—N/a	—N/a	—N/a	—N/a	8	8
30–31 Mar 2021	Nézőpont	1000	44	10	7	—N/a	—N/a	—N/a	—N/a	39	34

=== Approval rating of Péter Márki-Zay as potential prime minister ===
Fieldwork date	Polling firm	Sample size	Would You rather have Péter Márki-Zay or someone else become the Prime Minister of Hungary?			
Fieldwork date	Polling firm	Sample size	check	X mark	Question	Net
Fieldwork date	Polling firm	Sample size	Márki-Zay	someone else	Question	Net
8–10 Nov 2021	Nézőpont	1000	24	62	14	−38

== See also ==
- Opinion polling for the 2018 Hungarian parliamentary election
- Opinion polling for the 2026 Hungarian parliamentary election
