= Marc Danzon =

French WHO Regional Director for Europe

Marc Danzon was the European regional director for the World Health Organization from 2000 until 2010. Danzon, who is French, has a background working as a child psychiatrist. In February 2010, Zsuzsanna Jakab succeeded him.
