= 15th district of Budapest =

15th District of Budapest Budapest XV. kerülete Rákospalota-Pestújhely-Újpalota
- District of Budapest
- District XV
- Flag Coat of arms

- Location of District XV in Budapest (shown in grey)
- Coordinates: 47°33′44″N 19°07′56″E
- Country: Hungary
- Region: Central Hungary
- City: Budapest
- Established: 1 January 1950
- Quarters: List: Pestújhely; Rákospalota; Újpalota

Government
  - Mayor: Angéla Németh (DK)

Area
  - Total: 26.94 km^{2} (10.40 sq mi)
  - Rank: 11th

Population (2016)
  - Total: 80,573
  - Rank: 9th
  - Density: 2,991/km^{2} (7,746/sq mi)
- Demonym: tizenötödik kerületi ("15th districter")
- Time zone: UTC+1 (CET)
  - Summer (DST): UTC+2 (CEST)
- Postal code: 1151 ... 1158
- Website: www.bpxv.hu

Rákospalota, Újpalota, Pestújhely, 15th District the 15th district of Budapest, Hungary.

== List of mayors ==
Member	Party	Date
Tamás Czibik	SZDSZ	1990–1996 (Note: Deprived from office by the Supreme Court of Hungary)
László Hajdu	MSZP	1996–2010
Tamás László	Fidesz	2010–2014
László Hajdu	DK	2014–2018 (Note: Resigned)
Angéla Németh	DK	2018–

== Sport ==
The association football club, Rákospalotai EAC, is based in Rákospalota.

== Twin towns – sister cities ==
15th district of Budapest is twinned with:

- Dabas, Hungary
- Donji Kraljevec, Croatia
- Liesing (Vienna), Austria
- Linyi, China
- Marzahn-Hellersdorf (Berlin), Germany
- Nad jazerom (Košice), Slovakia
- Obervellach, Austria
- Sanming, China
- Topliţa, Romania
