= Zsuzsanna Jakab =

Hungarian public health expert

Deputy Director-General of the World Health Organization
- In office 7 March 2019 – 1 April 2024
- Director-General: Tedros Adhanom Ghebreyesus
- Succeeded by: Michael Ryan

World Health Organization Regional Director of Europe
- In office 2010–2019
- Preceded by: Marc Danzon
- Succeeded by: Hans Henri P. Kluge

Director of the European Centre for Disease Prevention and Control
- In office 2005–2010
- Succeeded by: Marc Sprenger

Personal details
- Born: Zsuzsanna Szántó; 17 May 1951 (age 75)

Zsuzsanna Jakab (Jakab Ferencné; born 17 May 1951) is a Hungarian public health expert who has served as Deputy Director General of the World Health Organization from 7 March 2019 to 21 April 2024. A native of Hungary, she has held a number of high-profile national and international public health policy positions in the last three decades.

Before being appointed Deputy Director, Jakab was Director of the World Health Organization's Regional Office for Europe in Copenhagen, Denmark. Before she was elected Regional Director, Jakab served as the founding Director of the European Union's European Centre for Disease Prevention and Control (ECDC) in Stockholm, Sweden between 2005 and 2010.

== Education ==
Jakab holds a master's degree from the Faculty of Humanities of the Eötvös Loránd University, Budapest; a postgraduate degree from the University of Political Sciences, Budapest; a diploma in public health from the Nordic College for Public Health in Gothenburg, Sweden; and a postgraduate diploma from the National Institute of Public Administration and Management, Hungary.

== Career ==
Jakab began her career in Hungary's Ministry of Health and Social Welfare in 1975, being responsible for external affairs, including relations with WHO.

Between 1991 and 2002, Jakab worked at the World Health Organization's Regional Office for Europe in a range of senior management roles, including an appointment as Director of Administration and Management Support. Before this, as Director of Country Health Development, she was in charge of external relations and strategic partnerships: coordinating collaboration with the 51 Member States in the WHO European Region and international partners. During her long tenure with the organization, she also served as Director of the Division of Information, Evidence and Communication and Coordinator of the EUROHEALTH programme.

Between 2002 and 2005, Jakab was State Secretary at the Hungarian Ministry of Health, Social and Family Affairs, where she managed the country's preparations for European Union accession in the area of public health. She played a key role in the negotiations leading up to the Fourth WHO Ministerial Conference on Environment and Health, held in Budapest in June 2004.

Jakab was the founding Director of the European Centre for Disease Prevention and Control in Stockholm from 2005 to 2010. Under her leadership, the agency's staff and budget continued to grow each year.

From 2010, Jakab served as Director of the World Health Organization's Regional Office for Europe in Copenhagen. She was the Hungarian government's candidate and succeeded Marc Danzon on 1 February 2010, becoming the first woman, the first central-eastern European and the first non-doctor to serve in this position. Jakab finished her term as Regional Director in 2019. In March 2019, she was appointed Deputy Director-General of the World Health Organization.

== Other activities ==
- European Health Forum Gastein (EFGH), Member of the Advisory Committee
- GAVI, Member of the Board
- Partnership for Maternal, Newborn & Child Health (PMNCH), Member of the Board
- World Health Summit (WHS), Member of the Council

== Controversy ==
In 2020, WHO employee Natalia Menabde lodged internal appeals regarding Jakab's modification of her terms of reference and removal of her managerial responsibilities after Jakab took charge as regional director of WHO's Europe office. In its judgement on the case, the Administrative Tribunal of the International Labour Organization (ILO) found that Jakab acted in "flagrant disregard of the complainant's rights."

== See also ==
- World Health Organization
- European Centre for Disease Prevention and Control

Non-profit organization positions
Preceded by Marc Danzon	Director of the World Health Organization's Regional Office for Europe; 2010–2019	Succeeded by Hans Henri P. Kluge
Preceded by	Director of the European Centre for Disease Prevention and Control; 2005–2010	Succeeded by Marc Sprenger
