= Tamás László =

Hungarian architect and politician

Mayor of District XV, Budapest
- In office 3 October 2010 – 12 October 2014
- Preceded by: László Hajdu
- Succeeded by: László Hajdu

Member of the National Assembly
- In office 16 May 2006 – 7 May 2018

Personal details
- Born: 29 October 1950 (age 75) Budapest, Hungary
- Party: Fidesz (since 2004)
- Children: 2
- Profession: architect, politician

Tamás László (born October 29, 1950) is a Hungarian architect and politician who served as Mayor of the 15th district of Budapest from 2010 to 2014. Since 2004, he has been a member of Fidesz.

== Biography ==
He joined Fidesz in 2004, becoming president of its local branch in the 15th district. László was a member of the National Assembly of Hungary for the 15th district since 2010. He was also a Member of Parliament from Fidesz National List from 2006 to 2010. He was a member of the Economic and Information Technology Committee from May 14, 2010, to March 26, 2012. He also worked in the Committee on Consumer Protection.

László was defeated by László Hajdu during the 2018 parliamentary election, thus lost his parliamentary seat. Thereafter, Tamás László unsuccessfully ran for the mayoral seat of the 15th district in the by-election held on 30 September 2018, but was defeated by Angéla Németh. László was replaced as president of the Fidesz 15th district branch in February 2019.

== Personal life ==
He is married and has two children.
