= László Hajdu =

Hungarian economist and politician

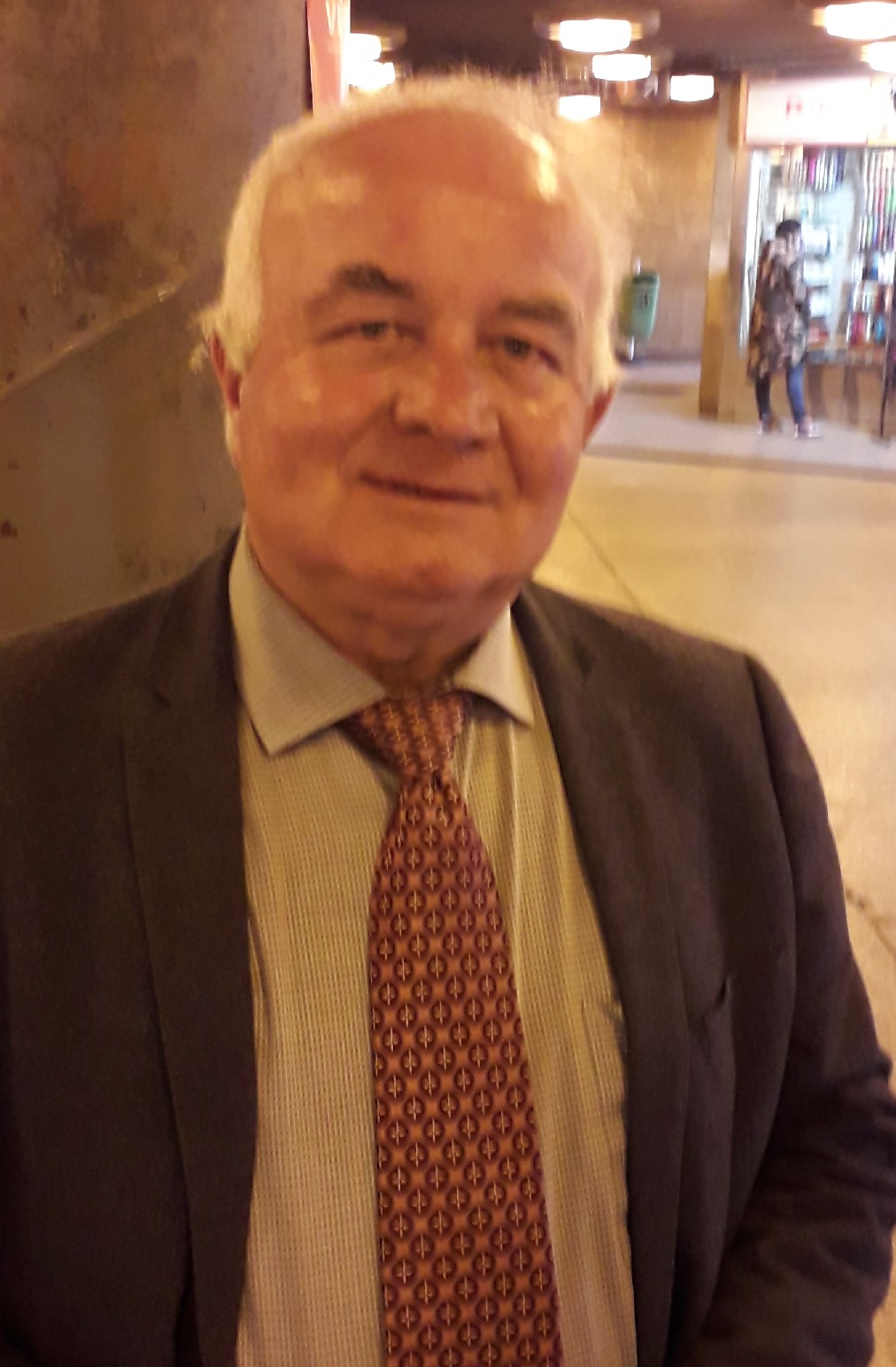

Mayor of District XV, Budapest
- In office 12 October 2014 – 7 June 2018
- Preceded by: Tamás László (Fidesz)
- Succeeded by: Angéla Németh (DK)
- In office 8 December 1996 – 3 October 2010
- Preceded by: Tamás Czibik (SZDSZ)
- Succeeded by: Tamás László (Fidesz)

Member of the National Assembly
- Incumbent
- Assumed office 8 May 2018
- In office 28 June 1994 – 13 May 2010

Personal details
- Born: 23 August 1947 (age 78) Vésztő, Hungary
- Party: MSZMP (1970–1989); MSZP (1989–2011); DK (since 2011)
- Children: László; Katalin; Mónika
- Profession: economist, politician

László Hajdu (born August 23, 1947) is a Hungarian economist and politician, who has served as Mayor of the 15th district of Budapest from 2014 to 2018, a position which he also held between 1996 and 2010. He was replaced by Tamás László.

Hajdu also represented District XV (Budapest Constituency XXIII) in the National Assembly of Hungary from 1994 to 2010, and again since 2018.

== Personal life ==
He is married to Krisztina Mária Katalin Onódi, a public servant, since 1970. The couple has three children - a son László (born in 1970) and two daughters, Katalin (born in 1975) and Mónika (born in 1979).
