= Opinion polling for the 2026 Hungarian parliamentary election =

In the run-up to the 2026 Hungarian parliamentary election which was held on 12 April 2026, various organizations carried out opinion polling to gauge voting intention in Hungary. The results of such polls are displayed in this article.

== Pollster bias ==
=== Pollsters ===
The following table displays the pollsters in alphabetical order which have alleged funding and/or links to political parties:

Pollster	Alleged bias or conflict of interest	Source(s)
21 Kutatóközpont	Its founder and director previously worked for Momentum, as advisor to opposition mayors László Botka or Gergely Karácsony, and the pollster is close to the opposition newspaper 24.hu.	
XXI. Század Intézet	Strong links to Fidesz, its director is Mária Schmidt, a former advisor of Viktor Orbán, and its board includes former MEP József Szájer.	
Alapjogokért Központ	Strong links to Fidesz, and received government funding.	
Forrás Társadalomkutató	Its founders were members of the campaign staff for EM in 2022.	
IDEA Institute	One of the key staff members is an advisor to DK.	
Iránytű Institute	Receives funding from Jobbik, and the party is reportedly the company's only client.	
Magyar Társadalomkutató	Strong links to Fidesz.	
McLaughlin & Associates	The company has been described as "Donald Trump's pollster" and is close to the government ally newspaper Index.hu.	
Medián	The company's owner was formerly an SZDSZ member, and is close to the opposition newspaper HVG.	
Nézőpont Institute	Strong links to Fidesz, and received government funding.	
Publicus Institute	Close relationship with MSZP, and the pollster is close to the leftist newspaper Népszava.	
Real-PR 93	Strong links to Fidesz.	
Republikon Institute	Identifies as a liberal pollster, and its founder is a former SZDSZ politician.	
SoDiSo Research	The company is the pollster of UDMR/RMDSZ and is close to the government ally newspaper Magyar Nemzet.	
Századvég	Strong links to Fidesz, and received at least 65 billion forints (€180 million) of government funding through classified decisions.	
Závecz Research	Unproven association with DK.	

=== Allegations and attacks against pollsters ===
In the run-up to the election, pro-Fidesz figures accused pollsters of undermining the government by publishing fake numbers. In August 2025, Tamás Lánczi, head of the Sovereignty Protection Office, claimed that some pollsters (21 Kutatóközpont, IDEA, Medián, Publicus, and Republikon) that were showing leads for Tisza Party were "abusing" public opinion research and carrying out "foreign assignments". To evidence his claims, he pointed to an investigation conducted by the SZH, which has been criticised as "politically charged", as well as untrue.

=== Differences in polling figures ===
Significant differences have been noted by the Hungarian media in the numbers produced by different polling companies. In January 2026, political scientist Gábor Török observed that the large differences between government- and non-government-affiliated pollsters was a new phenomenon in Hungarian politics. He suggested that the differences as they stood a few months out from the election were "unexplainable on research grounds".

Generally, pro-government pollsters were inaccurate in predicting the election result, while pro-opposition / independent pollsters were accurate.

== Graphical summary ==
=== Total ===
The graph displays the results of the polls. Those who responded "don't know" are removed, where relevant. The following graph displays a local regression of all polls.

=== By affiliation ===
The following two graphs present the polls that are government-aligned, or independent/opposition-aligned, respectively as per the table above.

Government-aligned

Independent/opposition-aligned

== Polling ==
The following table outlines the results of polls where voters where asked how they would vote in the upcoming election. The numbers correspond to the percentage of party voters saying they will vote for a particular party; as such, undecided responses are removed. Poll results are listed in the tables below in reverse chronological order, showing the most recent first, and using the date the survey's fieldwork was done, as opposed to the date of publication. If such date is unknown, the date of publication is given instead. The highest percentage figure in each polling survey is displayed in bold, and the background shaded in the leading party's colour. Any party which was not polled is displayed with an en-dash (–). Other parties in bold are expected to pass the threshold (5% for one party, 10% for a joint list of two parties, and 15% for a joint list of three or more parties) to be represented in the National Assembly. As polling is only done among Hungarian residents, but the threshold is calculated based on all list votes, (opposition) parties were expected to need about 5.25% of the domestic vote share when considering diaspora voters, who previously have voted in large margins for Fidesz.

=== 2026 ===
Fieldwork date	Polling firm	Affiliation	Sample size	Fidesz–KDNP	TISZA	DK	MH	MKKP	Others	Lead
**12 Apr 2026**	**National Election**		**6,404,403**	36.33	**55.76**	**1.16**	**5.90**	**0.85**	**0**	**19.43**
9–11 Apr 2026	Alapjogokért Központ	Government	1,000	44.5	**42.0**	4.0	**7.0**	2.5	–	2.5
8–11 Apr 2026	21 Kutatóközpont	Independent/opposition	1,500	38	**55**	1	**5**	1	–	17
7–11 Apr 2026	Medián	Independent/opposition	2,286	37.9	**55.5**	1.4	3.9	1.3	–	17.6
7–10 Apr 2026	Minerva	Independent/opposition	3,332	41.1	**50.8**	1.7	4.2	2.3	–	9.7
5–10 Apr 2026	AtlasIntel	Independent/opposition	1,587	39.3	**52.1**	1.5	**5.1**	1.4	0.6	12.8
7–9 Apr 2026	Závecz Research	Independent/opposition	1,000	40	**54**	1	4	1	–	14
7–9 Apr 2026	Publicus	Independent/opposition	1,004	39	**52**	2	**5**	2	–	13
7 Apr 2026	McLaughlin & Associates	Government	1,000	45.4	**39.7**	4.6	**7.5**	2.2	0.6	5.7
31 Mar–4 Apr 2026	Iránytű Institute	Independent/opposition	1,000	40	**51**	1	4	4	0	11
29 Mar–4 Apr 2026	IDEA	Independent/opposition	1,500	37	**50**	4	**5**	2	2	13
27–30 Mar 2026	Publicus	Independent/opposition	1,002	40	**49**	3	**6**	3	–	9
28–29 Mar 2026	Alapjogokért Központ	Government	1,000	50	**42**	2	**5**	1	–	8
24–28 Mar 2026	Závecz Research	Independent/opposition	1,000	38	**51**	3	**5**	3	–	13
23–28 Mar 2026	21 Kutatóközpont	Independent/opposition	1,500	37	**56**	1	**5**	1	–	19
26–27 Mar 2026	XXI. Század	Government	1,000	46	**41**	**5**	**6**	2	–	5
23–26 Mar 2026	Republikon	Independent/opposition	1,000	40	**49**	2	**5**	4	–	9
23–24 Mar 2026	Nézőpont	Government	1,000	46	**40**	3	**8**	3	–	6
17–20 Mar 2026	Medián	Independent/opposition	1,000	35	**58**	1	4	2	–	23
16–17 Mar 2026	Nézőpont	Government	1,000	46	**40**	3	**8**	3	–	6
10–11 Mar 2026	Minerva	Independent/opposition	1,000	40.1	**51.3**	1.4	**5.5**	1.7	–	11.2
7–9 Mar 2026	XXI. Század	Government	1,200	46	**41**	4	**6**	3	–	5
2–6 Mar 2026	21 Kutatóközpont	Independent/opposition	1,200	39	**53**	2	**5**	1	–	14
28 Feb–6 Mar 2026	IDEA	Independent/opposition	1,500	37	**49**	**5**	**6**	2	1	12
25 Feb–2 Mar 2026	McLaughlin & Associates	Government	1,000	43	**37**	**5**	**5**	3	–	6
22–28 Feb 2026	Závecz Research	Independent/opposition	1,000	38	**50**	3	**7**	2	–	12
24–27 Feb 2026	Publicus	Independent/opposition	1,001	39	**47**	4	**6**	4	–	8
23–25 Feb 2026	Nézőpont	Government	1,000	45	**40**	3	**8**	4	–	5
20–25 Feb 2026	Minerva	Independent/opposition	1,200	41.5	**50.0**	2.8	4.1	1.7	–	8.5
18–23 Feb 2026	Medián	Independent/opposition	1,000	35	**55**	2	**6**	2	–	20
20 Feb 2026	Hungarian Socialist Party (MSZP) announces it will not run in the next election.									
12–17 Feb 2026	Republikon	Independent/opposition	1,000	39	**47**	3	**6**	5	–	8
9–12 Feb 2026	Publicus	Independent/opposition	1,000	39	**48**	**5**	**5**	4	–	9
9–11 Feb 2026	Nézőpont	Government	1,000	46	**40**	4	**7**	3	0	6
2–10 Feb 2026	Iránytű Institute	Independent/opposition	1,000	37	**50**	2	**6**	**5**	0	13
7 Feb 2026	Dialogue – The Greens' Party (Párbeszéd) announces it will not run in the next election.									
31 Jan–6 Feb 2026	IDEA	Independent/opposition	1,500	38	**48**	**5**	**5**	3	1	10
2–5 Feb 2026	Alapjogokért Központ	Government	1,000	49	**42**	2	**5**	2	0	7
28 Jan–2 Feb 2026	21 Kutatóközpont	Independent/opposition	1,000	37	**53**	3	**5**	2	–	16
27–30 Jan 2026	McLaughlin & Associates	Government	1,000	43	**37**	**5**	**5**	4	2	6
21–24 Jan 2026	Publicus	Independent/opposition	1,001	40	**48**	4	**5**	3	0	8
19–24 Jan 2026	Závecz Research	Independent/opposition	1,000	39	**49**	4	**5**	3	2	10
22–23 Jan 2026	Magyar Társadalomkutató	Government	1,000	51	**41**	1	**5**	2	0	10
19–22 Jan 2026	Minerva	Independent/opposition	1,115	36.7	**54.3**	2.5	4.4	2.1	0.0	17.6
15–20 Jan 2026	Republikon	Independent/opposition	1,000	38	**47**	4	**6**	**5**	–	9
17 Jan 2026	LMP – Hungary's Green Party (LMP) announces it will not run in the next election.									
17 Jan 2026	Second Reform Era Party (2RK) announces it will not run in the next election.									
15 Jan 2026	Solution Movement (MEMO) announces it will not run in the next election.									
13 Jan 2026	Election date set for 12 April 2026									
12–14 Jan 2026	XXI. Század	Government	1,000	45	**40**	3	**7**	**5**	–	5
7–13 Jan 2026	Medián	Independent/opposition	1,000	39	**51**	1	**5**	3	1	12
5–8 Jan 2026	Alapjogokért Központ	Government	1,000	49	**41**	2	**6**	2	0	8
5–7 Jan 2026	Nézőpont	Government	1,000	47	**40**	3	**6**	4	0	7
31 Dec 2025–6 Jan 2026	IDEA	Independent/opposition	1,500	38	**48**	**5**	4	3	2 (Note: Momentum – 0 (Note: Polled despite its announcement that it would not run in the next election.); Everybody's Hungary People's Party – 0)	10
**3 Apr 2022**	**National Election**		**5,651,057**	52.45	–	**36.15** (Note: As part of United for Hungary)	**6.15**	**3.42**	**1.83**	**16.3**

=== 2025 ===
Fieldwork date	Polling firm	Sample size	Fidesz–KDNP	TISZA	DK	MSZP	Dialogue	MM	Jobbik	MH	MKKP	Others	Lead
16–20 Dec 2025	Publicus	1,001	40	**48**	**5**	–	–	–	–	**5**	3	–	8
18–19 Dec 2025	Magyar Társadalomkutató	1,000	51	**38**	2	–	–	–	–	**5**	3	1	13
15–18 Dec 2025	Alapjogokért Központ	1,000	49	**40**	2	–	–	–	–	**6**	3	–	9
15–16 Dec 2025	Nézőpont	1,000	46	**39**	3	–	–	–	–	**6**	**5**	1	7
12–16 Dec 2025	21 Kutatóközpont	1,000	36	**53**	3	–	–	–	–	**5**	2	1	17
10–15 Dec 2025	Republikon	1,000	36	**48**	4	1	–	–	0	**6**	**5**	0	12
8–12 Dec 2025	Minerva	1,000	42.5	**50.0**	2.0	–	–	–	–	2.4	2.7	0.4	7.5
27 Nov–4 Dec 2025	IDEA	1,500	39	**47**	**5**	0	0	0	1	4	3	1 (Note: NP – 1; MMN – 0)	8
1–3 Dec 2025	Real-PR 93	1,000	49	**38**	3	–	–	–	–	**7**	3	0	11
29 Nov–1 Dec 2025	XXI. Század	1,000	45	**40**	3	–	–	–	–	**8**	4	–	5
1 Sep–30 Nov 2025	Iránytű	5,000	37	**49**	2	–	–	–	–	**6**	4	1	12
23–30 Nov 2025	Závecz Research	1,000	38	**47**	4	–	–	–	–	**5**	4	2	9
26–28 Nov 2025	McLaughlin & Associates	1,000	44	**38**	3	–	–	–	–	**5**	4	6	6
24–28 Nov 2025	Republikon	1,000	33	**45**	4	1	0	–	0	**8**	**6**	2	12
21–28 Nov 2025	21 Kutatóközpont	1,500	37	**50**	4	–	–	–	–	**6**	3	0	13
24–26 Nov 2025	Nézőpont	1,000	47	**40**	3	–	–	–	–	**7**	3	0	7
20–25 Nov 2025	Medián	1,000	40	**50**	2	–	–	–	–	**5**	2	1	10
10–18 Nov 2025	Publicus	1,002	39	**48**	**6**	0	0	0	0	4	3	0 (Note: MMN – 0)	9
10–17 Nov 2025	Minerva	1,000	43.4	**47.9**	–	–	–	–	–	–	–	8.7	4.5
13–14 Nov 2025	Magyar Társadalomkutató	1,000	50	**40**	2	–	–	–	–	**5**	3	1	10
10–13 Nov 2025	Alapjogokért Központ	1,000	48	**41**	2	–	–	–	–	**5**	4	–	7
25 Sep–9 Nov 2025	Závecz Research	4,000	39	**45**	**5**	–	–	–	–	**5**	2	4	6
31 Oct–7 Nov 2025	IDEA	1,500	40	**47**	**5**	0	0	0	0	4	3	1 (Note: MMN – 0)	7
24–31 Oct 2025	Závecz Research	1,000	37	**48**	**5**	–	–	1	–	**5**	4	0	11
16–22 Oct 2025	Republikon	1,000	34	**44**	**5**	0	0	0	0	**7**	**6**	3	10
13–16 Oct 2025	Alapjogokért Központ	1,000	47	**42**	2	–	–	–	–	**6**	3	–	5
13–14 Oct 2025	Real-PR 93	1,000	49	**40**	2	–	–	–	–	**5**	3	0	9
6–13 Oct 2025	Publicus	1,000	38	**45**	**7**	1	–	–	–	**5**	4	1	7
4–13 Oct 2025	Forrás Társadalomkutató	1,000	37.2	**45.3**	4.6	3.5	–	–	0.0	**5.8**	3.5	0.0	8.1
3–10 Oct 2025	21 Kutatóközpont	1,000	35	**53**	3	–	–	–	–	**6**	2	1	18
6–7 Oct 2025	XXI. Század	1,000	44	**41**	3	–	–	–	–	**7**	**5**	–	3
30 Sep–7 Oct 2025	IDEA	1,500	38	**49**	**5**	0	0	1	0	4	2	1 (Note: 2RK – 1; MMN – 0)	11
29 Sep–1 Oct 2025	Magyar Társadalomkutató	1,000	47	**39**	2	–	–	–	–	**6**	4	2	8
25 Sep–1 Oct 2025	Republikon	1,000	35	**43**	**5**	0	1	1	0	**8**	**5**	2	8
23–25 Sep 2025	Minerva	1,000	38	**52**	–	–	–	–	–	–	–	10	14
10–14 Sep 2025	McLaughlin & Associates	1,000	43	**37**	**5**	–	–	–	–	**6**	**5**	4	6
8–12 Sep 2025	Publicus	1,000	37	**46**	**7**	0	0	0	0	**6**	4	– (Note: MMN – 0)	9
8–10 Sep 2025	Real-PR 93	1,000	47	**40**	4	–	–	–	–	**5**	3	1	7
31 Aug–6 Sep 2025	IDEA	1,500	39	**48**	**5**	0	0	0	0	4	2	2 (Note: NP – 1; Others – 1; MMN – 0)	9
28 Aug–4 Sep 2025	Medián	1,000	38	**51**	2	–	–	–	–	4	3	2	13
29 Aug–3 Sep 2025	Závecz Research	1,000	36	**46**	**5**	1	–	1	–	**6**	4	1	10
27–31 Aug 2025	21 Kutatóközpont	1,000	36	**52**	2	–	–	–	–	**5**	4	1	16
21–27 Aug 2025	Republikon	1,000	35	**41**	**7**	1	0	1	1	**8**	**5**	2	6
18–19 Aug 2025	Nézőpont	1,000	46	**38**	4	–	–	–	–	**6**	**5**	1	8
31 Jul–7 Aug 2025	IDEA	1,500	39	**46**	**5**	0	0	1	0	4	3	2 (Note: 2RK – 1; Others – 1; MMN – 0)	7
1–6 Aug 2025	Publicus	1,000	36	**46**	**8**	1	0	0	0	**6**	3	1 (Note: MMN – 0)	10
23–29 Jul 2025	Republikon	1,000	34	**43**	**6**	1	0	1	0	**6**	**5**	3 (Note: LMP – 1)	9
15–22 Jul 2025	Minerva	1,000	34	**52**	–	–	–	–	–	–	–	14	18
1–8 Jul 2025	Republikon	1,000	33	**43**	**6**	1	1	2	1	**8**	4	1	10
30 Jun–2 Jul 2025	Magyar Társadalomkutató	1,000	49	**41**	3	–	–	–	–	3	–	4	8
30 Jun–1 Jul 2025	Real-PR 93	1,000	47	**42**	4	–	–	–	–	3	3	1	5
24–27 Jun 2025	21 Kutatóközpont	1,000	34	**52**	**5**	–	–	–	–	**6**	2	1	18
19–27 Jun 2025	Závecz Research	1,500	35	**46**	**5**	1	–	1	–	**7**	4	1	11
23–25 Jun 2025	Publicus	1,001	37	**44**	**9**	1	–	1	–	**5**	1	2	7
16–17 Jun 2025	Nézőpont	1,000	44	**39**	3	–	–	–	–	**7**	4	3	5
3–7 Jun 2025	Medián	1,000	36	**51**	3	–	–	–	1	**5**	3	1	15
7 Jun 2025	Momentum Movement (Momentum) announces it will not run in the next election.												
28 May–3 Jun 2025	Republikon	1,000	34	**43**	**6**	1	0	1	1	**7**	**6**	2 (Note: LMP – 1)	9
31 May 2025	Everybody's Hungary People's Party (MMN) announces it will not run in the next election.												
15–23 May 2025	IDEA	1,500	37	**44**	**6**	0	0	1	0	**5**	4	1 (Note: NP – 1; 2RK – 1; Others – 1)	7
12–16 May 2025	Publicus	1,000	36	**43**	**9**	1	0	0	0	**5**	3	3	7
9–18 Apr 2025	Republikon	1,500	35	**39**	**7**	1	2	3	1	**8**	3	1	4
3–9 Apr 2025	Publicus	1,000	37	**41**	**9**	2	0	1	1	**5**	3	1	4
1–7 Apr 2025	21 Kutatóközpont	1,000	37	**51**	3	–	–	–	–	4	3	2	14
26 Mar–1 Apr 2025	Republikon	1,000	33	**40**	**7**	1	1	4	0	**6**	**5**	2 (Note: LMP – 1)	7
16–25 Mar 2025	Závecz Research	1,000	35	**40**	**7**	2	1	4	0	**6**	2	2 (Note: SzocDem (Socialist and Democrats) – 2; MMN – 2)	5
10–12 Mar 2025	Nézőpont	1,000	45	**35**	4	–	–	1	–	**9**	3	3	10
5–11 Mar 2025	Publicus	1,000	39	**41**	**9**	2	–	–	–	**5**	2	2	2
27 Feb–8 Mar 2025	Medián	1,000	37	**46**	3	–	–	–	–	**6**	4	4	9
1 Dec 2024–28 Feb 2025	Iránytű	6,600	39	**44**	4	–	–	–	–	**6**	4	4	5
22–26 Feb 2025	Republikon	1,000	36	**38**	**7**	1	1	1	1	**8**	**6**	2 (Note: LMP – 1)	2
20–29 Jan 2025	Publicus	3,060	37	**42**	**9**	2	0	1	0	**5**	3	1	5
14–22 Jan 2025	Republikon	1,000	32	**39**	**8**	2	1	3	2	**7**	**5**	2 (Note: LMP – 1)	7
31 Dec 2024–10 Jan 2025	IDEA	1,500	36	**45**	**5**	0	0	1	0	**7**	3	3 (Note: NP – 1; 2RK – 1; Others – 1)	9
**3 Apr 2022**	**National Election**	**5,651,057**	52.45	–	**36.15** (Note: As part of United for Hungary)					**6.15**	**3.42**	**1.83**	**16.3**

=== 2024 ===
Fieldwork date	Polling firm	Sample size	Fidesz–KDNP	DK	MSZP	Dialogue	MM	Jobbik	LMP	MMM	MH	MKKP	NP	2RK	TISZA	Others	Lead
16–18 Dec 2024	Magyar Társadalomkutató	1,000	49	4	–	–	1	–	–	–	**5**	**5**	–	–	**34**	2	15
11–17 Dec 2024	Publicus	1,000	36	**9**	2	0	1	0	0	–	**5**	3	–	–	**42**	1	6
9–11 Dec 2024	Nézőpont	1,000	47	**5**	–	–	1	–	–	–	4	3	–	–	**37**	3	10
Dec 2024	Századvég	1,000	42	**5**	1	–	3	–	–	–	**7**	**7**	–	–	**34**	1	8
29 Nov-6 Dec 2024	IDEA	1,500	37	**5**	0	0	1	0	0	1	**6**	3	2	1	**43**	1	6
28 Nov-5 Dec 2024	Republikon	1,000	31	**7**	3	1	4	2	1	–	**8**	**5**	–	–	**37**	1	6
25–27 Nov 2024	Real-PR 93	1,000	44	**5**	–	–	1	–	–	–	**7**	3	–	–	**36**	4	8
20–30 Nov 2024	Závecz Research	1,000	35	**6**	2	1	3	0	0	1	**7**	4	0	1	**39**	1 (Note: SzocDem (Socialist and Democrats) – 1)	4
20–26 Nov 2024	Medián	1,200	36	4	–	–	1	0	–	–	**6**	4	–	1	**47**	1	11
19–22 Nov 2024	Magyar Társadalomkutató	1,000	45	2	–	–	1	–	–	–	**6**	**6**	–	–	**37**	3	8
14–19 Nov 2024	Századvég	1,000	40	**5**	1	–	2	–	–	–	**7**	**9**	–	–	**35**	1	5
14–19 Nov 2024	Publicus	1,000	38	**9**	3	0	2	0	0	–	**5**	3	–	–	**39**	1	1
11–13 Nov 2024	Nézőpont	1,000	46	**5**	–	–	1	–	–	–	**8**	4	–	–	**34**	2	12
31 Oct–8 Nov 2024	IDEA	1,500	38	**6**	0	0	1	0	0	0	**7**	3	2	1	**41**	1	3
28 Oct–4 Nov 2024	Medián	1,000	39	3	1	–	1	1	–	–	**6**	3	–	–	**46**	–	7
28–30 Oct 2024	Real-PR 93	1,000	44	**6**	–	–	1	–	–	–	**7**	4	–	–	**35**	3	9
24–29 Oct 2024	Republikon	1,000	37	**7**	3	1	**5**	1	0	–	**8**	3	–	–	**36**	–	1
Oct 2024	Századvég	1,000	43	4	2	–	2	–	–	–	**7**	**7**	–	–	**34**	1	9
19 Oct 2024	DK-MSZP-Dialogue (DK–MSZP–Párbeszéd) ceases to exist.																
14–17 Oct 2024	Nézőpont	1,000	46	**5**	–	–	1	–	–	–	**6**	3	–	–	**35**	3	11
11–18 Oct 2024	Publicus	1,000	37	**8**	2	0	2	1	1	–	4	4	–	–	**39**	2	2
9–15 Oct 2024	21 Kutatóközpont	1,000	40	4	1	–	2	1	–	–	**5**	4	–	–	**42**	1	2
28 Sep–8 Oct 2024	Závecz Research	1,000	39	**7**	2	–	3	1	1	–	**5**	4	–	1	**35**	1	4
27 Sep–7 Oct 2024	IDEA	1,500	39	**7**	0	0	2	0	0	1	**7**	4	1	1	**37**	1	2
16–18 Sep 2024	Nézőpont	1,000	47	8			1	–	–	–	**6**	2	–	–	**33**	3	14
9–11 Sep 2024	Nézőpont	1,000	45	6			3	–	–	–	**5**	4	–	–	**35**	2	10
3–10 Sep 2024	Medián	1,000	42.9	3.3			2.1	2.3	0.6	0.8	4.0	3.4	–	0.9	**38.9**	–	4
28 Aug–6 Sep 2024	IDEA	1,500	39	**8**	1	1	2	1	0	0	**7**	3	2	1	**34**	1	5
21–31 Aug 2024	Závecz Research	1,000	42	**8**	2	0	2	1	1	1	**7**	2	–	–	**33**	1	9
24–31 Jul 2024	IDEA	1,500	41	**8**	1	0	2	1	0	1	**6**	3	1	1	**34**	1	7
15–17 Jul 2024	Nézőpont	1,000	47	8			–	–	–	–	**9**	5	–	–	**29**	2	18
4–10 Jul 2024	Medián	1,000	42.8	9.2			2.8	0.8	0.7	0.7	**7.1**	4.6	–	0.5	**30.7**	–	12.1
3–8 Jul 2024	Republikon	1,000	41	**7**	3	0	4	1	0	1	**5**	**6**	0	0	**31**	1 (Note: SzocDem (Socialist and Democrats) – 1, MEMO – 0)	10
19–27 Jun 2024	IDEA	1,500	41	**8**	1	0	3	1	0	1	**6**	3	1	2	**32**	1	9
**9 Jun 2024**	**EP Election**	**4,569,620**	44.8	**8.0**			**3.7**	**1.0**	**0.9**	**0.6**	**6.7**	**3.6**	–	**0.7**	**29.6**	**0.4**	**15.2**
6–8 Jun 2024	21 Kutatóközpont	1,000	44	8			3	–	–	1	**7**	4	–	1	**32**	–	12
3–5 Jun 2024	Publicus	1,001	43	**15**			4	2	1	–	**5**	4	–	–	**25**	1	18
31 May–5 Jun 2024	Medián	1,500	50	9			3	1	–	–	**5**	4	–	1	**27**	1	23
24 May–2 Jun 2024	Závecz Research	1,000	45	11			4	1	2	1	**5**	3	–	1	**27**	0	18
27–29 May 2024	Medián	1,000	48	7			**5**	1	0	1	**6**	2	0	1	**29**	0	19
27–29 May 2024	Real-PR 93	1,000	45	10			1	1	0	1	**5**	**7**	–	2	**28**	1 (Note: MEMO – 1)	17
20–29 May 2024	IDEA	1,500	44	12			4	0	0	1	**5**	4	–	2	**26**	2	18
20–28 May 2024	Századvég	1,000	45	10			3	1	1	1	**6**	**9**	0	1	**23**	0	22
22–24 May 2024	Alapjogokért Központ	1,000	47	8			2	1	1	1	**6**	**6**	0	1	**26**	1	21
20–22 May 2024	Nézőpont	1,000	47	9			1	1	1	1	**7**	**7**	0	1	**24**	1	23
May 2024	Magyar Társadalomkutató	4,000	51	8			1	1	2	1	4	**5**	0	1	**25**	0	26
2–10 May 2024	Závecz Research	1,000	39	**17**			4	1	1	2	**6**	3	–	1	**26**	0	13
25 Apr–4 May 2024	IDEA	1,500	39	**15**	1	1	4	1	1	2	4	4	2	3	**21**	2	18
29 Apr–2 May 2024	Nézőpont	1,000	44	13			1	1	0	1	**6**	**7**	2	3	**22**	–	22
26–30 Apr 2024	Publicus	1,000	42	**24**			3	1	1	–	4	2	–	–	**23**	–	18
26–29 Apr 2024	Medián	1,000	45	9			4	1	1	2	4	**6**	1	2	**25**	–	20
22–26 Apr 2024	Republikon	1,000	35	**22**			**5**	2	2	0	**6**	**6**	1	1	**18**	2	13
17–19 Apr 2024	Iránytű	1,073	50	10			3	1	–	–	3	4	–	2	**26**	1	24
9–12 Apr 2024	Iránytű	1,073	53	9			3	2	–	–	**6**	4	–	1	**20**	2	33
4–11 Apr 2024	Závecz Research	1,000	34	**22**	4	1	**8**	2	2	1	**8**	**6**	2	1	–	9	12
4–11 Apr 2024	Závecz Research	1,000	33	**26**			**7**	1	3	–	**8**	5	–	–	**14**	3	7
10 Apr 2024	Péter Magyar announces his bid to run in the European Parliament election with the Respect and Freedom Party (TISZA) party.																
31 Mar–8 Apr 2024	IDEA	1,500	38	**17**	2	1	**6**	1	1	3	**6**	**6**	4	–	–	15	21
2–4 Apr 2024	Nézőpont	1,000	47	13			4	1	1	1	**6**	**11**	2	2	**13** (Note: This poll was conducted prior to Péter Magyar's announcement he would work with TISZA. The poll prompted for Magyar Péter pártja (Péter Magyar's party) instead.)	–	34
26 Mar–2 Apr 2024	Republikon	1,000	36	**18**	**5**	2	**7**	2	3	0	**8**	**7**	1	0	–	11	20
26 Mar–2 Apr 2024	Republikon	1,000	34	**16**	4	2	4	2	3	1	**7**	**5**	1	0	**15**	5	18
28 Mar 2024	DK-MSZP-Dialogue (DK–MSZP–Párbeszéd) is formed.																
15 Mar 2024	Péter Magyar announces his political movement, called 'Rise up, Hungarians! (Talpra, Magyarok!)'.																
29 Feb–12 Mar 2024	IDEA	1,500	42	**18**	3	2	**8**	2	1	–	**7**	**7**	3	–		7	24
6–9 Mar 2024	Medián	1,000	46	**12**	1	1	**8**	3	1	3	**8**	**11**	2	3		1	34
29 Feb–9 Mar 2024	Závecz Research	1,000	45	**19**	4	2	**7**	4	2	0	**10**	4	1	0		2	26
4–6 Mar 2024	Magyar Társadalomkutató	1,000	48	**9**	4	0	**8**	1	1	3	**10**	**11**	3	2		–	37
26–28 Feb 2024	Nézőpont	1,000	47	**14**	2	2	**7**	2	2	4	**8**	**8**	1	4		–	33
21–28 Feb 2024	Republikon	1,000	37	**17**	**5**	3	**9**	4	4	0	**9**	**8**	1	0		3	20
22–26 Feb 2024	21 Kutatóközpont	1,200	44	**18**	2	1	**9**	3	1	3	**7**	**8**	1	2		–	26 (Note: without leaders)
22–26 Feb 2024	21 Kutatóközpont	1,200	44	**17**	1	1	**9**	2	1	**5**	**5**	**6**	3	3		–	27 (Note: with leaders)
10 Feb 2024	President Katalin Novák resigns from office over the pedophile pardon scandal																
31 Jan–9 Feb 2024	IDEA	1,500	44	**20**	3	1	**7**	1	2	–	**9**	**6**	3	–		4	24
15–20 Jan 2024	Republikon	1,000	43	**19**	**5**	3	**7**	3	4	–	**9**	**8**	–	–		–	24
9–11 Jan 2024	Medián	1,000	53	**11**	2	1	**7**	5	1	1	**8**	**6**	–	2		–	42
Jan 2024	Századvég	1,000	51	**11**	1	1	**8**	1	1	1	**10**	**9**	1	–		5	40
8–9 Jan 2024	Alapjogokért Központ	1,000	51	**11**	1	1	4	2	2	1	**10**	**9**	4	4		–	40
2–5 Jan 2024	Nézőpont	1,000	50	**14**	2	1	**8**	3	2	2	**7**	**8**	1	2		–	36
**3 Apr 2022**	**National Election**	**5,651,057**	52.45	**36.15** (Note: As part of United for Hungary)							**6.15**	**3.42**	–			**1.83**	**16.3**

=== 2022–2023 ===
Fieldwork date	Polling firm	Sample size	Fidesz–KDNP	DK	MSZP	Dialogue	MM	Jobbik	LMP	MMM	MH	MKKP	NP	2RK	Others	Lead
Dec 2023	Magyar Társadalomkutató	4,000	49	**10**	2	0	4	2	1	2	**10**	**10**	3	2	4	39
18–21 Dec 2023	Real-PR 93	1,000	47	**12**	2	1	**6**	3	2	2	**8**	**11**	3	3	–	35
12–15 Dec 2023	Publicus	1,003	46	**18**	**6**	1	**7**	2	1	1	4	4	–	–	3	28
30 Nov–13 Dec 2023	IDEA	1,500	43	**20**	3	1	**7**	1	2	–	**9**	**7**	3	–	4	23
17–24 Nov 2023	Republikon	1,000	43	**18**	**5**	2	**7**	4	**5**	–	**9**	**7**	–	–	–	25
31 Oct–16 Nov 2023	IDEA	1,000	45	**20**	3	1	**7**	2	1	–	**8**	**6**	3	–	4	25
29 Oct–8 Nov 2023	Závecz Research	1,000	48	**19**	4	2	**6**	4	3	1	**8**	4	1	–	2	29
17–24 Oct 2023	Republikon	1,000	43	**18**	**5**	2	**7**	3	**5**	–	**10**	**7**	–	–	–	25
29 Sep–13 Oct 2023	IDEA	1,800	45	**19**	3	1	**8**	1	1	–	**9**	**5**	2	–	6	26
Sep 2023	Medián	1,000	46	**12**	2	1	**6**	**5**	1	3	**10**	**7**	5	2	–	34
18–25 Sep 2023	Republikon	1,000	42	**18**	**5**	2	**8**	3	4	–	**10**	**8**	–	–	–	24
8–18 Sep 2023	Závecz Research	1,000	46	**19**	4	2	**6**	4	3	–	**10**	**5**	–	–	1	27
16 Sep 2023	Péter Márki-Zay's Everybody's Hungary People's Party (MMN) officially becomes a party.															
28 Aug–8 Sep 2023	IDEA	1,800	45	**19**	2	1	**8**	2	2	–	**10**	**6**	–	–	5	26
7 Sep 2023	Gábor Vona's Second Reform Era Party (2RK) officially becomes a party.															
4–6 Sep 2023	Nézőpont	1,000	51	**10**	2	0	**8**	**5**	2	2	**9**	**8**	3		–	41
24–29 Aug 2023	21 Kutatóközpont	1,500	42	**15**	4	1	**9**	**7**	1	4	**8**	**5**	4		–	27
16–23 Aug 2023	Republikon	1,000	42	**17**	4	2	**10**	4	4	–	**10**	**7**	–		–	25
20 Aug 2023	Péter Jakab's On the People's Side (NP) officially becomes a party.															
28 Jul–9 Aug 2023	IDEA	1,800	46	**20**	2	1	**8**	2	2	–	**9**	**6**	–		5	26
14–25 Jul 2023	Republikon	1,000	44	**18**	**5**	2	**9**	4	4	–	**8**	**6**	–		–	26
28 Jun–19 Jul 2023	IDEA	1,800	48	**20**	2	1	**8**	2	2	–	**8**	**6**	–		3	28
26–30 Jun 2023	Publicus	807	46.0	**21.4**	**9.5**	–	**7.1**	3.6	1.2	1.2	**6.0**	2.0	–		2.0	24.6
19–23 Jun 2023	Republikon	1,000	46	**16**	**5**	2	**9**	4	5	–	**7**	**6**	–		–	30
25 May–10 Jun 2023	IDEA	1,800	48	**20**	2	1	**8**	2	2	–	**8**	**6**	–		3	28
26–31 May 2023	Medián	1,000	49	**14**	1	1	**8**	4	3	2	**7**	**9**	2		0	35
27 Apr–19 May 2023	IDEA	1,800	48	**19**	3	1	**8**	2	2	–	**9**	**6**	–		2	29
15–17 May 2023	Nézőpont	1,000	51	**16**	2	1	**9**	**5**	3	–	**6**	3	–		4	35
28 Apr–5 May 2023	Závecz Research	1,000	50	**19**	4	2	**6**	4	2	–	**7**	3	–		3	31
21–28 Apr 2023	Republikon	1,000	48	**17**	**5**	2	**7**	4	4	–	**8**	**5**	–		–	31
25 Mar–13 Apr 2023	IDEA	1,800	49	**20**	2	1	**8**	1	2	–	**9**	**5**	–		3	29
Mar 2023	Századvég	1,000	45.5	**10.2**	1.1	1.1	**9.1**	2.3	2.3	–	**10.2**	**12.5**	–		5.7	35.3
27–29 Mar 2023	Magyar Társadalomkutató	1,000	52	**12**	2	1	**6**	4	3	2	**8**	**10**	–		–	40
20–24 Mar 2023	Republikon	1,000	47	**20**	**5**	2	**8**	3	4	–	**8**	3	–		0	27
25 Feb–16 Mar 2023	IDEA	1,800	48	**19**	2	2	**7**	2	1	–	**9**	**6**	–		4	29
28 Feb–8 Mar 2023	Závecz Research	1,000	49	**18**	**5**	1	**6**	4	3	1	**9**	3	–		1	31
21–27 Feb 2023	Medián	1,000	51	**14**	1	2	**9**	**5**	2	2	**6**	**6**	–		1	37
20–22 Feb 2023	Nézőpont	1,000	52	**12**	2	1	**5**	4	2	2	**9**	**9**	2		–	40
10–15 Feb 2023	Republikon	1,000	47	**20**	**6**	3	**6**	3	**5**	–	**7**	3	–		0	27
30 Jan–15 Feb 2023	IDEA	1,800	48	**20**	3	2	**6**	2	1	–	**9**	**5**	–		4	28
31 Dec 2022–11 Jan 2023	IDEA	1,800	48	**20**	2	3	**6**	3	1	–	**9**	**5**	–		3	28
2–6 Jan 2023	Republikon	1,000	45	**20**	**6**	2	**6**	**5**	4	–	**9**	3	–		0	25
2–4 Jan 2023	Nézőpont	1,000	56	**14**	2	1	**6**	2	3	–	**6**	4	–		6	42
12–16 Dec 2022	Publicus	1,002	48.0	**15.3**	**7.1**	1.2	**7.1**	**5.9**	2.4	1.2	4.0	4.7	–		2.0	32.7
9–15 Dec 2022	Medián	1,000	50	**12**	2	1	**8**	**5**	2	3	**8**	**7**	2		–	38
12–14 Dec 2022	Real-PR 93	1,000	51	**13**	2	1	**6**	**6**	1	–	**10**	**7**	2		1	38
29 Nov–12 Dec 2022	IDEA	1,800	47	**19**	3	3	**6**	4	1	–	**10**	4	–		3	28
23–28 Nov 2022	Republikon	1,000	46	**18**	**6**	2	**6**	4	4	–	**10**	4	–		0	28
14–22 Nov 2022	Závecz Research	1,000	50	**17**	**5**	1	**6**	**5**	3	–	**8**	3	–		2	33
28 Oct–8 Nov 2022	IDEA	1,800	52	**19**	3	2	**5**	3	1	–	**8**	4	–		3	33
19–24 Oct 2022	Republikon	1,000	48	**17**	**6**	2	**8**	4	3	–	**10**	2	–		0	31
15–21 Oct 2022	Medián	1,000	50.6	**11.7**	1.3	1.3	**6.5**	2.6	2.6	2.6	**9.1**	**9.1**	2.6		–	38.9
17–19 Oct 2022	Nézőpont	1,000	54.2	**18.3**	4.1	0.0	**6.1**	4.1	2.0	–	4.2	**6.1**	2.0		–	37.2
29 Sep–9 Oct 2022	IDEA	1,800	51	**20**	2	2	**6**	4	1	–	**9**	3	–		2	31
14–22 Sep 2022	Závecz Research	1,000	52	**15**	**5**	2	**6**	**5**	3	–	**8**	2	–		2	37
31 Aug–9 Sep 2022	IDEA	1,800	50	**17**	2	3	**6**	3	2	–	**9**	**5**	–		3	33
29–31 Aug 2022	Nézőpont	1,000	52.8	**11.9**	2.0	0.0	**9.9**	**5.9**	2.0	–	**6.7**	**7.9**	–		0	40.9
25–30 Aug 2022	Publicus	1,000	48.0	**13.8**	**7.5**	1.3	**8.8**	3.7	2.5	1.3	5.0	**5.0**	–		3.0	34.2
20 Aug 2022	Péter Jakab founds a new movement called On the People's Side (NP)															
27 Jul–7 Aug 2022	IDEA	1,800	51	**17**	2	2	**6**	**6**	1	–	**9**	**5**			1	34
20–22 Jul 2022	Publicus	1,004	44.0	**12.0**	**7.2**	1.2	**8.4**	**7.2**	2.4	1.2	**7.2**	**6.0**			2.0	32.0
9–20 Jul 2022	IDEA	1,800	54	**14**	2	2	**6**	**5**	1	–	**9**	**6**			1	40
11–13 Jul 2022	Nézőpont	1,000	56.3	**8.8**	1.8	1.8	**8.8**	**7.0**	1.8	–	**5.2**	**8.8**			0.0	47.5
20–22 Jun 2022	Nézőpont	1,000	57.9	**9.8**	1.6	1.6	**6.5**	**6.5**	1.6	–	**6.3**	**8.1**			0.0	48.1
16–24 May 2022	Viktor Orbán forms his fifth government															
29 Apr–9 May 2022	IDEA	1,800	57	**12**	2	2	**7**	**6**	1	–	**8**	4			1	45
25 Apr–4 May 2022	Závecz Research	1,000	60	**11**	**5**	1	**5**	**5**	3	–	**8**	1			1	49
26–30 Apr 2022	Medián	1,000	60	**7**	2	1	**8**	3	1	3	**7**	**6**			2	52
20–24 Apr 2022	Republikon	1,000	55	**12**	**5**	4	**9**	**6**	3	–	4	2			0	43
**3 Apr 2022**	**National Election**	**5,651,057**	52.45	**36.15** (Note: As part of United for Hungary)							**6.15**	**3.42**	–		**1.83**	**16.3**

== Coalition scenario polling ==
The following table outlines that the former United for Hungary parties would run in an alliance again in the next election. The numbers correspond to the percentage of party voters saying they will vote for a particular party; as such, undecided responses are removed. The same formatting as the main polling table applies.

Fieldwork date	Polling firm	Sample size	Fidesz–KDNP	DK	MSZP	Dialogue	MM	Jobbik	LMP	MMM	MH	MKKP	NP	2RK	TISZA	Others	Lead
9 Jun 2024	EP Election	4,569,620	44.8	14.2							6.7	3.6	–	0.7	29.6	0.4	15.2
Mar 2023	Századvég	1,000	47.7	28.4							10.2	12.5	–			2.2 (Note: MEMO – 1.1, NÉP (Party of Normal Life) – 1.1)	19.3
27–29 Mar 2023	Nézőpont	1,000	51	26							12	8	–			3	25
12–16 Dec 2022	Publicus	1,002	48	41							4	4	–			2	7
9–15 Dec 2022	Medián	1,000	47	34							10	9	–			0	13
25–30 Aug 2022	Publicus	1,000	48	40							5	4	–			3	8
20–22 Jul 2022	Publicus	1,004	44	42							6	5	–			2	2
Jun 2022	Századvég	1,000	53.7	26.3							9.5	8.4				2.1	27.4
25 Apr–4 May 2022	Závecz Research	1,000	60	31							7	1				1	29
19–21 Apr 2022	Nézőpont	1,000	56	34							5	3				2	22
3 Apr 2022	National Election	5,651,057	54.1	34.4							5.9	3.3				2.3	19.7

== Seat projections ==
The table includes the chances of each party and minority (German and Romani) organizations mandate gain, referring to the percentage results of various polls. Other parties in bold are represented in the National Assembly. 100 seats in the National Assembly are needed for a majority, while 133 seats are needed for a two-thirds supermajority to amend the Constitution of Hungary. According to the electoral rules, a party must obtain at least 5 seats to establish a political group, which is guaranteed if it passes the threshold in party list. For two-party alliances it must have at least 10 seats and for three or more party alliances it must have at least 15 seats, but if a member party obtain less than 5 seats, it is unable to form a group, however its politicians can either serve as Independent MP or join to another group. All of the 13 ethnic minorities can win one of the 93 party lists seats if they register as a specific list and reach a lowered quota of 0.27% of the total of party list votes.

Publication Date	Polling Date	Projection by	Polling by	Fidesz–KDNP	DK	MSZP	Dialogue	MH	MNOÖ	MKKP	ORÖ	TISZA	Majority
**12 Apr 2026**		**National Election**		52	0	–		**6**	**0**	**0**	**0**	141	**42**
8–11 Apr 2026		21 Kutatóközpont		61	0	0	0	**5**	0	0	**1**	132	33
7–11 Apr 2026		Medián		63	0	0	0	0	0	0	**1**	135	36
11 Apr 2026		SzázKilencvenKilenc		75	0	0	0	**5**	0	0	**1**	118	19
10 Apr 2026		taktikaiszavazas.hu		62	0	0	0	**6**	0	0	**1**	130	31
7–10 Apr 2026		Minerva		80	0	0	0	0	0	0	**1**	118	19
8 Apr 2026		Medián		52	0	0	0	**5**	0	0	**1**	141	42
5 Apr 2026		Vox Populi		83	0	0	0	**6**	–	0	0	110	11
4 Apr 2026		taktikaiszavazas.hu		71	0	0	0	**6**	0	0	**1**	121	22
3 Apr 2026		SzázKilencvenKilenc		82.3	0	0	0	**4.0**	0	0	0	112.7	13.2
3 Apr 2026		Nézőpont		109	0	0	0	**8**	0	0	**1**	80	10
29 Mar 2026		Vox Populi		84	0	0	0	**7**	–	0	0	108	9
27 Mar 2026		taktikaiszavazas.hu		76	0	0	0	**6**	0	0	**1**	116	17
22 Mar 2026		Vox Populi		86	0	0	0	**7**	–	0	0	107	8
20 Mar 2026		taktikaiszavazas.hu		86	0	0	0	**6**	0	0	0	107	8
13 Mar 2026		taktikaiszavazas.hu		80	0	0	0	**6**	0	0	0	113	14
8 Mar 2026		Vox Populi		87	0	0	0	**7**	–	0	0	106	7
1 Mar 2026		taktikaiszavazas.hu		76	0	0	0	**6**	0	0	0	117	18
1 Mar 2026		Vox Populi		87	0	0	0	**7**	–	0	0	106	7
22 Feb 2026		taktikaiszavazas.hu		82	0	0	0	**6**	0	0	0	111	12
22 Feb 2026		Vox Populi		87	0	0	0	**7**	–	0	0	106	7
15 Feb 2026		Vox Populi		89	0	0	0	**7**	–	0	0	105	6
8 Feb 2026		Vox Populi		89	0	0	0	**7**	–	0	0	104	5
1 Feb 2026		Vox Populi		87	0	0	0	**6**	–	0	0	107	8
27 Jan 2026		taktikaiszavazas.hu		83	0	0	0	**6**	0	0	0	110	12
25 Jan 2026		Vox Populi		90	0	0	0	**6**	–	0	0	104	5
18 Jan 2026		Vox Populi		90	0	0	0	**6**	–	0	0	103	4
17 Jan 2026		taktikaiszavazas.hu		81	0	0	0	**6**	**1**	0	0	111	12
11 Jan 2026		Vox Populi		90	0	0	0	**6**	–	0	0	104	5
4 Jan 2026		Vox Populi		90	0	0	0	**7**	–	0	0	103	4
29 Dec 2025		Publicus		79	**5**	0	0	**5**	0	0	0	110	11
23 Dec 2025		taktikaiszavazas.hu		82	0	0	0	**6**	**1**	0	0	110	11
21 Dec 2025		Vox Populi		90	0	0	0	**7**	–	0	0	104	5
19 Dec 2025	15 Dec 2025	Vox Populi	Nézőpont	116	0	0	0	**6**	**1**	0	0	76	17
19 Dec 2025	14 Dec 2025	Vox Populi	21 Kutatóközpont	62	0	0	0	**6**	**1**	0	0	130	31
19 Dec 2025	12 Dec 2025	Vox Populi	Republikon	65	0	0	0	**5**	**1**	**5**	0	123	24
19 Dec 2025	30 Nov 2025	Vox Populi	IDEA	72	**5**	0	0	0	**1**	0	0	121	22
19 Dec 2025	27 Nov 2025	Vox Populi	McLaughlin & Associates	113	**6**	0	0	**5**	**1**	0	0	80	14
17 Dec 2025		21 Kutatóközpont		59	0	0	0	**5**	**1**	0	0	134	35
8 Dec 2025		taktikaiszavazas.hu		85	0	0	0	**6**	**1**	0	0	107	8
6 Dec 2025	2 Dec 2025	Vox Populi	Real-PR 93	127	0	0	0	**7**	**1**	0	0	64	28
6 Dec 2025	26 Nov 2025	Vox Populi	Závecz Research	75	0	0	0	**5**	**1**	0	0	118	19
6 Dec 2025	22 Nov 2025	Vox Populi	Republikon	63	**6**	0	0	**7**	**1**	0	0	122	23
3 Dec 2025	30 Nov 2025	Vox Populi	XXI. Század	111	0	0	0	**8**	**1**	0	0	79	12
3 Dec 2025	25 Nov 2025	Vox Populi	Nézőpont	117	**7**	0	0	0	**1**	0	0	74	18
3 Dec 2025	24 Nov 2025	Vox Populi	21 Kutatóközpont	72	0	0	0	**6**	**1**	0	0	120	21
3 Dec 2025	22 Nov 2025	Vox Populi	Medián	80	0	0	0	**5**	**1**	0	0	113	14
3 Dec 2025	14 Nov 2025	Vox Populi	Publicus	68	**7**	0	0	0	**1**	0	0	123	24
3 Dec 2025	13 Nov 2025	Vox Populi	Magyar Társadalomkutató	128	0	0	0	0	**1**	0	0	70	29
3 Dec 2025	11 Nov 2025	Vox Populi	Alapjogokért Központ	118	0	0	0	0	**1**	0	0	80	19
3 Dec 2025	3 Nov 2025	Vox Populi	IDEA	75	**5**	0	0	0	**1**	0	0	118	19
3 Dec 2025	27 Oct 2025	Vox Populi	Závecz Research	67	**5**	0	0	**5**	**1**	0	0	121	22
3 Dec 2025	19 Oct 2025	Vox Populi	Republikon	63	**6**	0	0	**5**	**1**	**6**	0	118	19
3 Dec 2025	13 Oct 2025	Vox Populi	Real-PR 93	123	0	0	0	**5**	**1**	0	0	70	24
2 Dec 2025		21 Kutatóközpont		65	0	0	0	**7**	**1**	0	0	126	27
26 Oct 2025	14 Oct 2025	Vox Populi	Alapjogokért Központ	112	0	0	0	**6**	**1**	0	0	80	13
26 Oct 2025	9 Oct 2025	Vox Populi	Publicus	76	**7**	0	0	**5**	**1**	0	0	110	11
26 Oct 2025	7 Oct 2025	Vox Populi	XXI. Század	108	0	0	0	**6**	**1**	0	0	84	9
26 Oct 2025	6 Oct 2025	Vox Populi	21 Kutatóközpont	63	0	0	0	**6**	**1**	0	0	129	30
26 Oct 2025	3 Oct 2025	Vox Populi	IDEA	64	**5**	0	0	0	**1**	0	0	129	30
26 Oct 2025	30 Sep 2025	Vox Populi	Magyar Társadalomkutató	119	0	0	0	**6**	**1**	0	0	73	20
26 Oct 2025	28 Sep 2025	Vox Populi	Republikon	73	**5**	0	0	**7**	**1**	**5**	0	108	9
21 Sep 2025	12 Sep 2025	Vox Populi	McLaughlin & Associates	110	**3** (Note: Estimate is an average (not median or mode) of simulations, which can give a seat count otherwise virtually impossible, that appears in 0 outcomes in the simulations.)	0	0	**5**	0	**3**	**1**	77	11
21 Sep 2025	10 Sep 2025	Vox Populi	Publicus	71	**6**	0	0	**4**	**1**	0	**1**	116	17
21 Sep 2025	09 Sep 2025	Vox Populi	Real-PR 93	117	**3**	0	0	**1**	0	0	**1**	77	18
12 Sep 2025	3 Sep 2025	Vox Populi	IDEA	75	**3**	0	0	**1**	0	0	**1**	119	20
10 Sep 2025	4 Sep 2025	Vox Populi	Medián	67	0	0	0	0	**1**	0	0	131	32
10 Sep 2025	31 Aug 2025	Vox Populi	Medián	69	0	0	0	0	**1**	0	0	129	30
10 Sep 2025	31 Aug 2025	Vox Populi	Závecz Research	71	**5**	0	0	**6**	**1**	0	0	116	17
4 Sep 2025	29 Aug 2025	Vox Populi	21 Kutatóközpont	64	0	0	0	**6**	**1**	0	0	128	29
4 Sep 2025	24 Aug 2025	Vox Populi	Republikon	75	**6**	0	0	**7**	**1**	**5**	0	105	6
4 Sep 2025	18 Aug 2025	Vox Populi	Nézőpont	116	0	0	0	**6**	**1**	0	0	76	17
4 Sep 2025	3 Aug 2025	Vox Populi	Publicus	63	**7**	0	0	**5**	**1**	0	0	123	24
4 Sep 2025	3 Aug 2025	Vox Populi	IDEA	83	0	0	0	0	**1**	0	0	115	16
27 Aug 2025		Nézőpont		117	0	0	0	**7**	**1**	**5**	0	69	18
29 Jul 2025	4 Jul 2025	Vox Populi	Republikon	66	**6**	0	0	**7**	**1**	0	0	119	20
29 Jul 2025	1 Jul 2025	Vox Populi	Magyar Társadalomkutató	121	0	0	0	0	**1**	0	0	77	22
29 Jul 2025	30 Jun 2025	Vox Populi	Real-PR 93	112	0	0	0	0	**1**	0	0	86	13
16 Jul 2025		Mandiner		109	0	0	0	0	**1**	0	0	89	10
2 Jul 2025		Választási földrajz		81	0	0	0	**7**	**1**	0	**1**	109	10
1 Jul 2025	25 Jun 2025	Vox Populi	21 Kutatóközpont	61	0	0	0	**6**	**1**	0	0	131	32
1 Jul 2025	24 Jun 2025	Vox Populi	Publicus	78	0	0	0	**9**	**1**	0	0	111	12
1 Jul 2025	20 Jun 2025	Vox Populi	Závecz Research	70	**5**	0	0	**7**	**1**	0	0	116	17
1 Jul 2025	16 Jun 2025	Vox Populi	Nézőpont	111	0	0	0	**7**	**1**	0	0	80	12
27 Jun 2025		Nézőpont		108	0	0	0	**8**	**1**	0	0	82	9
18 Jun 2025	5 May 2025	Vox Populi	Medián	62	0	0	0	**5**	**1**	0	0	131	32
18 Jun 2025	31 May 2025	Vox Populi	Republikon	73	**6**	0	0	**6**	**1**	0	0	107	8
4 Apr 2025	5 Jun 2025	Választási földrajz	21 Kutatóközpont	65	0	0	0	0	**1**	0	0	133	34
31 May 2025	19 May 2025	Vox Populi	IDEA	73	**6**	0	0	0	**1**	0	0	119	20
31 May 2025	14 May 2025	Vox Populi	Publicus	80	**10**	0	0	0	**1**	0	0	108	9
6 May 2025	13 Apr 2025	Vox Populi	Republikon	83	**7**	0	0	**8**	**1**	0	0	100	1
6 May 2025	6 Apr 2025	Vox Populi	Publicus	91	**10**	0	0	0	**1**	0	0	97	Hung
7 Apr 2025	4 Apr 2025	Vox Populi	21 Kutatóközpont	71	0	0	0	0	**1**	0	0	127	28
7 Apr 2025	29 Mar 2025	Vox Populi	Republikon	81	**7**	0	0	**6**	**1**	**5**	0	99	Hung
7 Apr 2025	20 Mar 2025	Vox Populi	Závecz Research	84	**7**	0	0	**6**	**1**	0	0	101	2
7 Apr 2025	11 Mar 2025	Vox Populi	Nézőpont	128	0	0	0	**8**	**1**	0	0	62	29
7 Apr 2025	9 Mar 2025	Vox Populi	Publicus	96	**9**	0	0	0	**1**	0	0	93	Hung
3 Mar 2025	13 Mar 2025	Választási földrajz	Medián	73	0	0	0	**7**	0	0	0	119	20
12 Mar 2025	3 Mar 2025	Vox Populi	Medián	82	0	0	0	**6**	**1**	0	0	110	11
12 Mar 2025	24 Jan 2025	Vox Populi	Publicus	85	**8**	0	0	**5**	**1**	0	0	100	1
12 Mar 2025	14 Jan 2025	Vox Populi	Iránytű	102	0	0	0	**7**	**1**	0	0	89	3
12 Mar 2025	5 Jan 2025	Vox Populi	IDEA	72	**5**	0	0	**6**	**1**	0	0	115	16
12 Mar 2025	17 Dec 2024	Vox Populi	Magyar Társadalomkutató	139	0	0	0	0	**1**	0	0	59	40
12 Mar 2025	10 Dec 2024	Vox Populi	Nézőpont	135	0	0	0	0	**1**	0	0	63	36
12 Mar 2025	6 Dec 2024	Vox Populi	Századvég	118	0	0	0	**7**	**1**	**7**	0	66	19
12 Mar 2025	26 Nov 2024	Vox Populi	Real-PR 93	119	0	0	0	**7**	**1**	0	0	72	20
12 Mar 2025	25 Nov 2024	Vox Populi	Závecz Research	89	**7**	0	0	**7**	**1**	0	0	95	Hung
4 Mar 2025	24 Feb 2025	Vox Populi	Republikon	94	**6**	0	0	**7**	**1**	**6**	0	85	Hung
4 Mar 2025	18 Jan 2025	Vox Populi	Republikon	77	**7**	0	0	**7**	**1**	**5**	0	102	3
16 Dec 2024		Nézőpont		121	**6**	0	0	0	**1**	0	0	71	22
10 Jun 2024		Nézőpont		135	**10** (Note: The three-party alliance, due to domestic electoral rules, would have not got any mandates on party list in reality with its EP election result if it had been a national one.)			**8**	**1**	0	0	45	36 (Note: According to the results of EP election if it had been a national one.)
3 Apr 2023		Nézőpont		148	**30** (Note: If the former EM parties run together again in the next election.)			**12**	**1**	**8**	0		49
**3 Apr 2022**		**National Election**		135	**57** (Note: DK: 15 seats; Momentum: 10 seats; MSZP: 10 seats; Jobbik: 10 seats; Párbeszéd: 6 seats; LMP: 5 seats; Independent: 1 seat.)			**6**	**1**	**0**	– (Note: The organization ran in 2014 and 2018 but did not in 2022.)		**36**

== Regional polling ==
This section includes poll results conducted in particular regions and cities.

=== Budapest ===
Fieldwork date	Polling firm	Sample size	Fidesz–KDNP	DK	MSZP	Dialogue	MM	Jobbik	LMP	MMM	MH	MKKP	NP	2RK	TISZA	Other	Lead
12 Apr 2026	National Election	1,056,573	28.36	1.69	–	–	–	–	–	–	4.59	1.42	–	–	63.76	–	35.4
1 Sep–30 Nov 2025	Iránytű	5,000	32	4	–	–	–	–	–	–	5	7	–	–	51	2	19
18–27 Oct 2025	21 Kutatóközpont	1,000	26	4	–	–	1	–	–	–	4	5	–	1	58	1	32
24 Oct 2024–3 Jun 2025	Republikon	1,200	21	13	1	1	3	1	1	–	6	6	–	–	48	–	27
1 Dec 2024–28 Feb 2025	Iránytű	6,600	28	5	–	–	–	–	–	–	5	7	–	–	48	6	20
9 Jun 2024	EP Election	799,809	33.1	12.3			7.9	0.4	1.4	0.5	4.4	5.9	–	0.9	32.8	0.3	0.3
9 Jun 2024	Local Elections	792,292	28.7	16.6			5.0	–	10.2 (Note: On a joint list with Vitézy Dáviddal Budapestért Egyesület (Association with Dávid Vitézy for Budapest).)	–	3.8	7.9	0.2	–	27.3	0.3	1.4
4–6 June 2024	Publicus	1,042	24	23			7	–	16	–	1	9	–	–	20	1	1
23–25 May 2024	Medián	1,000	29	20			5	–	11	–	3	8	–	–	24	–	5
17–22 May 2024	Medián	1,000	31	23			6	–	7	–	4	12	–	–	16	1	8
Aug–Nov 2023	IDEA	1,307	36	23	3	3	11	1	2	1	7	10	2	–		1	13
10–28 Jul 2023	Republikon	1,500	35	21	7	5	12	4	5	1	4	5	–			–	14
3 Apr 2022	National Election	950,739	40.9	47.8							4.1	5.2				2.0	6.8

==== Budapest VIII. ====
Fieldwork date	Polling firm	Sample size	Fidesz–KDNP	DK	MSZP	Dialogue	MM	Jobbik	LMP	MMM	MH	MKKP	NP	2RK	TISZA	Others	Lead
12 Apr 2026	National Election	35,872	29.48	1.43	–	–	–	–	–	–	4.14	1.73	–	–	63.22	–	33.74
Aug 2025	21 Kutatóközpont	800	24	4	–	–	–	–	–	–	4	16	–	–	50	1	26
9 Jun 2024	EP Election	26,455	36.3	9.9			9.8	0.3	1.1	0.5	3.9	7.8	–	1.0	29.2	0.2	7.1
Apr 2023	21 Kutatóközpont	1000	44	15	–	–	–	–	–	–	6	14	–			21	29
3 Apr 2022	National Election	32,810	42.1	46.2							3.9	6.1				1.9	4.1

==== Budapest XIV. ====
Fieldwork date	Polling firm	Sample size	Fidesz–KDNP	DK	MSZP	Dialogue	MM	Jobbik	LMP	MMM	MH	MKKP	NP	2RK	TISZA	Others	Lead
12 Apr 2026	National Election	73,337	25.67	1.75	–	–	–	–	–	–	4.33	1.39	–	–	66.86	–	41.19
10–12 Dec 2025	21 Kutatóközpont	800	24	4	–	–	–	–	–	–	7	8	–	–	57	1	33
13–19 May 2025	21 Kutatóközpont	800	27	4	–	–	3	–	–	–	5	8	–	–	53	–	26
9 Jun 2024	EP Election	56,301	29.3	12.0			9.7	0.3	1.5	0.5	4.0	6.4	–	0.9	35.2	0.3	5.9
3 Apr 2022	National Election	65,939	37.3	51.6							3.7	5.6				1.9	14.4

=== Debrecen ===
Fieldwork date	Polling firm	Sample size	Fidesz–KDNP	DK	MSZP	Dialogue	MM	Jobbik	LMP	MMM	MH	MKKP	NP	2RK	TISZA	Others	Lead
12 Apr 2026	National Election	126,525	33.13	1.02	–	–	–	–	–	–	5.57	0.91	–	–	59.37	–	26.24
9 Jun 2024	EP Election	85,322	40.7	6.2			3.3	0.4	0.8	0.5	6.3	3.4	–	0.7	37.5	0.3	3.2
13–18 Oct 2023	21 Kutatóközpont	1,000	41	13	1	1	13	2	1	2	10	10	2	2		–	28
28 Jan–1 Feb 2023	21 Kutatóközpont	1,000	43	13	2	–	11	7	3	–	11	7	–			3	30
3 Apr 2022	National Election	111,880	50.8	37.3							6.1	3.7				2.1	13.5

=== Győr ===
Fieldwork date	Polling firm	Sample size	Fidesz–KDNP	DK	MSZP	Dialogue	MM	Jobbik	LMP	MMM	MH	MKKP	NP	2RK	TISZA	Others	Lead
12 Apr 2026	National Election	79,785	33.17	1.18	–	–	–	–	–	–	5.26	0.82	–	–	59.57	–	26.4
25–31 Mar 2025	21 Kutatóközpont	800	36	3	–	–	3	–	–	–	5	6	–	–	47	–	11
9 Jun 2024	EP Election	59,298	40.6	7.0			3.2	0.7	1.5	0.5	5.2	3.3	–	0.7	36.9	0.4	3.7
3 Apr 2022	National Election	71,295	50.2	37.5							5.8	3.6				2.9	12.7

== Diaspora polling ==
This section includes poll results conducted in particular outside of Hungary.

Country/area	Fieldwork date	Polling firm	Sample size	Fidesz–KDNP	DK	MSZP	Dialogue	MM	Jobbik	LMP	MMM	MH	MKKP	NP	2RK	TISZA	Others	Lead
Diaspora	12 Apr 2026	National Election	335,595	84.2	0.2	–	–	–	–	–	–	1.5	0.4	–	–	13.8	–	70.4
Romania (Cluj-Napoca)	6–22 Nov 2025	SoDiSo Research	1,225	>90	<10	<10	<10	<10	<10	<10	<10	<10	<10	<10	<10	<10	<10	80<
Romania (Cluj-Napoca)	May–Jun 2025	SoDiSo Research (Note: This poll could not be independently verified.)	–	96.0	<1.0	<1.0	<1.0	<1.0	<1.0	<1.0	<1.0	1.7	<1.0	<1.0	<1.0	1.4	<1.0	94.3
Diaspora	9 Jun 2024	EP Election	59,290	90.0	0.8			0.9	0.2	0.3	0.2	2.0	1.0	–	0.1	4.4	0.1	85.6
Diaspora	3 Apr 2022	National Election	268,766	93.9	4.1							1.6	0.6				0.3	89.8

== Electoral district polling ==
This section includes poll results conducted in particular constituencies. Due to the boundaries of some constituencies changing, the results do not include the previous elections in some places as, where they have been changed, they are not comparable.

=== Bács-Kiskun OEVK 3 ===
Fieldwork date	Polling firm	Sample size	Fidesz–KDNP	DK	MSZP	Dialogue	MM	Jobbik	LMP	MMM	MH	MKKP	NP	2RK	TISZA	Others	Lead
12 Apr 2026	National Election	49,422	40.52	1.39	–	–	–	–	–	–	6.23	0.56	–	–	51.30	–	10.78
Jul 2025	Fidesz internal poll	500	47.7	2.6	0.6	0.3	–	2.2	–	–	8.3	1.4	–	–	36.4	0.6	11.3
9 Jun 2024	EP Election	36,064	50.4	7.4			1.9	1.1	0.4	0.4	7.6	2.4	–	0.5	27.2	0.6	23.2
3 Apr 2022	National Election	44,540	58.4	30.0							6.4	2.3				1.9	28.4

=== Bács-Kiskun OEVK 6 ===
Fieldwork date	Polling firm	Sample size	Fidesz–KDNP	TISZA	DK	MH	MKKP	Others	Lead
12 Apr 2026	National Election	46,305	39.11	52.70	0.92	6.73	0.53	0	13.59
Feb 2026	Fidesz internal poll	–	48	37	2	9	2	1	11

=== Baranya OEVK 1 ===
Fieldwork date	Polling firm	Sample size	Fidesz–KDNP	DK	MSZP	Dialogue	MM	Jobbik	LMP	MMM	MH	MKKP	NP	2RK	TISZA	Others	Lead
12 Apr 2026	National Election	56,025	29.24	1.73	–	–	–	–	–	–	4.90	0.91	–	–	63.22	–	33.98
28 May–3 Jun 2025	Medián	1,000	28	5	–	–	–	1	–	–	5	5	–	–	54	2	26
9 Jun 2024	EP Election	38,430	36.6	11.7			4.8	0.7	1.0	0.7	5.4	4.5	–	0.9	33.4	0.4	3.3
3 Apr 2022	National Election	51,597	41.8	44.0							5.4	4.1				4.8	2.2

=== Békés OEVK 2 ===
Fieldwork date	Polling firm	Sample size	Fidesz–KDNP	TISZA	DK	MH	MKKP	Others	Lead
12 Apr 2026	National Election	50,540	39.93	51.39	0.91	6.85	0.56	–	11.46
19–20 Jan 2026	21 Kutatóközpont	600	42	46	2	7	2	0	4

=== Békés OEVK 3 ===
Fieldwork date	Polling firm	Sample size	Fidesz–KDNP	DK	MSZP	Dialogue	MM	Jobbik	LMP	MMM	MH	MKKP	NP	2RK	TISZA	Others	Lead
12 Apr 2026	National Election	49,483	41.14	0.74	–						5.19	0.62	–		52.19	–	11.05
14–16 Jul 2025	TISZA internal poll	–	43	4	–	–	–	–	–	–	8	–	–	–	43	1	Tie
9 Jun 2024	EP Election	37,154	49.0	6.5			2.0	1.1	0.5	0.7	7.4	2.2	–	0.6	29.6	0.4	19.4
3 Apr 2022	National Election	44,157	55.4	32.6							7.3	2.2				2.6	22.8

=== Békés OEVK 4 ===
Fieldwork date	Polling firm	Sample size	Fidesz–KDNP	TISZA	DK	MH	MKKP	Others	Lead
12 Apr 2026	National Election	50,190	35.22	54.79	0.92	6.04	–	–	19.57
20–22 Jan 2026	21 Kutatóközpont	800	41	49	1	6	1	0	8

=== Borsod-Abaúj-Zemplén OEVK 1 ===
Fieldwork date	Polling firm	Sample size	Fidesz–KDNP	TISZA	DK	MH	MKKP	Others	Lead
12 Apr 2026	National Election	54,177	31.23	60.07	2	5.35	0.59	–	28.84
11–12 Mar 2026	Závecz Research	–	46	44	7	1	–	1	2

=== Borsod-Abaúj-Zemplén OEVK 3 ===
Fieldwork date	Polling firm	Sample size	Fidesz–KDNP	TISZA	DK	MH	MKKP	Others	Lead
12 Apr 2026	National Election	49,843	46.76	45.14	0.74	5.64	0.41	–	1.62
Mar 2026	Fidesz internal poll	–	55	32	2	1	9	1	23

=== Borsod-Abaúj-Zemplén OEVK 5 ===
Fieldwork date	Polling firm	Sample size	Fidesz–KDNP	DK	MSZP	Dialogue	MM	Jobbik	LMP	MMM	MH	MKKP	NP	2RK	TISZA	Others	Lead
12 Apr 2026	National Election	50,275	43.58	0.64	–			0.23	–		4.54	0.39	–		50.29	–	6.71
Jul 2025	Fidesz internal poll	500	49.7	2.5	2.7	0.0	1.3	2.4	0.7	–	4.2	0.8	–	–	35.3	0.5	14.4
9 Jun 2024	EP Election	44,068	55.7	6.4			1.7	1.7	0.6	0.5	7.1	1.7	–	0.4	23.9	0.3	23.2
3 Apr 2022	National Election	45,106	61.0	28.8							5.7	1.7				2.8	32.2

=== Borsod-Abaúj-Zemplén OEVK 6 ===
Fieldwork date	Polling firm	Sample size	Fidesz–KDNP	TISZA	DK	MH	MKKP	Others	Lead
12 Apr 2026	National Election	55,721	41.23	51.20	0.68	4.60	–	–	9.97
Mar 2026	Fidesz internal poll	–	46	41	4	8	1	–	5
11–12 Mar 2026	21 Kutatóközpont	800	46	48	1	4	1	0	2

=== Borsod-Abaúj-Zemplén OEVK 7 ===
Fieldwork date	Polling firm	Sample size	Fidesz–KDNP	TISZA	DK	MH	MKKP	Others	Lead
12 Apr 2026	National Election	56,208	39.53	53.04	0.64	5.87	0.55	–	13.51
Feb 2026	Fidesz internal poll	–	51	39	2	6	1	1	12

=== Budapest OEVK 4 ===
Fieldwork date	Polling firm	Sample size	Fidesz–KDNP	DK	MM	MH	MKKP	TISZA	Others	Lead
12 Apr 2026	National Election	69,118	28.93	1.18	–	3.04	1.43	65.41	–	36.48
12-14 Jan 2026	Publicus	1,001	38	4	–	–	3	55	0	17
28 Mar–4 Apr 2025	Medián	800	21	2	2	2	5	66	2	45
9 Jun 2024	EP Election	N/A (Note: Due to boundary changes, results are not directly comparable.)								
3 Apr 2022	National Election	N/A								

=== Budapest OEVK 6 ===
Fieldwork date	Polling firm	Sample size	Fidesz–KDNP	DK	MSZP	Dialogue	MM	Jobbik	LMP	MH	MKKP	TISZA	Others	Lead
12 Apr 2026	National Election	63,327	24.65	–						4.46	1.15	53.62	–	28.97
25 Aug–8 Sep 2025	Medián	1,000	26	4	–	–	–	–	–	2	5	61	2	35
Jul 2025	Fidesz internal poll	500	28.9	7.8	4.1	2.2	4.7	2.7	1.7	3.0	6.4	38.0	0.4	9.1
17–21 Jul 2025	21 Kutatóközpont	800	25	4	–	–	–	–	–	4	10	57	1	32
9 Jun 2024	EP Election	N/A												
3 Apr 2022	National Election	N/A												

=== Budapest OEVK 11 ===
Fieldwork date	Polling firm	Sample size	Fidesz–KDNP	TISZA	DK	MH	MKKP	Others	Lead
12 Apr 2026	National Election	67,072	27.86	64.29	1.83	4.79	1.23	–	36.43
18 Feb–5 Mar 2026	21 Kutatóközpont	700	25	62	5	4	3	1	37
9 Jun 2024	EP Election	N/A							
3 Apr 2022	National Election	N/A							

=== Budapest OEVK 13 ===
Fieldwork date	Polling firm	Sample size	Fidesz–KDNP	TISZA	DK	MH	MKKP	Others	Lead
12 Apr 2026	National Election	63,446	27.37	61.27	4.04	5.92	1.26	–	33.9
3 Oct–6 Nov 2025	Publicus	1,002	38	48	10	1	4	0	10
9 Jun 2024	EP Election	N/A							
3 Apr 2022	National Election	N/A							

=== Budapest OEVK 14 ===
Fieldwork date	Polling firm	Sample size	Fidesz–KDNP	TISZA	DK	MH	MKKP	Others	Lead
12 Apr 2026	National Election	65,810	31.89	61.53	1.19	3.93	0.81	–	29.64
15–18 Dec 2025	21 Kutatóközpont	800	30	60	4	3	3	–	30
9 Jun 2024	EP Election	N/A							
3 Apr 2022	National Election	N/A							

=== Csongrád-Csanád OEVK 2 ===
Fieldwork date	Polling firm	Sample size	Fidesz–KDNP	TISZA	DK	MH	MKKP	Others	Lead
12 Apr 2026	National Election	59,532	32.54	55.55	0.87	10.08	0.97	–	23.01
5–9 Dec 2025	21 Kutatóközpont	600	35	52	1	9	3	0	17
9 Jun 2024	EP Election	N/A							
3 Apr 2022	National Election	N/A							

=== Heves OEVK 2 ===
Fieldwork date	Polling firm	Sample size	Fidesz–KDNP	TISZA	DK	MH	MKKP	Others	Lead
12 Apr 2026	National Election	57,487	39.64	51.65	1.02	6.05	0.58	–	11.01
Mar 2026	Fidesz internal poll	–	48	42	1	7	1	1	6

=== Jász-Nagykun-Szolnok OEVK 2 ===
Fieldwork date	Polling firm	Sample size	Fidesz–KDNP	DK	MSZP	Dialogue	MM	Jobbik	LMP	MMM	MH	MKKP	NP	2RK	TISZA	Others	Lead
12 Apr 2026	National Election	52,808	41.19	0.61	–						5.95	–			51.27	–	10.08
Mar 2026	Fidesz internal poll	–	52	5	–	–	–	–	–	–	5	1	–	–	37	–	15
11–12 Mar 2026	21 Kutatóközpont	800	46	1	–	–	–	–	–	–	5	0	–	–	48	0	2
Jul 2025	Fidesz internal poll	500	45.9	5.3	1.1	1.5	1.5	3.1	1.7	–	6.6	2.7	–	–	29.2	1.4	16.7
9 Jun 2024	EP Election	38,104	48.2	6.2			2.3	2.8	0.6	0.5	6.4	2.2	–	0.6	29.9	0.3	18.3
3 Apr 2022	National Election	47,173	59.7	30.3							6.0	2.1				1.9	29.4

=== Komárom-Esztergom OEVK 3 ===
Fieldwork date	Polling firm	Sample size	Fidesz–KDNP	TISZA	DK	MH	MKKP	Others	Lead
12 Apr 2026	National Election	64,117	39.09	53.03	0.84	6.32	0.73	–	13.94
Mar 2026	Fidesz internal poll	–	49	39	5	5	1	1	10

=== Nógrád OEVK 1 ===
Fieldwork date	Polling firm	Sample size	Fidesz–KDNP	TISZA	DK	MH	MKKP	Others	Lead
12 Apr 2026	National Election	57,487	39.42	52.71	–	7.76	0	–	13.29
Feb 2026	Fidesz internal poll	–	51	36	6	6	1	1	15

=== Pest OEVK 9 ===
Fieldwork date	Polling firm	Sample size	Fidesz–KDNP	TISZA	DK	MH	MKKP	Others	Lead
12 Apr 2026	National Election	60,817	36.72	54.15	0.97	7.23	0.73	–	17.43
Feb 2026	Fidesz internal poll	–	50	38	1	9	1	1	12

=== Pest OEVK 11 ===
Fieldwork date	Polling firm	Sample size	Fidesz–KDNP	TISZA	DK	MH	MKKP	Others	Lead
12 Apr 2026	National Election	62,343	37.57	54.13	1.19	6.28	0.84	–	16.56
Mar 2026	Fidesz internal poll	–	44	38	4	10	3	1	6

=== Pest OEVK 13 ===
Fieldwork date	Polling firm	Sample size	Fidesz–KDNP	DK	MSZP	MM	Jobbik	LMP	MH	MKKP	TISZA	Others	Lead
12 Apr 2026	National Election	54,517	38.36	0.64	–				11.18	0.59	48.93	–	10.57
Jul 2025	Fidesz internal poll	500	50.3	3.3	0.5	1.1	1.7	0.4	7.7	2.7	30.8	1.7	19.5
9 Jun 2024	EP Election	N/A											
3 Apr 2022	National Election	N/A											

=== Szabolcs-Szatmár-Bereg OEVK 1 ===
Fieldwork date	Polling firm	Sample size	Fidesz–KDNP	DK	MSZP	Dialogue	MM	Jobbik	LMP	MMM	MH	MKKP	NP	2RK	TISZA	Others	Lead
12 Apr 2026	National Election	58,190	29.67	0.80	–						4.31	0.45	–		64.77	–	35.1
Dec 2025	21 Kutatóközpont	800	27	5	–	–	–	–	–	–	6	2	–	–	58	2	31
9 Jun 2024	EP Election	40,142	36.8	9.9			2.6	0.6	0.7	0.6	6.1	2.6	–	0.6	39.4	0.3	2.6
3 Apr 2022	National Election	51,772	44.9	42.1							5.3	2.1				5.6	2.8

=== Szabolcs-Szatmár-Bereg OEVK 3 ===
Fieldwork date	Polling firm	Sample size	Fidesz–KDNP	TISZA	DK	MH	MKKP	Others	Lead
12 Apr 2026	National Election	55,765	43.91	50.31	0.8	4.49	–	–	6.4
Feb 2026	Fidesz internal poll	–	59	30	2	4	1	2	29

=== Szabolcs-Szatmár-Bereg OEVK 5 ===
Fieldwork date	Polling firm	Sample size	Fidesz–KDNP	DK	MSZP	Dialogue	MM	Jobbik	LMP	MMM	MH	MKKP	NP	2RK	TISZA	Others	Lead
12 Apr 2026	National Election	51,163	49.66	0.62	–						6.38	–			43.14	–	6.52
Jul 2025	Fidesz internal poll	500	47.7	3.5	1.0	0.1	0.6	2.0	0.1	–	5.3	0.7	–	–	38.5	0.5	9.2
9 Jun 2024	EP Election	42,417	62.1	5.2			0.7	1.5	0.4	0.4	6.8	1.1	–	0.3	21.0	0.3	41.1
3 Apr 2022	National Election	45,761	68.2	23.4							6.1	1.0				1.3	44.8

=== Tolna OEVK 3 ===
Fieldwork date	Polling firm	Sample size	Fidesz–KDNP	TISZA	DK	MH	MKKP	Others	Lead
12 Apr 2026	National Election	44,032	45.39	47.42	0.94	6.05	–	–	3.03
Mar 2026	Fidesz internal poll	–	55	37	2	5	1	–	25

=== Vas OEVK 1 ===
Fieldwork date	Polling firm	Sample size	Fidesz–KDNP	DK	MSZP	Dialogue	MM	Jobbik	LMP	MMM	MH	MKKP	NP	2RK	TISZA	Others	Lead
12 Apr 2026	National Election	56,548	38.12	–							4.69	0.87	–		56.42	–	18.3
30 Jan–2 Feb 2026	21 Kutatóközpont	800	40	2	–	–	–	–	–	–	2	3	–	–	53	0	13
8–11 Dec 2025	Publicus	1,000	41	8	0	0	0	0	0	0	4	0	–	–	47	0	6
1–5 Sep 2025	Publicus	1,001	39	8	1	0	0	0	0	0	3	1	–	–	48	0	9
9 Jun 2024	EP Election	43,421	42.3	10.3			3.6	0.7	1.1	0.6	4.8	3.3	–	0.6	32.3	0.4	10.0
3 Apr 2022	National Election	51,637	52.2	37.4							4.7	3.5				2.2	14.8

=== Vas OEVK 2 ===
Fieldwork date	Polling firm	Sample size	Fidesz–KDNP	TISZA	DK	MH	MKKP	Others	Lead
12 Apr 2026	National Election	55,570	46.25	45.80	0.79	5.52	–	–	0.45
Mar 2026	Fidesz internal poll	–	57	33	2	2	2	2	24

=== Vas OEVK 3 ===
Fieldwork date	Polling firm	Sample size	Fidesz–KDNP	TISZA	DK	MH	MKKP	Others	Lead
12 Apr 2026	National Election	53,216	49.21	43.64	0.79	6.05	–	–	5.57
Mar 2026	Fidesz internal poll	–	56	31	2	7	1	2	25

=== Veszprém OEVK 3 ===
Fieldwork date	Polling firm	Sample size	Fidesz–KDNP	TISZA	DK	Jobbik	MH	MKKP	Others	Lead
12 Apr 2026	National Election	52,262	39.7	54	1.02	0.15	4.58	0	–	14.3
Feb 2026	Fidesz internal poll	–	46	36	4	1	9	1	2	10

=== Veszprém OEVK 4 ===
Fieldwork date	Polling firm	Sample size	Fidesz–KDNP	TISZA	DK	MH	MKKP	Others	Lead
12 Apr 2026	National Election	52,394	43.67	48.58	1.29	5.78	0.53	–	4.91
Feb 2026	Fidesz internal poll	–	56	31	5	5	2	1	25

== Prime Minister polling ==
=== Hungary ===
The following table outlines the preferred Prime Minister amongst Hungarians.

Fieldwork date	Polling firm	Sample size	Orbán	Dobrev	Donáth	Márki-Zay	Toroczkai	Magyar	Others/Don't Know	Lead
5–10 Apr 2026	AtlasIntel	1,587	40.8	2.3	–	–	3.8	48.7	4.4	7.9
23–26 Mar 2026	Republikon	1,000	38	–	–	–	–	41	21	3
12–17 Feb 2026	Republikon	1,000	37	–	–	–	–	45	18	8
26–27 Jan 2026	Nézőpont	1,000	46	4	–	–	4	35	11	11
24–26 Nov 2025	Nézőpont	1,000	47	4	–	–	5	32	12	15
20–22 Oct 2025	Nézőpont	1,000	45	3	–	–	5	34	13	11
10–14 Sep 2025	McLaughlin & Associates	1,000	45	–	–	–	–	36	19	9
27–31 Aug 2025	21 Kutatóközpont	1,000	30	–	–	–	–	36	33	6
Jul 2025	Századvég	1,000	41	7	–	–	5	34	13	7
1–7 Apr 2025	21 Kutatóközpont	1,000	33	–	–	–	–	37	30	4
10–12 Mar 2025	Nézőpont	1,000	46	7 (Note: Did not serve as party leader when the poll took place.)	–	–	5	28	14	18
15–17 Jul 2024	Nézőpont	1,000	49	7	–	–	4	19	20	30
27–29 Mar 2023	Alapjogokért Központ	1,000	58	–	–	18	–	–	24	40
13–15 Feb 2023	Nézőpont	1,000	49	13	6	–	7	–	25	36

=== Diaspora ===
The following table outlines the preferred Prime Minister among the Hungarian diaspora.

Country/area	Fieldwork date	Polling firm	Sample size	Orbán	Magyar	Others/Don't Know	Lead
Romania (Cluj-Napoca)	6–22 Nov 2025	SoDiSo Research	1,225	±90	±10	±10	±80
Romania (Cluj-Napoca)	May–Jun 2025	SoDiSo Research	–	89.0	4.9	6.1	84.1

=== Suitability as Prime Minister ===
The following table outlines the perceived suitability of party leaders to be Prime Minister.

==== Viktor Orbán ====
Fieldwork date	Polling firm	Sample size	Orbán			
Fieldwork date	Polling firm	Sample size	check	X mark	Question	Net
5–10 Apr 2026	AtlasIntel	1,587	42.5	56.9	0.6	−14.4
17–20 Mar 2026	Medián	1,000	45	53	2	−8
18–23 Feb 2026	Medián	1,000	46	52	2	−6
Jan 2026	Publicus	–	42	55	3	−13
7–13 Jan 2026	Medián	1,000	46	52	2	−8
20–25 Nov 2025	Medián	1,000	48	49	3	−1
28 Aug–4 Sep 2025	Medián	1,000	45	54	1	−9
3–7 Jun 2025	Medián	1,000	44	53	3	−9
31 May–5 Jun 2024	Medián	1,000	52	44	4	+8

==== Klára Dobrev ====
Fieldwork date	Polling firm	Sample size	Dobrev			
Fieldwork date	Polling firm	Sample size	check	X mark	Question	Net
28 Aug–4 Sep 2025	Medián	1,000	25	71	4	−46
3–7 Jun 2025	Medián	1,000	26	67	7	−41
31 May–5 Jun 2024	Medián	1,000	21	69	10	−48

==== Péter Magyar ====
Fieldwork date	Polling firm	Sample size	Magyar			
Fieldwork date	Polling firm	Sample size	check	X mark	Question	Net
17–20 March 2026	Medián	1,000	54	41	5	+7
18–23 Feb 2026	Medián	1,000	50	45	5	+5
7–13 Jan 2026	Medián	1,000	54	41	5	+7
20–25 Nov 2025	Medián	1,000	48	46	6	+2
28 Aug–4 Sep 2025	Medián	1,000	52	45	3	+7
3–7 Jun 2025	Medián	1,000	53	43	4	+10
31 May–5 Jun 2024	Medián	1,000	34	55	11	−21

=== Viktor Orbán's further possible premiership ===
The following table outlines Orbán's position after the next election.

Fieldwork date	Polling firm	Sample size	Would you like Viktor Orbán to continue as Prime Minister for another 4 years?			
Fieldwork date	Polling firm	Sample size	check	X mark	Question	Net
Fieldwork date	Polling firm	Sample size	Yes	No	Question	Net
20–25 Feb 2026	Minerva	1,000	37.1	44.6	18.3	−7.5
19–22 Jan 2026	Minerva	1,000	37.2	42.5	20.3	−5.3
8–12 Dec 2025	Minerva	1,000	37.0	41.6	21.3	−4.6
10–17 Nov 2025	Minerva	1,000	41.4	38.6	20.0	+2.8

=== Viktor Orbán's possible party successor as Prime Minister ===
The following table outlines which current or former Fidesz politician would be the most suitable successor to Orbán as Prime Minister.

Fieldwork date	Polling firm	Sample size	Áder	Lázár	Szijjártó	J. Varga	M. Varga	Others/Don't Know
Jan 2026	Publicus	–	6	9	17	3	12	53

== See also ==
- Opinion polling for the 2022 Hungarian parliamentary election
- Opinion polling for the 2030 Hungarian parliamentary election
