= Opinion polling for the 2030 Hungarian parliamentary election =

In the run-up to the 2030 Hungarian parliamentary election, various organizations are carrying out opinion polling to gauge voting intention in Hungary. The results of such polls are displayed in this article.

== Pollster bias ==
The following table displays the pollsters in alphabetical order which have alleged funding and/or links to political parties:

Pollster	Alleged bias or conflict of interest	Source(s)
21 Kutatóközpont	Its founder and director previously worked for Momentum, as advisor to mayors László Botka or Gergely Karácsony, and the pollster is close to the newspaper 24.hu.	
XXI. Század Intézet	Strong links to Fidesz, its director is Mária Schmidt, a former advisor of Viktor Orbán, and its board includes former MEP József Szájer.	
Alapjogokért Központ	Strong links to Fidesz, and received government funding during the Orbán era.	
Forrás Társadalomkutató	Its founders were members of the campaign staff for EM in 2022.	
IDEA Institute	One of the key staff members is an advisor to DK.	
Iránytű Institute	Receives funding from Jobbik, and the party is reportedly the company's only client.	
Magyar Társadalomkutató	Strong links to Fidesz.	
McLaughlin & Associates	The company has been described as "Donald Trump's pollster" and is close to the Fidesz ally newspaper Index.hu.	
Medián	The company's owner was formerly an SZDSZ member, and is close to the newspaper HVG.	
Nézőpont Institute	Strong links to Fidesz, and received government funding during the Orbán era.	
Publicus Institute	Close relationship with MSZP, and the pollster is close to the leftist newspaper Népszava.	
Real-PR 93	Strong links to Fidesz.	
Republikon Institute	Identifies as a liberal pollster, and its founder is a former SZDSZ politician.	
SoDiSo Research	The company is the pollster of UDMR/RMDSZ and is close to the Fidesz ally newspaper Magyar Nemzet.	
Századvég	Strong links to Fidesz. During the Orbán era, it received at least 65 billion forints (€180 million) of government funding through classified decisions.	
Závecz Research	Unproven association with DK.	

== Polling ==

The following table outlines the results of polls where voters where asked how they would vote in the upcoming election. The numbers correspond to the percentage of party voters saying they will vote for a particular party; as such, undecided responses are removed. Poll results are listed in the tables below in reverse chronological order, showing the most recent first, and using the date the survey's fieldwork was done, as opposed to the date of publication. If such date is unknown, the date of publication is given instead. The highest percentage figure in each polling survey is displayed in bold, and the background shaded in the leading party's colour. Any party which was not polled is displayed with an en-dash (–). Other parties in bold are expected to pass the threshold (5% for one party, 10% for a joint list of two parties, and 15% for a joint list of three or more parties) to be represented in the National Assembly. As polling is only done among Hungarian residents, but the threshold is calculated based on all list votes, parties may need a larger share of the domestic vote share when considering diaspora voters, who previously have voted in large margins for Fidesz–KDNP.

=== 2026 ===
Fieldwork date	Polling firm	Sample size	Method	TISZA	Fidesz–KDNP	MH	DK	MKKP	Others	Lead
13 Nov 2026	Europion	2,528	Online	59	27	**10**	–	–	4	32
10–13 Nov 2026	Nézőpont	1,000	Phone	62	27	**9**	–	–	2	35
5–12 Nov 2026	21 Kutatóközpont	1,000	Phone	68	24	**6**	–	–	2	44
29 Oct – 4 Nov 2026	Medián	1,000	Phone	68	20	**11**	–	–	1	48
28 Oct – 2 Nov 2026	Republikon	1,000	Phone	63	26	**8**	–	–	3	37
14–15 Oct 2026	Europion	2,032	Online	61	26	**9**	–	–	3	35
13–16 Oct 2026	Nézőpont	1,000	Phone	58	27	**11**	–	–	3	31
8–16 Oct 2026	Publicus	1,006	Phone	63	25	**7**	1	2	1	38
7–18 Oct 2026	Závecz Research	1,000	Phone + Online	66	23	**9**	–	–	2	43
28–30 Sep 2026	21 Kutatóközpont	1,000	Phone	62	26	**10**	–	–	2	36
23–28 Sep 2026	Republikon	1,000	Phone	64	25	**7**	–	–	4	39
14–18 Sep 2026	Medián	1,000	Phone	64	27	**8**	–	–	1	37
7–8 Sep 2026	Europion	2,100	Online	59	27	**10**	–	–	5	32
26 Aug – 1 Sep 2026	Republikon	1,000	Phone	68	22	**7**	1	1	–	46
18–25 Aug 2026	Publicus	1,006	Phone	65	24	**7**	2	2	1	41
11 Aug 2026	Europion	1,700	Online	61	25	**10**	–	–	4	36
22–27 Jul 2026	Republikon	1,000	Phone	69	23	**6**	1	1	–	46
22–24 Jul 2026	Medián	1,000	Phone	68	23	**7**	–	1	1	45
16–21 Jul 2026	Publicus	1,002	Phone	68	23	**6**	2	1	0	45
13–20 Jul 2026	Závecz Research	1,000	Online + Phone	74	19	**6**	1	0	–	55
10–12 Jul 2026	Europion	2,400	Online	64	25	**8**	–	–	3	39
26 Jun – 1 Jul 2026	Republikon	1,000	Phone	68	24	**6**	1	1	–	44
23 Jun – 1 Jul 2026	21 Kutatóközpont	1,500	Online + Phone	67	23	**7**	–	–	3	44
22–29 Jun 2026	Medián	1,000	Phone	73	21	4	1	–	1	52
12–17 Jun 2026	IDEA	1,000	Online	68	24	**5**	2	–	1	44
6–8 Jun 2026	Europion	2,200	Online	63	28	**6**	–	–	2	35
27 May – 3 Jun 2026	Závecz Research	1,000	Online + Phone	73	20	**5**	1	1	–	53
5–14 May 2026	Publicus	1,001	Phone	73	20	**5**	1	1	–	53
9–13 May 2026	21 Kutatóközpont	1,000	Phone	71	21	**6**	1	1	–	50
9–13 May 2026	Péter Magyar takes office as Prime Minister and forms his government									
8–13 May 2026	Republikon	1,000	Phone	66	26	**6**	1	1	–	40
8–11 May 2026	IDEA	1,000	Online	68	25	**5**	1	–	1	43
8–9 May 2026	Europion	2,000	Online	64	27	**7**	–	–	3	37
27 Apr – 2 May 2026	Medián	1,000	Phone	70	23	**6**	1	–	0	47
15–20 Apr 2026	Medián	1,000	Phone	66	25	**6**	2	1	0	41
**12 Apr 2026**	**National Election**	**6,404,403**		55.76	36.33	**5.90**	**1.16**	**0.85**	**0**	**19.43**

== Preferred prime minister ==
=== Suitability as Prime Minister ===
The following table outlines the perceived suitability of party leaders to be Prime Minister.

==== Péter Magyar ====
Fieldwork date	Polling firm	Sample size	Method	Magyar			
Fieldwork date	Polling firm	Sample size	Method	check	X mark	Question	Net
8–16 Oct 2026	Publicus	1,006	Phone	56	34	–	+22
18 and 25 August 2026	Publicus	1,006	Phone	57	34	–	+23
16–21 Jul 2026	Publicus	1,002	Phone	62	30	–	+32
5–14 May 2026	Publicus	1,000	Phone	72	21	–	+51
27 Apr–2 May 2026	Medián	1,000	Phone	72	23	5	+49
15–20 Apr 2026	Medián	1,000	Phone	74	22	4	+52

==== Viktor Orbán ====
Fieldwork date	Polling firm	Sample size	Method	Orbán			
Fieldwork date	Polling firm	Sample size	Method	check	X mark	Question	Net
8–16 Oct 2026	Publicus	1,006	Phone	36	59	–	-23
18 and 25 August 2026	Publicus	1,006	Phone	33	61	–	-28
16–21 Jul 2026	Publicus	1,002	Phone	29	65	–	-36
15 Jun 2026	Parliament adopts amendment to Fundamental Law which prevents Viktor Orbán from ever being PM again.						
5–14 May 2026	Publicus	1,001	Phone	27	69	–	−42
27 Apr–2 May 2026	Medián	1,000	Phone	39	59	2	−20
15–20 Apr 2026	Medián	1,000	Phone	42	55	3	−13

== See also ==
- Opinion polling for the 2026 Hungarian parliamentary election
