= 2030 Hungarian parliamentary election =

- April or May 2030

All 199 seats in the National Assembly 100 seats needed for a majority
- Opinion polls
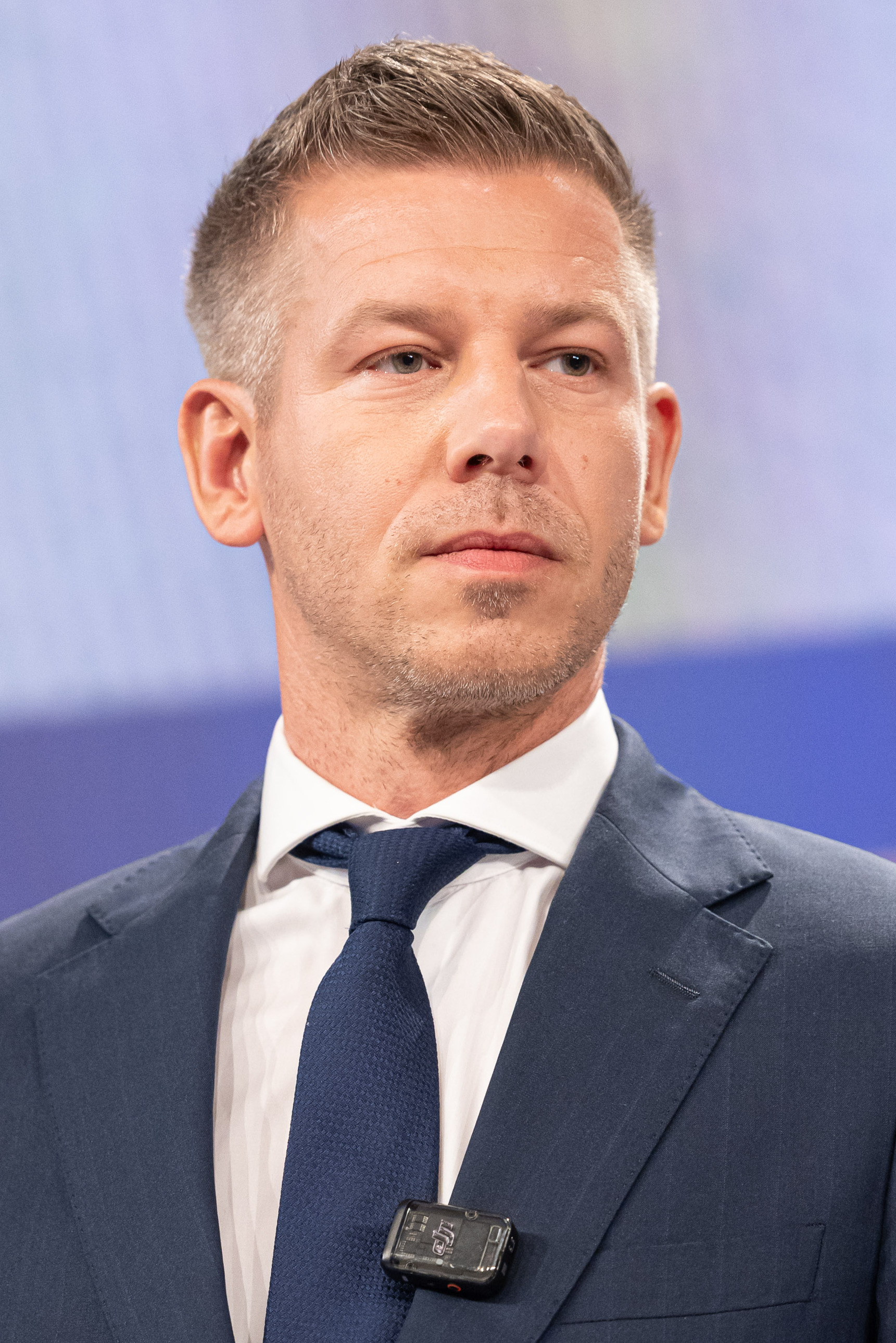

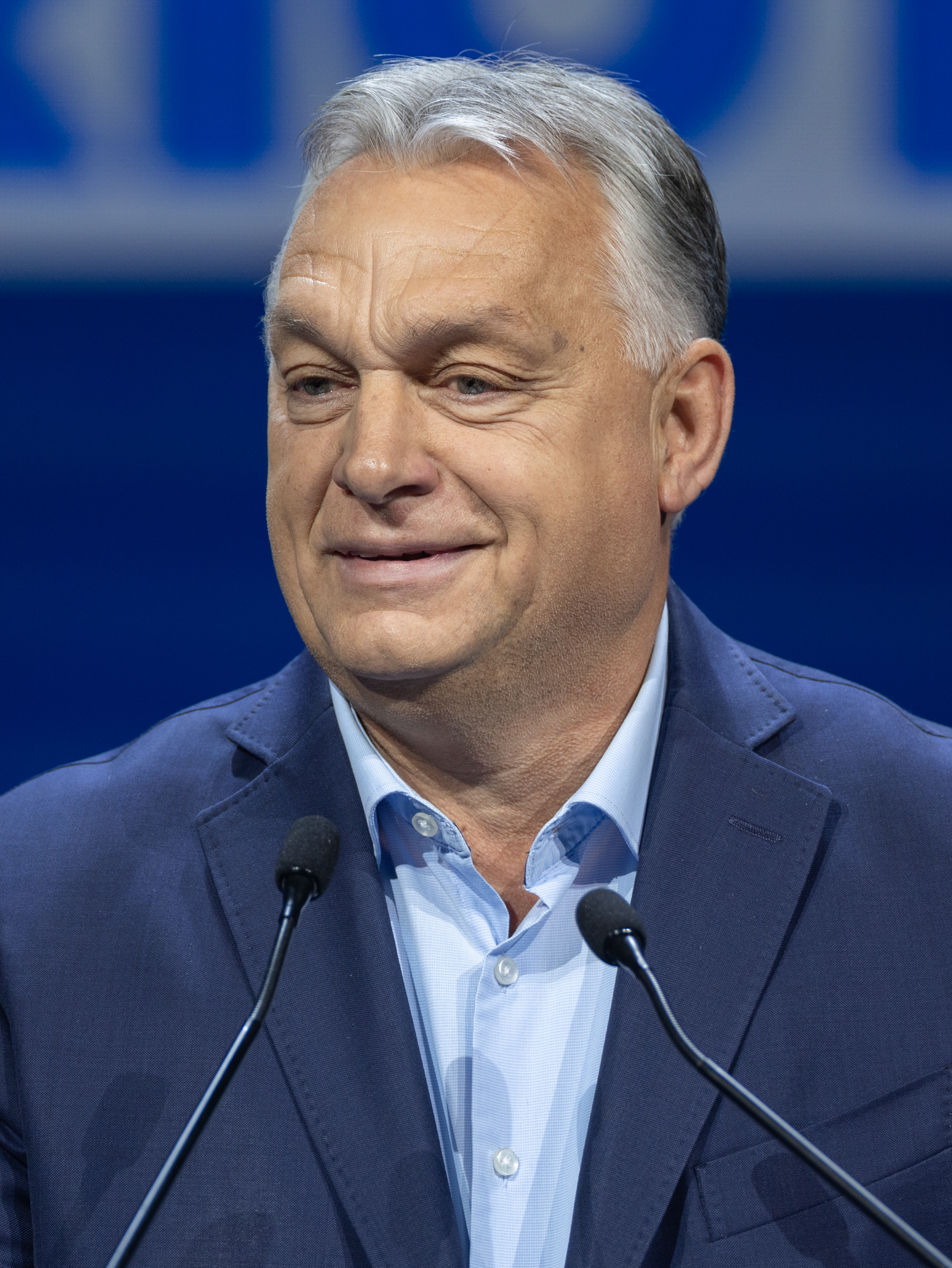

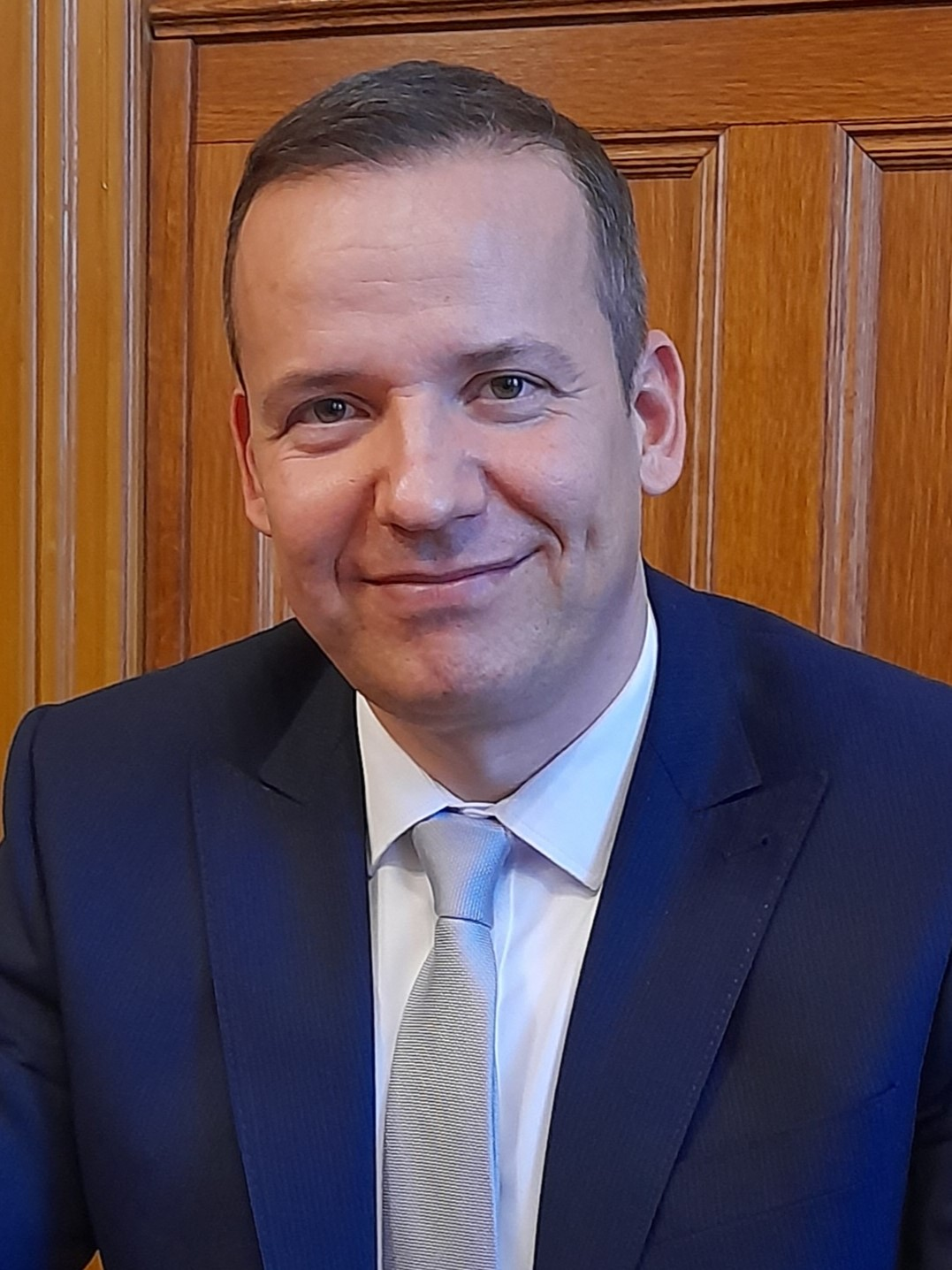
Leader	Péter Magyar	Viktor Orbán (Note: Orbán is currently prohibited from returning to the prime ministry due to his prior tenure exceeding the two-term limit established by the sixteenth amendment to the Fundamental Law of Hungary in 2026. However, he remains the leader of Fidesz. Fidesz's parliamentary leader János Bóka has said that if Fidesz wins and is given the mandate to change these rules, this would “open up further possibilities” for Orbán's return.)	László Toroczkai
Party	TISZA	Fidesz	MH
Alliance		Fidesz–KDNP
Leader since	22 July 2024	17 May 2003 (Note: As Fidesz leader.)	23 June 2018
Last election	53.2%, 141 seats	38.6%, 52 seats	5.6%, 6 seats
Incumbent Cabinet
Magyar Government
TISZA

The next Hungarian parliamentary election is scheduled to be held in April or May 2030. All 199 members of the National Assembly will be elected.

== Background ==
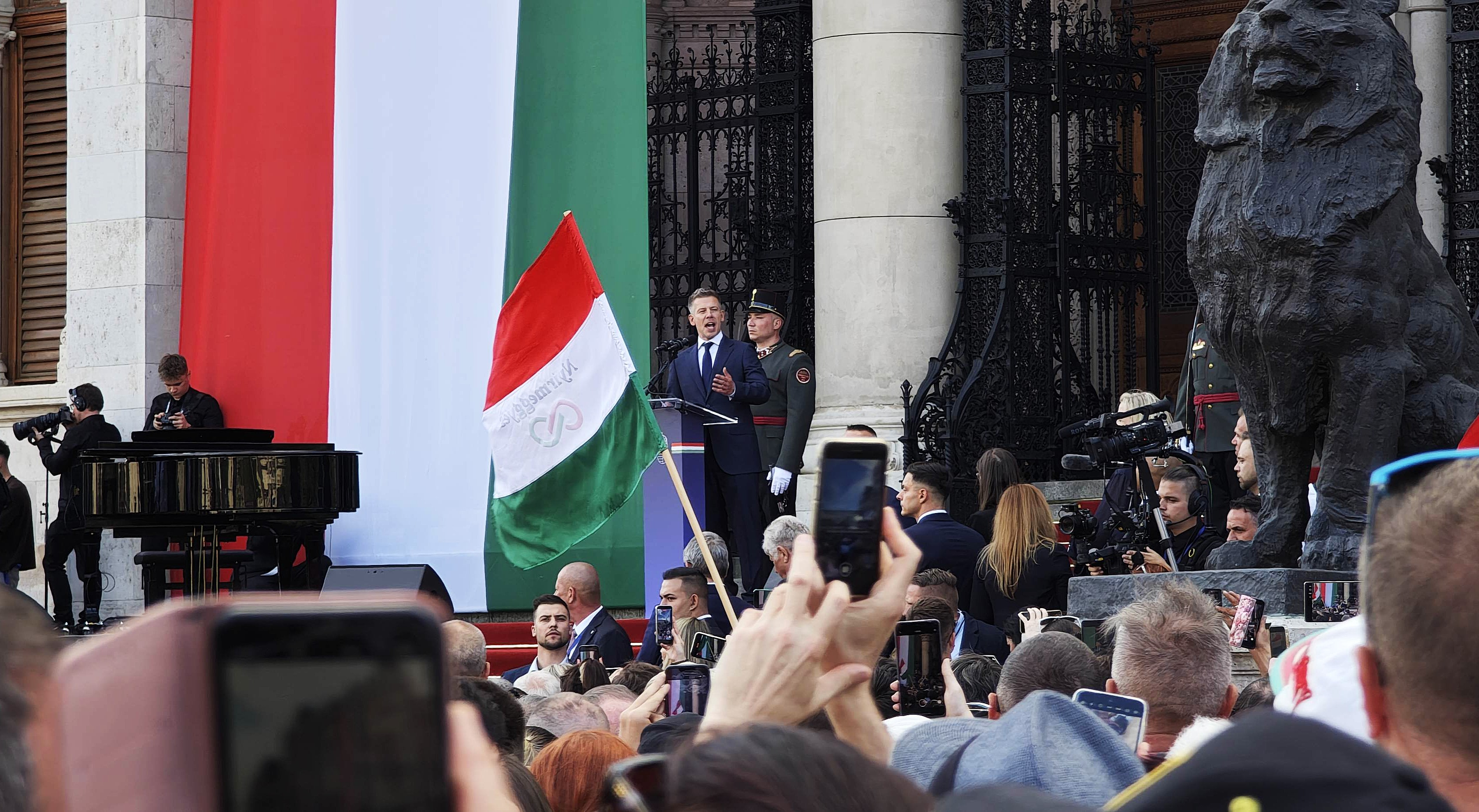
Magyar's first public speech as Prime Minister in the Kossuth Square on 9 May 2026

The 2026 Hungarian election resulted in a landslide victory for the Tisza Party, led by Péter Magyar, with it winning 141 of the 199 seats in the legislature, enough to amend the Constitution of Hungary. Magyar was subsequently tasked with forming a government to be appointed on 9 May. The Fidesz–KDNP alliance was reduced to 52 seats, while Our Homeland Movement remained at 6 seats. All the other opposition parties failed to win any seats; having either stood down in favor of Tisza, or gotten well below the 5% electoral threshold required to win seats.

On 25 April 2026, Viktor Orbán and Zsolt Semjén announced they would not take up their seats in parliament, and instead have Gergely Gulyás and Bence Rétvári serve as group leader of Fidesz and Christian Democratic People's Party.

On 9 May 2026, the inaugural session of the National Assembly was held, and Magyar took office as Prime Minister of Hungary. The Magyar Government was officially sworn three days later and start to work on the next day.

In June, the Parliament adopted the sixteenth amendment to the constitution, which limits the prime minister's time in office to two four-year terms, in line with Magyar's election campaign promises. This clause bars Orbán from becoming prime minister again, as he has served for twenty years. Fidesz's parliamentary leader János Bóka has said that if Fidesz wins and is given the mandate to change these rules, this would “open up further possibilities” for Orbán's return.

== Electoral system ==
The 199 members of the National Assembly are elected by mixed-member majoritarian representation; 106 elected in single-member constituencies by first-past-the-post voting, while the other 93 elected from nationwide party lists by modified proportional representation. The electoral threshold is set at 5% for single party lists, 10% for joint lists of two parties and 15% for joint lists of three or more parties. Since 2014, each of the Armenian, Bulgarian, Croatian, German, Greek, Polish, Romani, Romanian, Rusyn, Serbian, Slovak, Slovenian, and Ukrainian ethnic minorities can win one of the 93 party lists seats if they register as a specific list and reach a lowered quota of $\frac{1}{4 \times 93}=\frac{1}{372}$ of the sum of party list votes and unused constituency votes of parties passing the electoral threshold, together with the votes cast for national minority lists. Each minority is able to send a minority spokesman – without the rights of an MP – to the National Assembly, if the list does not reach this lowered quota. Fractional votes, calculated as all the votes of individual candidates not elected (but associated with a party list over the threshold), as well as surplus votes cast for successful candidates (margin of victory minus 1 vote), are added to the direct lists votes of the respective parties or alliances. Seats are then allocated using the D'Hondt method.

== Parties in Parliament ==
Party/Coalition Full name		Ideology	Leader(s)	2026 result		Current seats	Status
Party/Coalition Full name		Ideology	Leader(s)	% Vote	Seats	Current seats	Status
TISZA; Respect and Freedom Party		Conservatism; Populism; Pro-Europeanism	Péter Magyar	53.18	141 / 199	141 / 199	Government
Fidesz–KDNP	Fidesz; Fidesz – Hungarian Civic Alliance	Christian nationalism Illiberalism; Authoritarianism	Viktor Orbán	38.61	52 / 199	44 / 199	Opposition
Fidesz–KDNP	KDNP; Christian Democratic People's Party	Christian right	Zsolt Semjén	38.61	52 / 199	8 / 199	Opposition
MH; Our Homeland Movement		Ultranationalism; Neo-fascism; Hard Euroscepticism	László Toroczkai	5.63	6 / 199	6 / 199	Opposition
