= Zoltán Varga (investor) =

Hungarian businessman

- Born: 1967 (age 58–59); Hungary
- Education: University of Pécs
- Occupations: Businessman, investor, publisher
- Known for: Founder and owner of Central Group, one of Hungary’s largest independent media companies

Zoltán Varga (born in 1967) is a Hungarian businessman, investor, and publisher. He is the founder and owner of Central Group, one of Hungary's largest independent media companies, and one of the country's most prominent private investors.

== Career ==
Varga graduated from the Faculty of Business and Economics at the University of Pécs. During his studies, he worked for Dresdner Bank and the Frankfurt Stock Exchange. He began his professional career at the Budapest Stock Exchange in 1990. In 1991, he joined Credit Suisse First Boston (CSFB), working in their London and New York offices.

In 2004, Varga founded Central Group (Central Csoport), initially focusing on factoring, receivables, and property management, along with financial consulting. The company later expanded into venture capital fund management and private equity investments in 2007.

In 2014, Varga acquired Central Médiacsoport Zrt., one of Hungary's largest independent media companies. The group controls 19 news portals, including 24.hu, and 25 print publications, such as Nők Lapja as well as Hungarian editions of Marie Claire and National Geographic.

Varga has also invested in Poland. In 2018, he acquired Wydawnictwa Szkolne i Pedagogiczne (WSiP), a Polish educational publisher, which he later sold to a Dutch investor. Since 2023, he has been the co-owner of Gremi Media, the publisher of two prominent Polish business newspapers: Rzeczpospolita and Parkiet.

== Conflict with Hungarian government ==
Varga has been in conflict with the Hungarian government led by Prime Minister Viktor Orbán's, who – as he claims – has targeted him and his media holdings. Varga has repeatedly accused the government of pressuring him to sell his media assets and of using various intimidation tactics.

In 2021, it was revealed that Varga's telephone number was on a list of potential targets for surveillance of the Pegasus spyware. Varga has testified on that issue at the European Parliament.

In 2023, Varga faced a criminal investigation by Hungarian tax authorities, which he claimed was politically motivated. He has described this as an escalation of the government's campaign against independent media in the country.

== Philanthropy ==
Varga is involved in various philanthropic activities. He has established a mathematics foundation in his hometown of Bonyhád and supports organizations such as Bátor Tábor and Mosoly Alapítvány. He is also a significant private supporter of the Budapest Festival Orchestra.
