= Second Reform Era Party =

Hungarian political party

Second Reform Era Party Második Reformkor Párt
- Abbreviation: 2RK
- President: Gábor Vona
- Spokesperson: Árpád Burány
- Vice Presidents: Emese Pekárné Farkas; Árpád Burány; Vanda Laura Nánási
- Party Director: József Dakó
- Policy Director: Levente Szabó
- Chair of the National Council: Viktor Póka
- Founder: Gábor Vona
- Founded: 9 September 2023; 3 years ago
- Headquarters: 1047 Budapest, Labdarúgó utca 34.
- Youth wing: Szintézis
- Ideology: Neohumanism; Centrism; Reformism; Anti-populism; Anti-corruption; Patriotism
- Political position: Centre
- Colours: Gold; Black
- Slogan: Élni és élni hagyni ('Live and let live'); Adjuk vissza az országot a fiataloknak ('Give the country back to young people')
- National Assembly: 0 / 199
- European Parliament: 0 / 21
- County Assemblies: 0 / 381
- General Assembly of Budapest: 0 / 33

Website
- www.2rk.hu

The Second Reform Era Party (Hungarian: Második Reformkor Párt; also known as the Second Reform Era, 2RK or 2RK Party) is a Hungarian centrist political party founded in 2023 and led since its formation by Gábor Vona, a former president of Jobbik.

== Background ==
Following the 2018 Hungarian parliamentary election, in which Fidesz won a decisive victory, Gábor Vona resigned as president of Jobbik in accordance with an earlier pledge. He also declined to take up his seat in the National Assembly and left Jobbik in 2019. During his subsequent period outside party politics, he appeared in the media as a political commentator and maintained a YouTube channel focusing mainly on social issues.

In 2019, Vona founded the Second Reform Era Foundation, which brought together people interested in public affairs and later served as the precursor to the party. Among its initiatives were proposals for a day commemorating Roma heroes, greater involvement of non-party civil organisations in local government, and online votes on public policy questions.

== Formation ==
Vona considered the foundation's organisational form insufficient for pursuing his political objectives and announced the creation of the Second Reform Era Party on 7 September 2023, becoming its president. At its launch, the party stated that it did not wish to identify with a particular political camp or a fixed ideology.

The party's founding declaration identified the search for broad common causes, constructive debate and public action, national development, and environmental protection as central principles.

== Ideology and political position ==
The party describes its political outlook as reform-era thinking (reformkoriság), emphasising cooperation across political divisions, civic development and long-term policymaking. Its 2026 statement of principles advocates what it calls new humanism and explicitly identifies this approach as centrist. Its programme also discusses reform of political institutions, anti-corruption measures and national solidarity.

== Organisation ==
=== Leadership ===
==== Presidents ====
Presidents of the Second Reform Era Party
Name	Term began	Term ended	Source
Gábor Vona	September 2023	14 September 2024	
Gábor Vona	14 September 2024	13 September 2026	
Gábor Vona	13 September 2026	Incumbent	

==== Vice presidents ====
Vice presidents of the Second Reform Era Party
Name	Term began	Term ended	Source
Bence Farkas	September 2023	14 September 2024	
Miklós Orbán	September 2023	14 September 2024	
Emese Pekárné Farkas	September 2023	14 September 2024	
Emese Pekárné Farkas	14 September 2024	13 September 2026	
Emese Pekárné Farkas	13 September 2026	Incumbent	
Andrásné Szilvási	September 2023	14 September 2024	
Balázs Szőke	September 2023	14 September 2024	
Tamás Tóth	September 2023	14 September 2024	
Gábor Tóth	14 September 2024	13 September 2026	
Árpád Burány	14 September 2024	13 September 2026	
Árpád Burány	13 September 2026	Incumbent	
Anna Sarokné Varga	14 September 2024	13 September 2026	
Dániel Kézdy	14 September 2024	13 September 2026	
Márk Labundy	14 September 2024	13 September 2026	
Vanda Laura Nánási	13 September 2026	Incumbent	

=== Other officials ===
The party's other officials include:

- Árpád Burány – spokesperson.
- József Dakó – party director.
- Levente Szabó – policy director.
- Adrián Száki – communications director.
- Viktor Póka – chair of the national council.

=== Youth organisation ===
Szintézis is the youth organisation of the Second Reform Era Party, established in 2023 following the formation of the party. Its establishment was announced in October 2023, alongside the expansion of the party's nationwide organisation.

The organisation aims to encourage young people's participation in public and political life and to foster dialogue between different political viewpoints. Its name refers to the concepts of thesis, antithesis and synthesis, which also feature in the organisation's self-description. According to the party, young people aged 25 or younger may join Szintézis and participate in public discussions and other political programmes.

In July 2024, Szintézis operated its own stand at the EFOTT festival near Lake Velence, alongside youth organisations affiliated with other Hungarian political parties. It also presented a booklet introducing political philosophies.

== Election results ==
=== National Assembly ===
The Second Reform Era Party did not contest the 2026 Hungarian parliamentary election. On 17 January 2026, Vona announced that the party would field neither a national list nor individual candidates, citing, among other factors, insufficient financial resources for a nationwide campaign.

Election	List leader	Votes	%	Seats	+/−	Parliamentary role
2026	—	Did not contest		0 / 199	—	Did not contest

==== Parliamentary by-elections ====
The party contested the parliamentary by-election held in the second constituency of Tolna County on 12 January 2025, following the death of member of parliament Árpád János Potápi. Its candidate, Pál Péter Ágoston, received 338 votes (1.79%) and did not win a seat.

Election	Constituency	Candidate	Votes	%	Seats
12 January 2025	Tolna County, constituency 2	Pál Péter Ágoston	338	1.79	0 / 1

=== Local elections ===
The Second Reform Era Party did not field candidates in the 2024 Hungarian local elections. In 2023, Vona explained that the party preferred local civil organisations, rather than national political parties, to play a role in municipal government.

Election	Votes	%	Seats
2024	Did not contest		0

==== Local by-elections ====
In 2025, the party fielded candidates in several local by-elections, including constituencies in Kiskunmajsa and Tiszakécske. It did not win any of the seats listed below.

Election	Municipality and constituency	Candidate	Votes	%	Seats
12 January 2025	Kiskunmajsa, constituency 5	Botond Kardos	112	33.23	0 / 1
19 January 2025	Tiszakécske, constituency 4	József Dakó	57	12.64	0 / 1
6 April 2025	Tiszakécske, constituency 2	Zoltán Bolla	121	26.08	0 / 1

=== European Parliament ===
The Second Reform Era Party first contested an election in the 2024 European Parliament election in Hungary. It collected the 20,000 supporting signatures required to register its party list. Vona headed the party list, with Emese Pekárné Farkas in second place; Vona said he would not take a seat if elected. The party received 30,961 votes (0.68%) and won no seats.

Election	List leader	Votes	%	Seats	+/−	EP Group
2024	Gábor Vona	30,961	0.68 (#9)	0 / 21	New	−
