= 24.hu =

Hungarian online newspaper

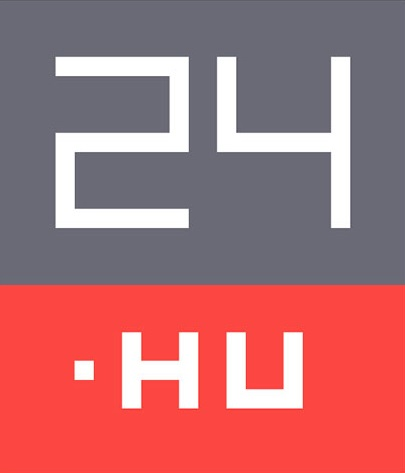
- Website type: News
- Available in: Hungarian
- Owner: Central Médiacsoport Zrt.
- Editor: Péter Pető
- Website: 24.hu
- Launched: March 2010 (as Hír24); 4 September 2015 (as 24.hu)
- Current status: Active

24.hu (formerly known as Hír24) is a Hungarian online newspaper founded in 2010. It is one of the most visited news websites in Hungary.

== History ==
In November 2000, the publisher of the weekly business newspaper Figyelő, launched an online business magazine under the name FigyelőNet, later shortened to FN.hu. In March 2010, a sister magazine called Hír24 was introduced, focusing on current affairs and politics. In September 2011, Péter Kövesdi was appointed editor-in-chief of the site. Shortly thereafter, three online magazines owned by Sanoma Budapest—FN.hu, Story Online, and Sport24—were merged into Hír24, becoming specialised sections of the site.

In June 2013, Kövesdi left the magazine. He was succeeded by Norbert Kustánczi as editor-in-chief in September. In April 2014, the Sanoma group sold the website's publisher to the Centrál Group owned by Zoltán Varga, founding the media company called Central Médiacsoport Zrt. The magazine was rebranded and renamed to 24.hu on 4 September 2015. Kustánczi was dismissed from his role in July 2017 and replaced by Péter Szigeti in October that year.

In July 2019, Péter Pető was named as the new editor-in-chief, with Szigeti becoming digital managing editor. In October 2024, the site launched its subscription-only service, 24 Extra, including exclusive articles, newsletters, and podcasts.

== Popularity ==
As of 2025, 24.hu was the third-most-visited news website in Hungary (after Telex.hu and Index.hu) with a weekly reach of 24%, according to the Reuters Institute's annual news report. On 14 October 2019, the day after the Hungarian local elections, it reached a record daily viewership of 157 thousand unique visitors.
