= Jász-Nagykun-Szolnok County 4th constituency =

Hungarian national legislative constituency

Jász-Nagykun-Szolnok County 4th constituency (Törökszentmiklós)
- Constituency for the National Assembly
- Location of Jász-Nagykun-Szolnok county 04 within Jász-Nagykun-Szolnok county

- Location of Jász-Nagykun-Szolnok county within Hungary
- County: Jász-Nagykun-Szolnok
- Electorate: 76,192 (2018)
- Major settlements: Törökszentmiklós

Current constituency
- Created: 2011
- Party: Tisza Party
- Member: Csongor Farkas
- Created from: Constituency no. 5; Constituency no. 6; Constituency no. 7
- Elected: 2026

The 4th constituency of Jász-Nagykun-Szolnok County (Hungarian: Jász-Nagykun-Szolnok megyei 04. számú országgyűlési egyéni választókerület) is one of the single member constituencies of the National Assembly, the national legislature of Hungary. The constituency standard abbreviation: Jász-Nagykun-Szolnok 04. OEVK.

Since 2026, it has been represented by Csongor Farkas of the Tisza Party.

== Geography ==
The 4th constituency is located in the southern part of Jász-Nagykun-Szolnok County.

The constituency borders Jász-Nagykun-Szolnok County 3rd constituency to the northeast, 2nd constituency of Békés County to the southeast, 3rd constituency of Csongrád-Csanád County to the south, 4th constituency of Bács-Kiskun County and 2nd constituency of Bács-Kiskun County to the southwest, and Jász-Nagykun-Szolnok County 1st constituency to the northwest.

=== List of municipalities ===
The constituency includes the following municipalities:

1. Cibakháza
2. Csépa
3. Cserkeszőlő
4. Kengyel
5. Kétpó
6. Kuncsorba
7. Kunszentmárton
8. Martfű
9. Mesterszállás
10. Mezőhék
11. Mezőtúr
12. Nagyrév
13. Öcsöd
14. Örményes
15. Szajol
16. Szelevény
17. Tiszaföldvár
18. Tiszainoka
19. Tiszakürt
20. Tiszapüspöki
21. Tiszasas
22. Tiszatenyő
23. Törökszentmiklós

== History ==
The current 3rd constituency of Jász-Nagykun-Szolnok County was created in 2011 and contains the pre-2011 5th and 6th constituencies and part of the pre-2011 7th constituency of Jász-Nagykun-Szolnok. Its borders have not changed since its creation.

== Members ==
The constituency was first represented by István Boldog of the Fidesz from 2014 to 2022. He was succeeded by Zsolt Herczeg of the Fidesz in 2022. In the 2026 election, Csongor Farkas of the Tisza Party was elected representative.

Election	Member	Party	%	Ref.
2014	István Boldog	Fidesz	42.21	
2018	István Boldog	Fidesz	44.71	
2022	Zsolt Herczeg	Fidesz	51.50	
2026	Csongor Farkas	TISZA	54.18	

== Election result ==
=== 2022 election ===
Result 2022
1. Zsolt Herczeg, Fidesz–KDNP (51.5%)
2. Tamás Csányi, United for Hungary (37.1%)
3. Bettina Szabó, Our Homeland (8.20%)
4. Attila Farkas, MKKP (2.00%)
5. Other parties (less than 1%) (1.20%)

2022 parliamentary election: Jász-Nagykun-Szolnok County - 4th constituency
Party	Candidate	Votes	%	±%
Fidesz–KDNP	Zsolt Herczeg	23,667	51.50	+6.79
United for Hungary	Tamás Csányi	17,047	37.10	
Mi Hazánk	Bettina Szabó	3,756	8.17	New
MKKP	Attila Farkas	936	2.04	
NÉP	János Szegény	399	0.87	New
Leftist Alliance	Mihály Bencsik	148	0.32	
Majority		6,620	14.4	
Turnout		46,625	63.24	▼1.37
Registered electors		73,724		
Fidesz–KDNP hold		Swing	+10.5	

=== 2018 election ===
Result 2018
1. István Boldog, Fidesz–KDNP (44.7%)
2. Tamás Csányi, Jobbik (40.8%)
3. Endre Rózsa, MSZP-P (9.60%)
4. Virág Ecseki, LMP (2.30%)
5. Other parties (less than 1%) (2.60%)

2018 parliamentary election: Jász-Nagykun-Szolnok County - 4th constituency
Party	Candidate	Votes	%	±%
Fidesz–KDNP	István Boldog	21,668	44.71	+2.5
Jobbik	Tamás Csányi	19,760	40.78	+10.16
MSZP–Dialogue	Endre Rózsa	4,668	9.63	as Unity
LMP	Virág Ecseki	1,119	2.31	−0.26
Momentum	Károly Matisz	350	0.72	New
Workers' Party	András Szilágyi	270	0.56	−0.56
Family Party	Róbert Pusztai	207	0.43	
MIÉP	Gyula Pabar	84	0.17	
Democratic Party for Hungary	Edit Lakatos	81	0.17	
Common Ground	Virág Ágnes Kerezsi	58	0.12	
Motherland Party	Éva Kiss	55	0.11	−0.56
MCP	Ferenc Dani	42	0.09	
Medete Party	Attila Kántor	34	0.07	
NP	Miklós István Kádár	24	0.05	
Iránytű	Krisztián Tánczos	21	0.04	
ÖP	András Buzgán	18	0.04	
Majority		1,908	3.93	
Turnout		49,343	64.61	▲8.73
Registered electors		76,368		
Fidesz–KDNP hold		Swing	-7.7	

=== 2014 election ===
Result 2014
1. István Boldog, Fidesz–KDNP (42.2%)
2. Tamás Csányi, Jobbik (30.6%)
3. Endre Rózsa, Unity (21.4%)
4. Róbert Benedek Sallai, LMP (2.60%)
5. Péter Pozsonyi, Workers' Party (1.10%)
6. Other parties (less than 1%) (2.10%)

2014 parliamentary election: Jász-Nagykun-Szolnok County - 4th constituency
Party	Candidate	Votes	%	±%
Fidesz–KDNP	István Boldog	18,524	42.21	
Jobbik	Tamás Csányi	13,436	30.62	
Unity	Endre Rózsa	9,386	21.39	
LMP	Róbert Benedek Sallai	1,128	2.57	
Workers' Party	Péter Pozsonyi	490	1.12	
Motherland Party	Gáborné Sándor	294	0.67	
SMS	Ferenc Juhász	202	0.46	
FKGP	Ferenc Török	117	0.27	
JESZ	Andrásné Nagy	94	0.21	
MCP	Gusztáv Lakatos	83	0.19	
Soc Dems	László Váradi	74	0.17	
MDU	Hajnalka Szabó	56	0.13	
Majority		5,088	11.59	
Turnout		44,484	55.88	
Registered electors		79,613		
Fidesz–KDNP win (new seat)				
