= Jász-Nagykun-Szolnok County 3rd constituency =

Hungarian national legislative constituency

Jász-Nagykun-Szolnok County 3rd constituency (Karcag)
- Constituency for the National Assembly
- Location of Jász-Nagykun-Szolnok county 03 within Jász-Nagykun-Szolnok county

- Location of Jász-Nagykun-Szolnok county within Hungary
- County: Jász-Nagykun-Szolnok
- Electorate: 76,192 (2018)
- Major settlements: Karcag

Current constituency
- Created: 2011
- Party: Fidesz–KDNP
- Member: Sándor F. Kovács
- Created from: Constituency no. 8; Constituency no. 7; Constituency no. 6
- Elected: 2018, 2022, 2026

The 3rd constituency of Jász-Nagykun-Szolnok County (Hungarian: Jász-Nagykun-Szolnok megyei 03. számú országgyűlési egyéni választókerület) is one of the single member constituencies of the National Assembly, the national legislature of Hungary. The constituency standard abbreviation: Jász-Nagykun-Szolnok 03. OEVK.

Since 2018, it has been represented by Sándor F. Kovács of the Fidesz–KDNP party alliance.

== Geography ==
The 3rd constituency is located in the eastern part of Jász-Nagykun-Szolnok County.

The constituency borders the Borsod-Abaúj-Zemplén County 7th constituency to the north, the 5th constituency of Hajdú-Bihar County to the east, the 2nd constituency of Békés County to the southeast, the Jász-Nagykun-Szolnok County 4th constituency to the southwest, the Jász-Nagykun-Szolnok County 1st constituency and Jász-Nagykun-Szolnok County 2nd constituency to the west, and the Heves County 3rd constituency and 1st constituency of Heves County to the northwest.

=== List of municipalities ===
The constituency includes the following municipalities:

1. Abádszalók
2. Berekfürdő
3. Fegyvernek
4. Karcag
5. Kenderes
6. Kisújszállás
7. Kunhegyes
8. Kunmadaras
9. Nagyiván
10. Tiszabő
11. Tiszabura
12. Tiszaderzs
13. Tiszafüred
14. Tiszagyenda
15. Tiszaigar
16. Tiszaörs
17. Tiszaroff
18. Tiszaszentimre
19. Tiszaszőlős
20. Tomajmonostora
21. Túrkeve

== History ==
The 3rd constituency of Jász-Nagykun-Szolnok County was created in 2011 and contained parts of the pre-2011 abolished constituencies of 7th and 8th of this County. Its borders have not changed since its creation.

== Members ==
The constituency was first represented by Sándor Fazekas of the Fidesz from 2014 to 2018. Sándor F. Kovács of the Fidesz was elected in 2018, 2022, and 2026.

Election	Member	Party	%	Ref.
2014	Sándor Fazekas	Fidesz	51.77	
2018	Sándor F. Kovács	Fidesz	55.29	
2022	Sándor F. Kovács	Fidesz	64.14	
2026	Sándor F. Kovács	Fidesz	47.05	

== Election result ==
=== 2022 election ===
Result 2022
1. Sándor F. Kovács, Fidesz–KDNP (64.1%)
2. Dr. László György Lukács, United for Hungary (29.2%)
3. Róbert Somlay, Our Homeland (5.20%)
4. Bálint Ferenc Halmi, MEMO (1.00%)
5. József Nagy, Leftist Alliance (0.50%)

2022 parliamentary election: Jász-Nagykun-Szolnok County - 3rd constituency
Party	Candidate	Votes	%	±%
Fidesz–KDNP	Sándor F. Kovács	29,923	64.14	+8.85
United for Hungary	Dr. László György Lukács	13,614	29.18	
Mi Hazánk	Róbert Somlay	2,426	5.2	New
MEMO	Bálint Ferenc Halmi	468	1.0	New
Leftist Alliance	József Nagy	221	0.47	
Majority		16,309	34.96	
Turnout		47,417	63.13	▼0.67
Registered electors		75,111		
Fidesz–KDNP hold		Swing	+12.6	

=== 2018 election ===
Result 2018
1. Sándor F. Kovács, Fidesz–KDNP (55.3%)
2. Dr. László György Lukács, Jobbik (32.9%)
3. Jánosné Bodó, DK (5.40%)
4. Róbert Benedek Sallai, LMP (3.40%)
5. Other parties (less than 1%) (3.00%)

2018 parliamentary election: Jász-Nagykun-Szolnok County - 3rd constituency
Party	Candidate	Votes	%	±%
Fidesz–KDNP	Sándor F. Kovács	27,086	55.29	+3.52
Jobbik	Dr. László György Lukács	16,128	32.92	+7.23
DK	Jánosné Bodó	2,663	5.44	as Unity
LMP	Róbert Benedek Sallai	1,685	3.44	+1.32
Momentum	Richárd Mikle	442	0.9	New
Workers' Party	Sándor Horváth	342	0.7	−0.27
FKGP	Dezső Tóth	116	0.24	+0.06
Értünk Értetek	István Boros	112	0.23	
MIÉP	Zsigmond Zsákai	87	0.18	
Go Hungary!	Ildikó Zsuzsánna Magyar	80	0.16	
Motherland Party	Gyula Madar	72	0.16	−0.43
Democratic Party	Rozália Csirke	46	0.09	
ÖP	Leile Klaudia Balla	45	0.09	−0.07
Iránytű	Pálné Burai	32	0.07	
EU.ROM	István Túró	30	0.06	
Tenni Akarás	Vilmos Túró	26	0.05	
Majority		10,958	22.37	
Turnout		49,970	63.8	▲7.4
Registered electors		78,324		
Fidesz–KDNP hold		Swing	-3.7	

=== 2014 election ===
Result 2014
1. Dr. Sándor Fazekas, Fidesz–KDNP (51.8%)
2. Dr. László György Lukács, Jobbik (25.7%)
3. László Ozsváth, Unity (17.2%)
4. Ildikó Péntek, LMP (2.10%)
5. Krisztián Norbert Dull, Workers' Party (1.00%)
6. Other parties (less than 1%) (2.20%)

2014 parliamentary election: Jász-Nagykun-Szolnok County - 3rd constituency
Party	Candidate	Votes	%	±%
Fidesz–KDNP	Dr. Sándor Fazekas	23,201	51.77	
Jobbik	Dr. László György Lukács	11,511	25.69	
Unity	László Ozsváth	7,719	17.22	
LMP	Ildikó Péntek	948	2.12	
Workers' Party	Krisztián Norbert Dull	434	0.97	
Motherland Party	Edit Tóthné Ábrahám	263	0.59	
SMS	József Kapás	226	0.5	
Soc Dems	László Farkas	161	0.36	
MCP	Levente Kalló	85	0.19	
JESZ	Mariann Szilvia Földesné Keresztes	83	0.19	
FKGP	Gyula Nagy	80	0.18	
ÖP	Krisztina Pásztorné Kovács	72	0.16	
Nemzeti Érdekért	Ildikó Engler	20	0.04	
ÚMP	Martin Dániel Málovits	12	0.03	
Majority		11,690	26.08	
Turnout		45,476	56.4	
Registered electors		80,633		
Fidesz–KDNP win (new seat)				
