= Jász-Nagykun-Szolnok County 4th constituency (1990–2011) =

Jász-Nagykun-Szolnok County 4th constituency (Szolnok)
- Former Constituency for the National Assembly
- County: Jász-Nagykun-Szolnok

Former Constituency
- Created: 1990
- Abolished: 2011
- Replaced by: Constituency no. 1

The Jász-Nagykun-Szolnok County constituency no. 4 (Hungarian: Jász-Nagykun-Szolnok megye 04. számú egyéni választókerület) was one of the single member constituencies of the National Assembly, the national legislature of Hungary. The district was established in 1990, when the National Assembly was re-established with the end of the communist dictatorship. It was abolished in 2011.

== Members ==
The constituency was first represented by László Petronyák of the Hungarian Democratic Forum (MDF) from 1990 to 1994. István Füle of the Hungarian Socialist Party (MSZP) was elected in 1994 and served until 2006. Imre Iváncsik of the MSZP was elected in 2006 and served until 2010. In the 2010 election, Ildikó Jánosiné Bene of Fidesz was elected representative.

Election	Member	Party	%
1990	László Petronyák	MDF	42.9
1994	István Füle	MSZP	50.6
1998	István Füle	MSZP	53.0
2002	István Füle	MSZP	58.2
2006	Imre Iváncsik	MSZP	59.6
2010	Ildikó Jánosiné Bene	Fidesz	55.7

== Election result ==
=== 1990 election ===
1990 parliamentary election: Jász-Nagykun-Szolnok County - 4th constituency
Party	Candidate	Votes	%	±%
MDF	László Petronyák	5,406	18.28	
SZDSZ	Tamás Fodor	5,132	17.35	
MSZP	Libór Kovács	3,405	11.51	
Fidesz	Dr. Anikó Lévai	3,134	10.59	
FKGP	Tibor Dinka	2,651	8.96	
People's Party	Mihály Törőcsik	2,584	8.74	
Independent	József Cserfalvi	1,746	5.90	
Workers' Party	Jánosné Pozderka	1,670	5.65	
VP	Lajos Pócs	1,243	4.20	
HVK	Dr. Gyuláné Kovács	1,022	3.46	
Agrarian Alliance	Dr. Károly Stiegler	920	3.30	
Independent	Dr. László Fehérvári	611	2.07	
Turnout		30,202		
2nd round result
MDF	László Petronyák	8,836	42.91	
SZDSZ	Tamás Fodor	7,068	34.32	
MSZP	Libór Kovács	4,689	22.77	
Turnout		20,798		
MDF win (new seat)				
