= Jász-Nagykun-Szolnok County 3rd constituency (1990–2011) =

Jász-Nagykun-Szolnok County 3rd constituency (Szolnok)
- Former Constituency for the National Assembly
- County: Jász-Nagykun-Szolnok

Former Constituency
- Created: 1990
- Abolished: 2011
- Replaced by: Constituency no. 1; Constituency no. 2

The Jász-Nagykun-Szolnok County constituency no. 3 (Hungarian: Jász-Nagykun-Szolnok megye 03. számú egyéni választókerület) was one of the single member constituencies of the National Assembly, the national legislature of Hungary. The district was established in 1990, when the National Assembly was re-established with the end of the communist dictatorship. It was abolished in 2011.

== Members ==
The constituency was first represented by István Halász of the Hungarian Democratic Forum (MDF) from 1990 to 1994. Imre Iváncsik of the Hungarian Socialist Party (MSZP) was elected in 1994 and served until 2002. Lajosné Botka of the MSZP was elected in 2002, and re-elected in 2006. In the 2010 election, Ferenc Szalay of Fidesz was elected representative.

| Election | Member | Party | % |
|---|---|---|---|
| 1990 | István Halász | MDF | 45.8 |
| 1994 | Imre Iváncsik | MSZP | 53.4 |
| 1998 | Imre Iváncsik | MSZP | 53.7 |
| 2002 | Lajosné Botka | MSZP | 56.1 |
| 2006 | Lajosné Botka | MSZP | 55.7 |
| 2010 | Ferenc Szalay | Fidesz | 59.7 |

== Election result ==
=== 1990 election ===
1990 parliamentary election: Jász-Nagykun-Szolnok County - 3rd constituency
| Party | Candidate | Votes | % | ±% |
|---|---|---|---|---|
| MDF | István Halász | 5,452 | 23.18 | |
| SZDSZ | Zoltán Hortobágyi | 5,107 | 21.71 | |
| FKGP | Zsolt Posta | 2,874 | 12.22 | |
| MSZP | Dr. Károly Szegedi | 2,825 | 12.01 | |
| Fidesz | Attila Várhegyi | 2,558 | 10.88 | |
| HVK | Dr. Magdolna Szóró | 1,714 | 7.29 | |
| Workers' Party | Ferenc Nagy | 1,566 | 6.66 | |
| Agrarian Alliance | József Harasztosi | 1,424 | 6.05 | |
| Turnout | | 24,138 | | |
2nd round result
| MDF | István Halász | 6,451 | 45.79 | |
| SZDSZ | Zoltán Hortobágyi | 5,183 | 36.79 | |
| FKGP | Zsolt Posta | 2,454 | 17.42 | |
| Turnout | | 14,477 | | |
| MDF win (new seat) | | | | |
