= Jász-Nagykun-Szolnok County 6th constituency (1990–2011) =

Jász-Nagykun-Szolnok County 6th constituency (Mezőtúr)
- Former Constituency for the National Assembly
- County: Jász-Nagykun-Szolnok

Former Constituency
- Created: 1990
- Abolished: 2011
- Replaced by: Constituency no. 4; Constituency no. 3

The Jász-Nagykun-Szolnok County constituency no. 6 (Hungarian: Jász-Nagykun-Szolnok megye 06. számú egyéni választókerület) was one of the single member constituencies of the National Assembly, the national legislature of Hungary. The district was established in 1990, when the National Assembly was re-established with the end of the communist dictatorship. It was abolished in 2011.

== Members ==
The constituency was first represented by Albert Tóth of the Hungarian Democratic Forum (MDF) from 1990 to 1994. István Tokár of the Hungarian Socialist Party (MSZP) was elected in 1994 and served until 1998. In 1998 Lajos Búsi of Fidesz was elected representative. Endre Rózsa of the MSZP was elected in 2002 and served until 2010. In 2010 election followed by István Boldog of Fidesz.

Election	Member	Party	%
1990	Albert Tóth	MDF	34.2
1994	István Tokár	MSZP	51.4
1998	Lajos Búsi	Fidesz	51.8
2002	Endre Rózsa	MSZP	54.6
2006	Endre Rózsa	MSZP	50.3
2010	István Boldog	Fidesz	56.4

== Election result ==
=== 1990 election ===
1990 parliamentary election: Jász-Nagykun-Szolnok County - 6th constituency
Party	Candidate	Votes	%	±%
MDF	Dr. Albert Tóth	4,268	21.09	
SZDSZ	Gyula Árvai	3,532	17.45	
MSZP	Dr. Dénes Draskovits	3,166	15.64	
FKGP	Dr. Valéria Szunyogh	3,088	15.26	
Independent	Mihály Lázár	1,339	6.62	
MSZDP	Dr. László Bujdosó	1,178	5.82	
Workers' Party	János Papp	981	4.82	
People's Party	Béla Szeremley	846	4.18	
Independent	Sándor Mázik	808	3.99	
VP	Mihály Sánta	629	3.11	
HVK	Sándor Perjési	406	2.01	
Turnout		20,801		
2nd round result
MDF	Dr. Albert Tóth	5,276	34.19	
SZDSZ	Gyula Árvai	3,987	25.84	
MSZP	Dr. Dénes Draskovits	3,384	21.93	
FKGP	Dr. Valéria Szunyogh	2,785	18.05	
Turnout		15,608		
MDF win (new seat)				
