= Jász-Nagykun-Szolnok County 1st constituency =

Hungarian national legislative constituency

Jász-Nagykun-Szolnok County 1st constituency (Szolnok)
- Constituency for the National Assembly
- Location of Jász-Nagykun-Szolnok county 01 within Jász-Nagykun-Szolnok county

- Location of Jász-Nagykun-Szolnok county within Hungary
- County: Jász-Nagykun-Szolnok
- Electorate: 72,839 (2018)
- Major settlements: Szolnok

Current constituency
- Created: 2011
- Party: Tisza Party
- Member: Andrea Rost
- Created from: Constituency no. 3; Constituency no. 4
- Elected: 2026

The 1st constituency of Jász-Nagykun-Szolnok County (Hungarian: Jász-Nagykun-Szolnok megyei 01. számú országgyűlési egyéni választókerület) is one of the single member constituencies of the National Assembly, the national legislature of Hungary. The constituency standard abbreviation: Jász-Nagykun-Szolnok 01. OEVK.

Since 2026, it has been represented by Andrea Rost of the Tisza Party.

== Boundaries ==
The 1st constituency is located in western part of Jász-Nagykun-Szolnok County.

The constituency borders with 2nd constituency to the north, 3rd constituency to the east, 4th constituency to the southeast, 2nd constituency of Bács-Kiskun County and 12th constituency of Pest County to the west.

=== List of municipalities ===
The constituency includes the following municipalities:

1. Besenyszög
2. Csataszög
3. Hunyadfalva
4. Kőtelek
5. Nagykörű
6. Rákóczifalva
7. Rákócziújfalu
8. Szászberek
9. Szolnok
10. Tiszajenő
11. Tiszavárkony
12. Tószeg
13. Vezseny
14. Zagyvarékas

== History ==
The 1st constituency of Jász-Nagykun-Szolnok County was created in 2011 and contained parts of the pre-2011 abolished constituencies of 3rd and 4th of this County. Its borders have not changed since its creation.

== Members ==
The constituency was first represented by Ildikó Bene of the Fidesz from 2014 to 2018. Mária Kállai of the Fidesz was elected in 2018 and she was re-elected in 2022. In the 2026 election, Andrea Rost of the Tisza Party was elected representative.

Election	Member	Party	%	Ref.
2014	Ildikó Bene	Fidesz	37.30	
2018	Mária Kállai	Fidesz	42.09	
2022	Mária Kállai	Fidesz	46.91	
2026	Andrea Rost	TISZA	58.84	

== Election result ==
=== 2026 election ===
Result 2026
1. Andrea Rost, TISZA (58.8%)
2. Attila Berkó, Fidesz–KDNP (32.5%)
3. Roland Kapás, Our Homeland (6.70%)
4. Dávid Mézsáros, DK (1.20%)
5. Other parties (less than 1%) (0.80%)

2026 parliamentary election: Jász-Nagykun-Szolnok County - 1st constituency
Party	Candidate	Votes	%	±%
Tisza	Andrea Rost	35,110	58.84	New
Fidesz–KDNP	Attila Berkó	19,362	32.45	−14.46
Mi Hazánk	Roland Kapás	3,979	6.67	−0.7
DK	Dávid Mézsáros	699	1.17	
MKKP	Péter Viczán	437	0.73	−2.17
Munkáspárt–Solidarity	Imre Attiláné Bálogh	84	0.14	
Majority		15,748	26.39	
Turnout		60,069	80.33	▲10.5
Registered electors		74,779		
Tisza gain from Fidesz–KDNP		Swing	+19.22	

=== 2022 election ===
Result 2022
1. Dr. Mária Kállai, Fidesz–KDNP (46.9%)
2. Pál Sziráki, United for Hungary (39.2%)
3. Béla Vincze, Our Homeland (7.40%)
4. Péter Viczián, MKKP (2.90%)
5. Erika Korpai, MEMO (1.20%)
6. Dr. Attila Csikós, PV (1.00%)
7. Other parties (less than 1%) (1.40%)

2022 parliamentary election: Jász-Nagykun-Szolnok County - 1st constituency
Party	Candidate	Votes	%	±%
Fidesz–KDNP	Dr. Mária Kállai	24,972	46.91	+4.82
United for Hungary	Pál Sziráki	20,864	39.2	
Mi Hazánk	Béla Vincze	3,921	7.37	New
MKKP	Péter Viczián	1,545	2.9	
MEMO	Erika Korpai	650	1.22	New
PV	Dr. Attila Csikós	521	0.98	New
NÉP	Mónika Varga	460	0.86	New
Leftist Alliance	Attila Németh	296	0.56	
Majority		4,108	7.17	
Turnout		54,065	69.83	▼0.42
Registered electors		77,426		
Fidesz–KDNP hold		Swing	+0.7	

=== 2018 election ===
Result 2018
1. Dr. Mária Kállai, Fidesz–KDNP (42.1%)
2. Dr. Attila Csikós, Jobbik (35.1%)
3. Mihály Győrfi, MSZP-P (15.2%)
4. Dr. István Kelemen, LMP (3.60%)
5. Éva Szekeres, Momentum (1.50%)
6. Other parties (less than 1%) (2.50%)

2018 parliamentary election: Jász-Nagykun-Szolnok County - 1st constituency
Party	Candidate	Votes	%	±%
Fidesz–KDNP	Dr. Mária Kállai	23,665	42.09	+4.79
Jobbik	Dr. Attila Csikós	19,746	35.12	+9.49
MSZP–Dialogue	Mihály Győrfi	8,520	15.15	as Unity
LMP	Dr. István Kelemen	2,028	3.61	−0.88
Momentum	Éva Szekeres	863	1.53	New
Workers' Party	Mihály Bencsik	427	0.76	−0.42
Family Party	László Pásztor	223	0.4	
MIÉP	Tivadar Szép	164	0.29	
SEM	Dr. Gábor Balogh	154	0.27	
Democratic Party	Roland Vallyon	133	0.24	
Értünk Értetek	István Győre	63	0.11	
NP	Éva Szabó	47	0.08	
MCP	István Farkas	41	0.07	−0.18
KÖSSZ	Zsuzsanna Káposztás	40	0.07	
Medete Party	Erzsébet Mester	39	0.07	
Iránytű	Dávid Pálfi	26	0.05	
AQP	Péter Miklósné Varga	18	0.03	−0.07
ÖP	Csilla Veress	18	0.03	
JÓ ÚT MPP	Olivér Farkas	12	0.02	
Majority		3,919	6.97	
Turnout		56,672	70.25	▲7.57
Registered electors		80,671		
Fidesz–KDNP hold		Swing	-1.9	

=== 2014 election ===
Result 2014
1. Dr. Ildikó Bene, Fidesz–KDNP (37.3%)
2. Imre Iváncsik, Unity (28.4%)
3. Zsolt György Baráth, Jobbik (25.6%)
4. Dr. Ernő Zoltán Pethő, LMP (4.50%)
5. Mihály Bencsik, Workers' Party (1.20%)
6. Other parties (less than 1%) (3.00%)

2014 parliamentary election: Jász-Nagykun-Szolnok County - 1st constituency
Party	Candidate	Votes	%	±%
Fidesz–KDNP	Dr. Ildikó Bene	19,146	37.3	
Unity	Imre Iváncsik	14,574	28.39	
Jobbik	Zsolt György Baráth	13,157	25.63	
LMP	Dr. Ernő Zoltán Pethő	2,303	4.49	
Workers' Party	Mihály Bencsik	604	1.18	
SMS	Zoltán Horváth	393	0.77	
Motherland Party	Antal Dezső Hári	296	0.58	
FKGP	Tamás Kézér	212	0.41	
Soc Dems	Dr. Miklós Pálfi	176	0.34	
JESZ	Dr. Ilona Kenyeresné Kosik	148	0.29	
MCP	János Jakab	126	0.25	
MGP	Zsolt József Hadvina	112	0.22	
AQP	József Nagy	51	0.1	
Nemzeti Érdekért	Tibor Reiner	37	0.07	
Majority		4,572	8.91	
Turnout		51,877	62.68	
Registered electors		82,767		
Fidesz–KDNP win (new seat)				

== Statistics ==
Election	Electorate		Turnout		
Election	No.	Change	No.	%	Change
2014	82,767 (record)	n/a	51,877	62.68	n/a
2018	▼80,671	-2.5%	▲56,672	▲70.25 (record)	7.6
2022
