= Jász-Nagykun-Szolnok County 5th constituency (1990–2011) =

Jász-Nagykun-Szolnok County 5th constituency (Kunszentmárton)
- Former Constituency for the National Assembly
- County: Jász-Nagykun-Szolnok

Former Constituency
- Created: 1990
- Abolished: 2011
- Replaced by: Constituency no. 4

The Jász-Nagykun-Szolnok County constituency no. 5 (Hungarian: Jász-Nagykun-Szolnok megye 05. számú egyéni választókerület) was one of the single member constituencies of the National Assembly, the national legislature of Hungary. The district was established in 1990, when the National Assembly was re-established with the end of the communist dictatorship. It was abolished in 2011.

== Members ==
The constituency was first represented by István Molnár of the Hungarian Democratic Forum (MDF) from 1990 to 1994. Imre Farkas of the Hungarian Socialist Party (MSZP) was elected in 1994 and served until 2010. In 2010 election followed by István Sági of Fidesz.

Election	Member	Party	%
1990	István Molnár	MDF	37.3
1994	Imre Farkas	MSZP	52.5
1998	Imre Farkas	MSZP	42.1
2002	Imre Farkas	MSZP	50.5
2006	Imre Farkas	MSZP	50.7
2010	István Sági	Fidesz	58.8

== Election result ==
=== 1990 election ===
1990 parliamentary election: Jász-Nagykun-Szolnok County - 5th constituency
Party	Candidate	Votes	%	±%
SZDSZ	Dr. Edit Kiss	4,922	24.19	
MDF	István Molnár	3,448	16.94	
FKGP	Dr. Miklós K. Csontos	3,308	16.26	
MSZP	István Jauernik	2,703	13.28	
HVK	Dr. László Sári	1,529	7.51	
Agrarian Alliance	György Torkos	1,486	7.30	
Independent	János Túróczi	1,217	5.89	
VP	György Fialka	983	4.83	
Independent	László Tóth	753	3.70	
Turnout		21,034		
2nd round result
MDF	István Molnár	4,867	37.29	
SZDSZ	Dr. Edit Kiss	4,767	36.52	
FKGP	Dr. Miklós K. Csontos	3,419	26.19	
Turnout		13,368		
MDF win (new seat)				
