= Jász-Nagykun-Szolnok County 8th constituency (1990–2011) =

Jász-Nagykun-Szolnok County 8th constituency (Karcag)
- Former Constituency for the National Assembly
- County: Jász-Nagykun-Szolnok

Former Constituency
- Created: 1990
- Abolished: 2011
- Replaced by: Constituency no. 3

The Jász-Nagykun-Szolnok County constituency no. 8 (Hungarian: Jász-Nagykun-Szolnok megye 08. számú egyéni választókerület) was one of the single member constituencies of the National Assembly, the national legislature of Hungary. The district was established in 1990, when the National Assembly was re-established with the end of the communist dictatorship. It was abolished in 2011.

== Members ==
The constituency was first represented by János Szabó of the Hungarian Democratic Forum (MDF) from 1990 to 1994. In the 1994 election, János Kasuba of Hungarian Socialist Party (MSZP) was elected representative. In 1998 elelction Mihály Varga was elected of the Fidesz and served until 2014.

Election	Member	Party	%
1990	János Szabó	MDF	59.9
1994	János Kasuba	MSZP	53.8
1998	Mihály Varga	Fidesz	51.6
2002	Mihály Varga	Fidesz	55.1
2006	Mihály Varga	Fidesz	53.4
2010	Mihály Varga	Fidesz	65.0

== Election result ==
=== 1990 election ===
1990 parliamentary election: Jász-Nagykun-Szolnok County - 8th constituency
Party	Candidate	Votes	%	±%
MDF	Dr. János Szabó	7,614	31.48	
FKGP	Dr. László Varga	3,282	13.57	
Fidesz	Mihály Varga	2,483	10.27	
MSZP	József Dányi	2,358	9.75	
Agrarian Alliance	Dr. János Kasuba	2,111	8.73	
People's Party	Dr. Mihály Bugán	1,877	7.76	
SZDSZ	Lajos Csecskedy	1,782	7.37	
HVK	György Fekete	1,176	4.86	
HVK	Péter Bóka	812	3.36	
VMP	Dr. Dezső Herédy	690	2.85	
Turnout		25,013		
2nd round result
MDF	Dr. János Szabó	8,753	59.92	
FKGP	Dr. László Varga	3,276	22.43	
Fidesz	Mihály Varga	2,579	17.65	
Turnout		14,961		
MDF win (new seat)				
