= Jász-Nagykun-Szolnok County 7th constituency (1990–2011) =

Jász-Nagykun-Szolnok County 7th constituency (Kunhegyes)
- Former Constituency for the National Assembly
- County: Jász-Nagykun-Szolnok

Former Constituency
- Created: 1990
- Abolished: 2011
- Replaced by: Constituency no. 3; Constituency no. 4

The Jász-Nagykun-Szolnok County constituency no. 7 (Hungarian: Jász-Nagykun-Szolnok megye 07. számú egyéni választókerület) was one of the single member constituencies of the National Assembly, the national legislature of Hungary. The district was established in 1990, when the National Assembly was re-established with the end of the communist dictatorship. It was abolished in 2011.

== Members ==
The constituency was first represented by Lajos Szabó of the Hungarian Democratic Forum (MDF) from 1990 to 1994. In the 1994 election, Sándor Buzás of Hungarian Socialist Party (MSZP) was elected representative. In 1998 elelction Imre Herbály was elected of the MSZP and served until 2010. In 2010 election followed by Andor Fejér of Fidesz.

Election	Member	Party	%
1990	Lajos Szabó	MDF	44.6
1994	Sándor Buzás	MSZP	56.5
1998	Imre Herbály	MSZP	47.4
2002	Imre Herbály	MSZP	52.0
2006	Imre Herbály	MSZP	51.8
2010	Andor Fejér	Fidesz	58.3

== Election result ==
=== 1990 election ===
1990 parliamentary election: Jász-Nagykun-Szolnok County - 7th constituency
Party	Candidate	Votes	%	±%
MDF	Dr. Lajos Szabó	4,417	17.09	
FKGP	Imre Dögei	3,990	15.44	
SZDSZ	Antal Tolnai	3,203	12.39	
MSZP	Imre Herbály	3,008	11.64	
MSZDP	Imréné Mezei	2,506	9.70	
FKGP	István Szelekovszky	2,329	9.01	
Independent	Dr. Sándor Slezák	2,013	7.79	
HVK	Zsigmond Sipos	1,798	6.96	
VP	Ignác Túri	1,659	6.42	
Independent	Sándor Elekes	922	3.57	
Turnout		26,792		
2nd round result
MDF	Dr. Lajos Szabó	7,013	44.62	
FKGP	Imre Dögei	4,804	30.57	
SZDSZ	Antal Tolnai	3,900	24.81	
Turnout		16,082		
MDF win (new seat)				
