= Andrea Rost =

Hungarian lyric soprano (born 1962)

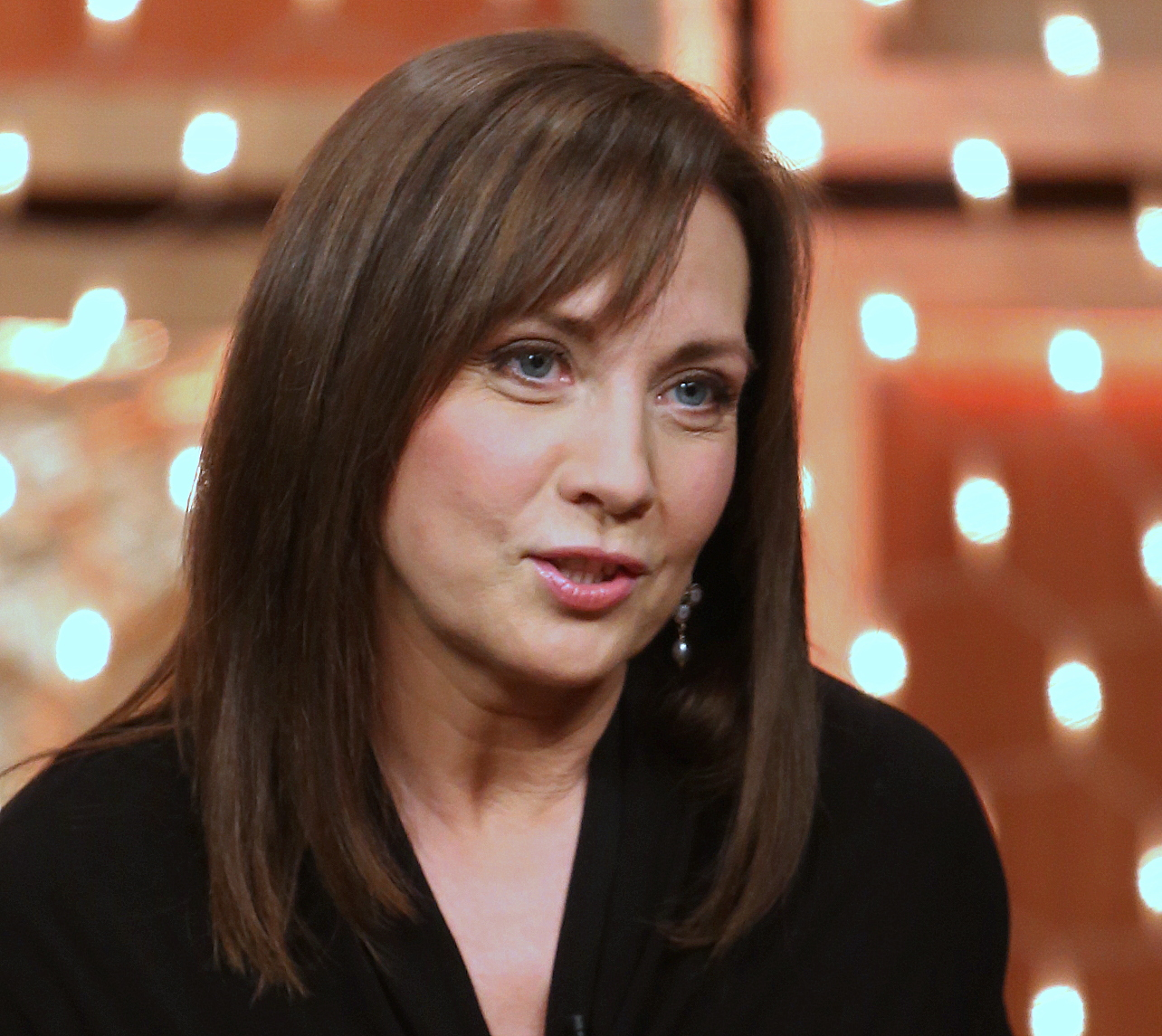
- Rost in 2013

Commissioner for Hungarian Music Culture
- Incumbent
- Assumed office 13 May 2026
- Prime Minister: Peter Magyar
- Preceded by: Office established

Member of the National Assembly
- Incumbent
- Assumed office 9 May 2026
- Preceded by: Mária Kállai
- Constituency: Jász-Nagykun-Szolnok 1st

Personal details
- Born: 15 June 1962 (age 64) Budapest, Hungary
- Occupation: Politician

Andrea Rost (born 15 June 1962) is a Hungarian lyric soprano and politician. She has performed in leading roles with the Vienna State Opera, La Scala, the Royal Opera House, Opéra National de Paris, the Metropolitan Opera and the Salzburg Festival. The year 1997 saw the release of her first solo recording, Le delizie dell’amor, featuring arias from bel canto, Verdi and Puccini operas.

== Biography ==
Andrea Rost was born in Budapest. She graduated from the Liszt Ferenc Academy of Music as the pupil of Zsolt Bende. She was still a student with a scholarship from the Budapest Opera when she sang Juliette in Gounod’s Romeo et Juliette at the Budapest Opera House in 1989.

=== Opera career ===
Two years later, in 1991, she became the soloist of the Staatsoper in Vienna, where she sang all her major roles; the connoisseur audience of Vienna heard performances of the roles of Zerlina through Adina and Susanna to Lucia di Lammermoor and Violetta, as well as at a number of concerts.

She enjoyed a roaring international success at the première of Rigoletto at La Scala in 1994, where she had been invited by Riccardo Muti, and she has been a regular guest singer there ever since. She was already a celebrated star when in 1995 she sang Pamina at the première of Die Zauberflöte at the night of the season at La Scala to great acclaim. These roles were followed by Susanna in Mozart’s Le Nozze di Figaro, and Violetta in Verdi’s La Traviata. In 2006 January she performed several times the role of Gilda at Teatro alla Scala.

At the Salzburg Festival, she performed in several productions, including R. Strauss’s Die Frau ohne Schatten (Voice of the Falcon, under Georg Solti), Monteverdi’s L’Incoronazione di Poppea (Drusilla, under Nikolaus Harnoncourt), Verdi’s Traviata (Violetta, under Riccardo Muti), and Mussorgsky’s Boris Godunov (Xenia, under Claudio Abbado). In L'Opéra Bastille de Paris she sang Susanna, Gilda, Lucia, and Antonia (in Offenbach’s Les contes d’Hoffmann).

In the Royal Opera House in Covent Garden she made her debut as Susanna, then went on to sing Violetta with great success. She sang the title role of Donizetti’s Elisabeth (Il castello di Kenilworth) at a concert performance, which was also a world première. In the season of 2003/2004 she has performed as Lucia di Lammermoor.

In Teatro Real Madrid she sang the role of Blanche of Poulenc's Les dialogues des Carmélites in June 2006.

In the United States, she has performed at the Chicago Lyric Opera several times, singing Zerlina, Gilda, Violetta, and Giulietta (Bellini: I Capuleti e i Montecchi), in October 2005 she performed as Micaëla. She made her debut in the Metropolitan Opera, New York in 1996 as Adina in Donizetti’s L'elisir d'amore, later appearing there as Gilda, Lucia, and Violetta as well. Last time, in April 2006, she sang Susanna at the Metropolitan. She sang Antonia at the Washington Opera, and appeared in the Los Angeles Opera in the same role. In March 2002, she sang Pamina in Los Angeles. In April 2005 she performed as Pamina several times at Washington.

She is often invited to sing at the New National Theatre Tokyo. At the Budapest Opera, she often sings her favourite roles of Gilda, Lucia di Lammermoor and Violetta.

She sings Mozart arias from Don Giovanni and Le Nozze di Figaro on her latest released CD album performing eight different roles. The DVD-version of this recording is available.

In 1997, she won the Liszt Prize and, in 2004, the Kossuth Prize. She has been the holder of the title ”Artist of Merit” since 1999.

=== Politics ===
In the 2026 Hungarian parliamentary election, Rost has been elected as the representative of the Jász-Nagykun-Szolnok County 1st constituency as the candidate of the Tisza Party. In the incoming Magyar Government, Rost will be a government commissioner responsible for Hungarian music culture.
