= Róbert Pap =

Jewish council member in Hungary

Member of the Provisional National Assembly
- In office 21 December 1944 – 29 November 1945

Personal details
- Born: Róbert Kohn; 11 September 1874 Szelevény, Austria-Hungary
- Died: 17 August 1947 (aged 72) Szeged, Hungary
- Party: F48P; PRP; PSZP; PDP
- Spouse: Lujza Vámosi
- Profession: lawyer, politician

Róbert Pap (né Kohn; 11 September 1874 – 17 August 1947) was a Hungarian Jewish lawyer and politician. He was head of the Jewish Council (Judenrat) of Szeged during the Holocaust. He was a member of the Provisional National Assembly from 1944 to 1945, as a politician of the Civic Democratic Party (PDP).

== Early life ==
Róbert Pap (sometimes incorrectly Papp) was born into a Judaist family as Róbert Kohn on 11 September 1874 in Szelevény, Jász–Nagykun–Szolnok County, as the son of merchant Jehuda József Kohn (1841–1910) and Cecília Bak (1845–1897). His elder brother was Géza Pap (1868–1960), who converted from Judaism and served as Secretary of State for Labour from 1928 to 1933. His other brother was Dezső Pap (1871–1930), who was Deputy Secretary of State for Trade between 1918 and 1919.

Pap finished his secondary studies in Szeged in 1891. He graduated with a law degree at the University of Budapest (present-day Eötvös Loránd University, ELTE). He opened his law firm in Szeged in 1900, and worked as a lawyer until 1945. He chaired the Szeged branch of the Sociological Society since 1906. He was an unsuccessful candidate of the opposition Party of Independence and '48 (F48P) during the 1906 Hungarian parliamentary election. Pap fought in the World War I.

== Career ==
Pap was elected president of the National Council of Szeged during the Aster Revolution in 1918, following the end of war. He was a supporter of the Civic Radical Party (PRP) at that time. He cooperated with the local directorate during the Hungarian Soviet Republic too. He turned against the Communists and became a member of the Anti-Bolshevist Committee (ABC), as a legal counsel of the local Jewish community upon the request of Gyula Károlyi, who established his counter-revolutionary government in Szeged in the spring of 1919. During the Horthy regime, he was considered an opposition politician, promoting liberal and civic democratic views. He chaired the local branch of the minor Independence and '48 Kossuth Party. He was elected a substitute member of the Diet of Hungary in the 1926 Hungarian parliamentary election, under the banner Civic Freedom Party.

He was a member of the municipal authority of Szeged from 1901 to 1944. During one of his speeches in 1936, he demanded strong action against the fascist Arrow Cross Party. He presided over the local Neolog Jewish religious congregation from 1938 to 1944 (1945). Besides his position in Szeged, Pap also served as one of the vice-presidents of the National Office of Israelites of Hungary (MIOI) from 1943.

== During the Holocaust ==
The Nazi Germany invaded and occupied the Kingdom of Hungary in March 1944. The local congregation of Szeged was instantly transformed into a Judenrat headed by Pap too. He participated in that general meeting of the Jewish leaders in Budapest on 28 March, where the Central Jewish Council was established upon the demand of the German authorities. It is possible that, he also chaired a regional Jewish council simultaneously; in a letter, Gyula Virányi, the secretary-general of the religious community (later council) in Kecskemét asked for Pap's intercession to free their president, the interned Lajos Vajda. Later Virányi himself was also interned and deported. Thereafter, however, Dezső Schönberger was appointed head of the local council in Kecskemét by the Jewish (central) council of Budapest itself on 21 April, which objected against the existence of regional councils.

As head of the council, Pap tried to extort concessions for his community through submissions to the local authorities, mentioning the community's anti-Bolshevik role during the 1919 counter-revolution. Pap also emphasized his WW1 military service. The deportation of Jews occurred within weeks. He tried to intercede with Prince-primate Jusztinián Serédi, the Archbishop of Esztergom, who visiting the city, to save the Jews. He also sent a letter to Lord Lieutenant Aladár Magyary-Kossa, in which he detailed the special past of local Jewish community, among whom "there are no infiltrated foreign Jews" and recalled the counter-revolutionary activity of the local Jewry during the Hungarian Soviet Republic.

Before the deportation of the entire community, Pap fled to Budapest on 21 June 1944, where his brother Géza Pap, a civil servant of the Hungarian government, sheltered him. Some weeks later, he was arrested by the gendarmerie and taken back to Szeged. Due to his former military service, he was exempted from deportation on 19 August 1944.

== After the war ==
The advancing Red Army besieged and occupied Szeged in October 1944. His membership in the bar association was reinstated in the same month and was re-elected president of the reconstituted Neolog congregation. Alongside Zoltán Örley, he organized the local branch of the Civic Democratic Party in late November 1944. Both of them were elected to the National Committee of Szeged on 2 December. Pap and Örley were delegated to the Provisional National Assembly on 16 December 1944, representing the aforementioned body. Simultaneously, Pap also became a member of the city's provisional legislation. He was elected a member of the party presidium in May 1945 and headed its local branch in Szeged until his death.

Pap served as grand master of the masonic lodge of Szeged from 1945 to 1946. He was a founding member and attorney of the cultural society Home of Szegeder Journalists and Artists.

The verification committee of the Jewish congregation of Szeged failed to verify Pap's activity during the Holocaust in the spring of 1946. He was accused of participating in the selection process in the Szeged ghetto among the deportees who would be sent to Auschwitz and who would be sent to Budapest or Strasshof, where the chance of survival was greater (about 75 percent of 21,000 Hungarian Jews deported to Strasshof survived due to an agreement between the Aid and Rescue Committee of Budapest and Adolf Eichmann). His case was forwarded to the People's Prosecutor's Office. In May 1946, Pap emphasized his anti-fascist attitude and that he lost many relatives during the Holocaust. The People's Prosecutor's Office closed the investigation without filing charges. Pap retired from public life in 1946, but remained honorary president of the local bar association and the Jewish congregation. He died on 17 August 1947.

== Sources ==
- Szabó, Róbert (1994). "Papp (sic!) Róbert [Róbert Pap]". In Vida, István; Kiss, József; Somlyai, Magda (eds.). Az Ideiglenes Nemzetgyűlés almanachja 1944–1945 [The Almanach of the Provisional National Assembly 1944–1945] (in Hungarian). National Assembly. p. 333. ISBN 963-03-3857-2.
- Veszprémy, László Bernát (2021). "Kik vezették a vidéki zsidó tanácsokat? [Who led the rural Jewish councils?]". Múlt és Jövő (Új folyam) (in Hungarian). 32 (1): 101–117. ISSN 0864-8646.
- Veszprémy, László Bernát (2023). Tanácstalanság. A zsidó vezetés Magyarországon és a holokauszt, 1944–1945 [Bereft of Council. Jewish leadership in Hungary during the Holocaust in 1944–1945] (in Hungarian). Budapest: Jaffa Kiadó. ISBN 978-963-475-731-3.
