= Csongor Farkas =

Hungarian politician (born 1992)

Member of the National Assembly
- Incumbent
- Assumed office 9 May 2026
- Preceded by: Zsolt Herczeg
- Constituency: Jász-Nagykun-Szolnok 1st

Personal details
- Born: 1992 (age 33–34)
- Party: Tisza Party

Csongor Farkas (born 1992) is a Hungarian politician who was elected member of the National Assembly in 2026. He has been a municipal councillor of Mezőtúr since 2024.
