= Kunszentmárton District =

Coordinates: 46.9000°N 20.2500°E

Kunszentmárton District Kunszentmártoni járás
- Districts of Hungary
- Coat of arms

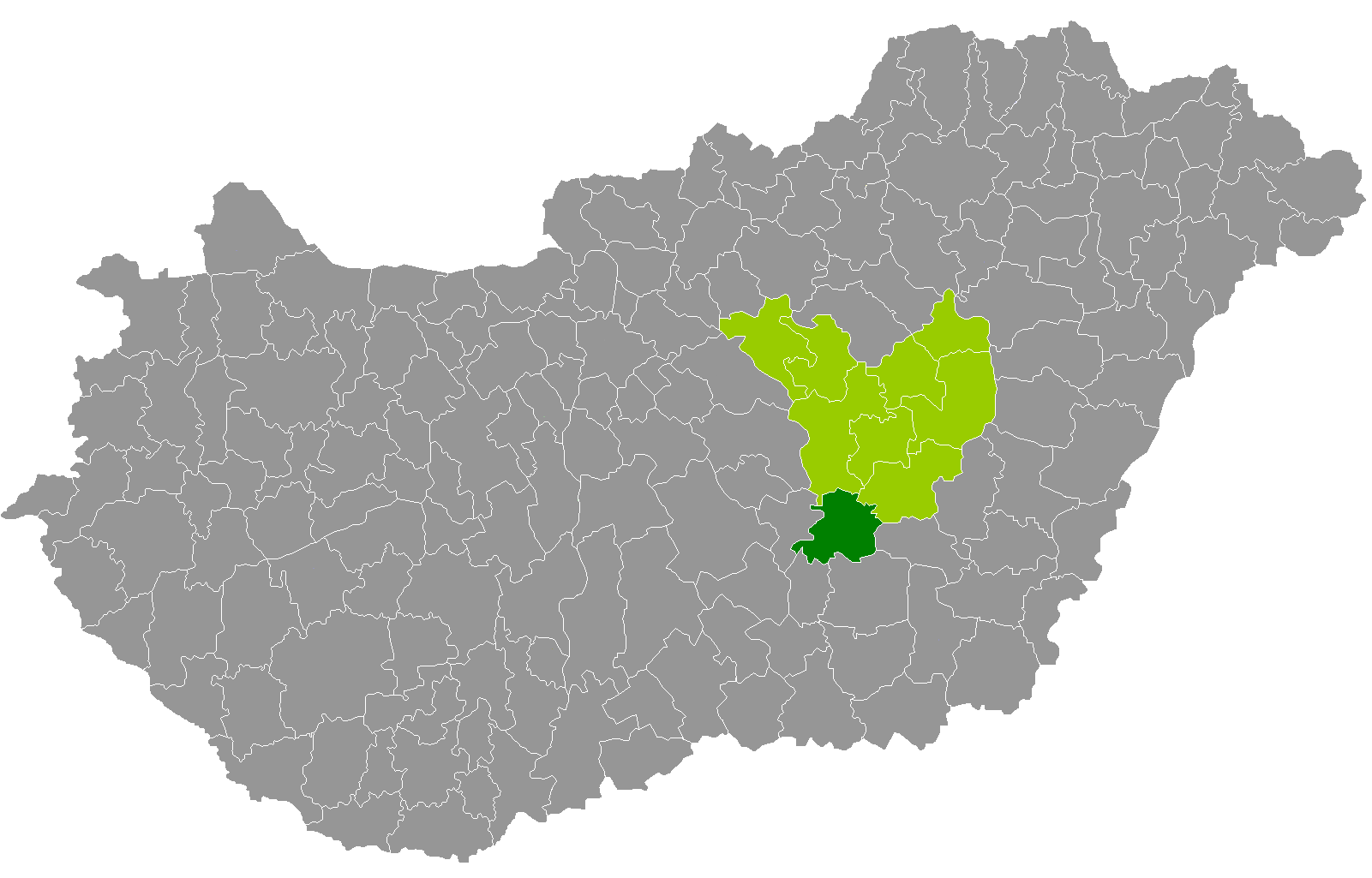
- Kunszentmárton District within Hungary and Jász-Nagykun-Szolnok County.
- Country: Hungary
- County: Jász-Nagykun-Szolnok
- District seat: Kunszentmárton

Area
  - Total: 576.49 km^{2} (222.58 sq mi)
  - Rank: 5th in Jász-Nagykun-Szolnok

Population (2011 census)
  - Total: 36,147
  - Rank: 5th in Jász-Nagykun-Szolnok
  - Density: 63/km^{2} (160/sq mi)

Kunszentmárton (Hungarian: Kunszentmártoni járás) is a district in southern part of Jász-Nagykun-Szolnok County. Kunszentmárton is also the name of the town where the district seat is found. The district is located in the Northern Great Plain Statistical Region. This district is a part of Nagykunság historical and geographical region.

== Geography ==
Kunszentmárton District borders with Szolnok District and Mezőtúr District to the north, Szarvas District (Békés County) to the east, Szentes District and Csongrád District (Csongrád County) to the south, Cegléd District and Tiszakécske District (Bács-Kiskun County) to the west. The number of the inhabited places in Kunszentmárton District is 11.

== Municipalities ==
The district has 2 towns, 2 large villages and 7 villages. (ordered by population, as of 1 January 2012)

- Cibakháza (4,327)
- Csépa (1,535)
- Cserkeszőlő (2,090)
- **Kunszentmárton** (8,373) – district seat
- Nagyrév (729)
- Öcsöd (3,199)
- Szelevény (1,050)
- **Tiszaföldvár** (11,120)
- Tiszainoka (415)
- Tiszakürt (1,353)
- Tiszasas (985)

The bolded municipalities are cities, italics municipalities are large villages.

== Demographics ==
Religion in Kunszentmárton District (2011 census)
1. Catholic Church (27.9%)
2. Greek Catholicism (0.10%)
3. Calvinism (11.8%)
4. Lutheranism (0.60%)
5. Other religions (1.00%)
6. Non-religious (30.1%)
7. Atheists (1.00%)
8. Undeclared (27.5%)

In 2011, it had a population of 36,147 and the population density was 63/km^{2}.

| Year | County population | Change |
|---|---|---|
| 2011 | 36,147 | n/a |

=== Ethnicity ===
Besides the Hungarian majority, the main minorities are the Roma (approx. 1,000) and German (150).

Total population (2011 census): 36,147
Ethnic groups (2011 census): Identified themselves: 31,213 persons:

- Hungarians: 29,687 (95.11%)
- Gypsies: 1,137 (3.64%)
- Others and indefinable: 389 (1.25%)

Approx. 5,000 persons in Kunszentmárton District did not declare their ethnic group at the 2011 census.

=== Religion ===
Religious adherence in the county according to 2011 census:

- Catholic – 10,103 (Roman Catholic – 10,055; Greek Catholic – 48);
- Reformed – 4,281;
- Evangelical – 220;
- other religions – 349;
- Non-religious – 10,888;
- Atheism – 376;
- Undeclared – 9,930.

== Transport ==
=== Road network ===
- The expressway (W→E) goes across the district. Two exits located in Kunszentmárton District: Tiszakürt and Kunszentmárton.
  The road connect Békéscsaba to the highway network.
- Main road (W→E): Kecskemét... – **Kunszentmárton District** (4 municipalities: Tiszakürt, Cserkeszőlő, Kunszetmárton, Öcsöd) – ...Gyula
- Main road (N→S): **Kunszentmárton District** (1 municipality: Kunszentmárton) – ...Hódmezővásárhely
- Main road (N→S): Szolnok... – **Kunszentmárton District** (2 municipalities: Tiszaföldvár, Kunszentmárton)

=== Railway network ===
- Line 130 (N→S): Tiszatenyő (120)... – **Kunszentmárton District** (2 municipalities: Tiszaföldvár, Kunszentmárton) – ...Hódmezővásárhely (135)
- Line 146 (W→E): Kecskemét (140, 142, 152)... – **Kunszentmárton District** (4 municipalities: Tiszasas, Csépa, Szelevény, Kunszentmárton)

== Gallery ==
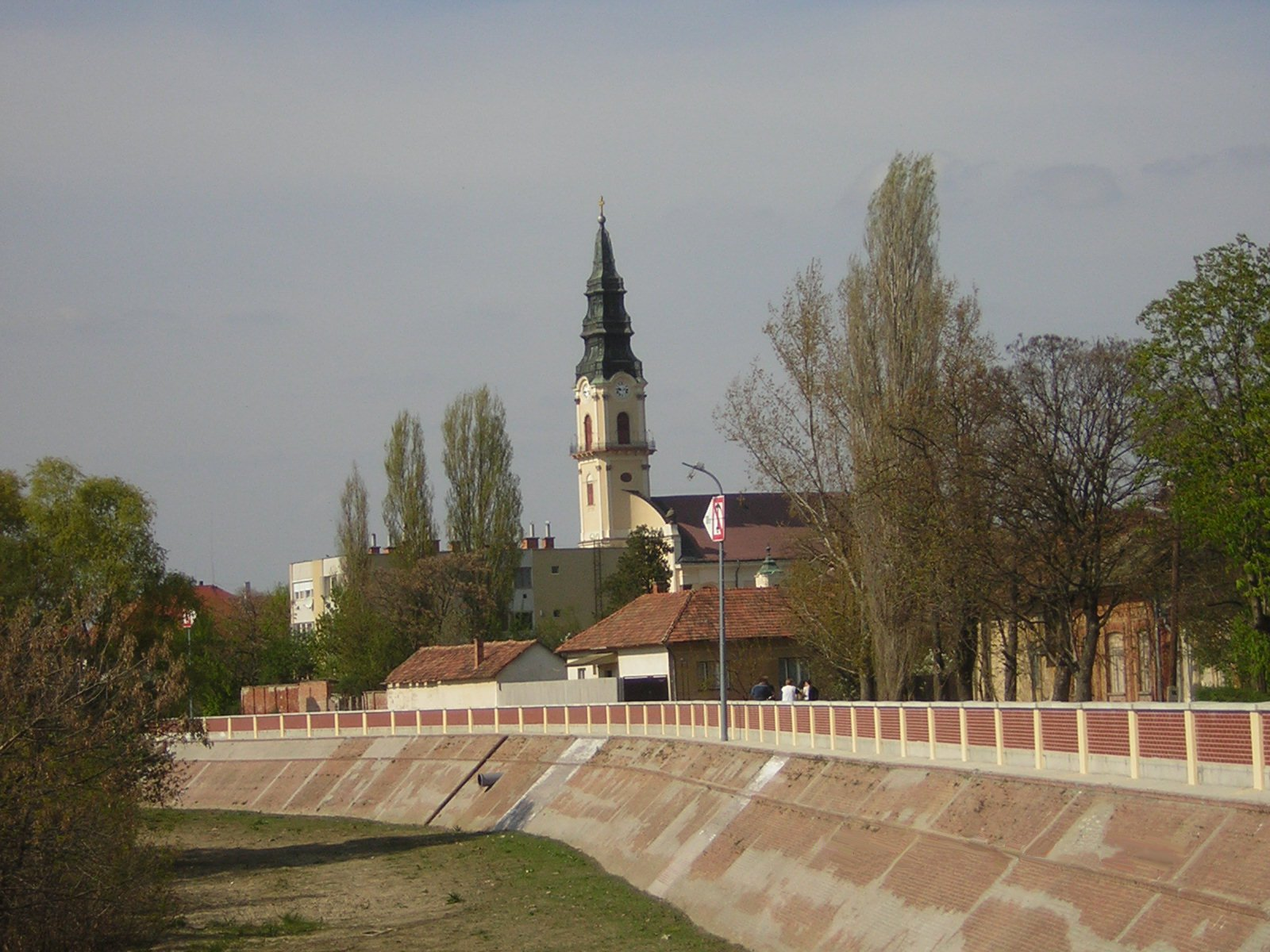
Kunszentmárton, St. Martin Church

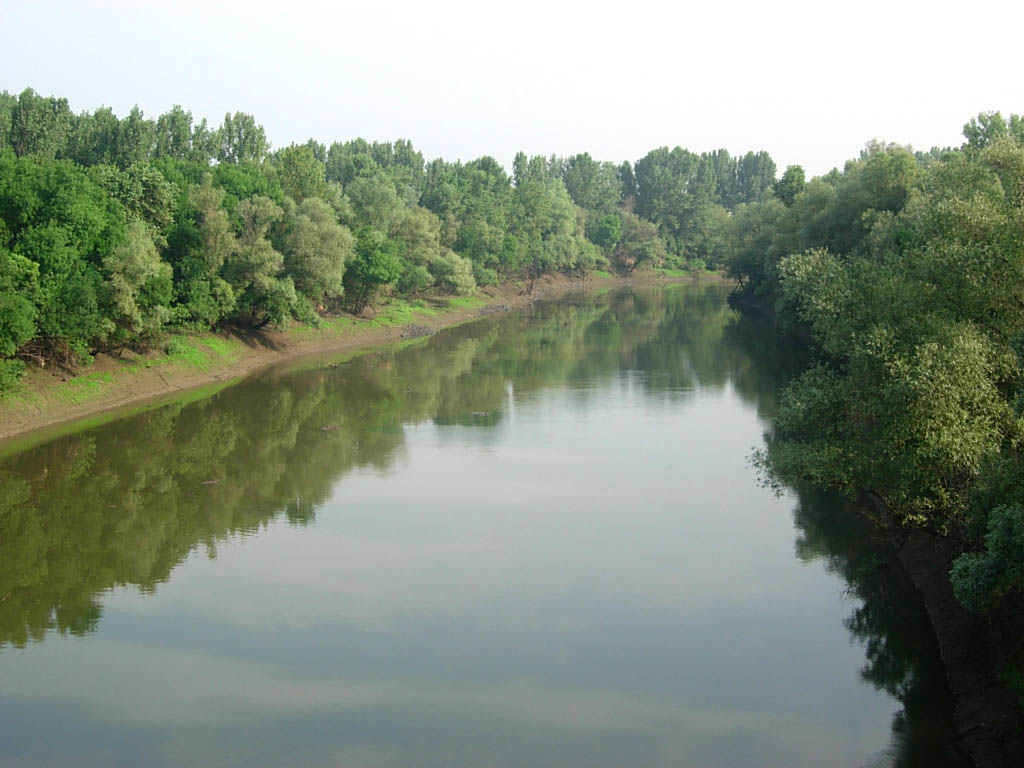
Körös river near Kunszentmárton

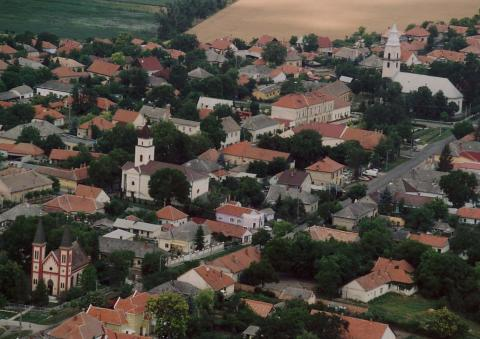
Aerial view of Tiszaföldvár

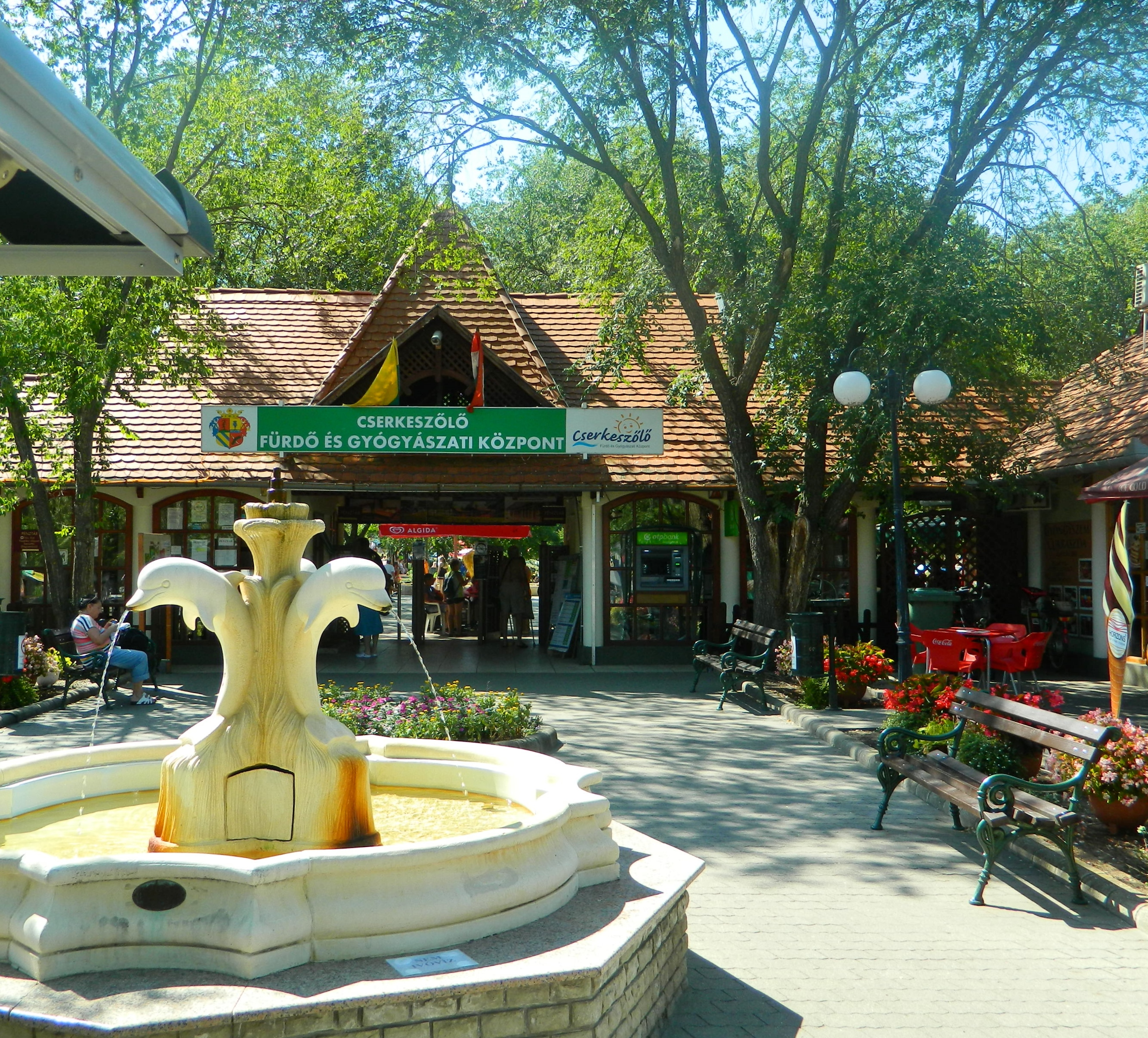
Main entrance of thermal bath in Cserkeszőlő

== See also ==
- List of cities and towns of Hungary
