= Democratic Coalition Party (Hungary) =

Democratic Coalition Party Demokrata Koalíció Párt
- First leader: Zoltán Új
- Last leader: István György
- Founded: 4 August 1990
- Dissolved: 1 September 2001
- Preceded by: Patriotic Electoral Coalition (HVK)
- Ideology: Christian socialism
- Political position: Centre-left

The Democratic Coalition Party (Hungarian: Demokrata Koalíció Párt; DKP) was a centre-left party in Hungary between 1990 and 2001.

== History ==
The DKP was founded in August 1990 as the legal successor of the Patriotic Electoral Coalition (HVK). However, the party tried to distance itself from the predecessor organization. The DKP considered itself as a Christian socialist centre-left party with social democratic values. The party also placed great emphasis on the enforcement of the freedom of the press, while supporting the emergence of private farms but rejected the Independent Smallholders' Party's proposal of re-privatization. The first leader of the party was lawyer Zoltán Új, he was replaced by Sándor Forrai on 18 May 1991. Forrai died in office on 27 April 1992, so he was succeeded by István György. In February 1993, Mihály Hesz and his supporters left the party to re-establish the HVK, however the court did not recognize that step. Hesz was officially excluded from the DKP.

The Democratic Coalition Party contested the 1994 parliamentary election with four individual candidates, who received 0.04 percent of the votes, gaining no seats. The DKP did not contest any further elections, though it nominally continued to exist until its dissolution on 1 September 2001.

== Election results ==
=== National Assembly ===
Election year	National Assembly				Government
Election year	# of overall votes	% of overall vote	# of overall seats won	+/–	Government
1994	2,117	0.04%	0 / 386		extra-parliamentary
