= István Boldog =

Hungarian politician

Member of the National Assembly
- In office 14 May 2010 – 1 May 2022
- Constituency: JN-04
- Majority: 1,928 (3,97%)

Personal details
- Born: 10 November 1966 (age 59) Törökszentmiklós, Hungary
- Party: Fidesz (since 1989)
- Spouse: Magdolna Erzsébet Boldogné Tóth
- Children: 2
- Profession: Politician

István Boldog (born 10 November 1966) is a Hungarian politician, member of the National Assembly (MP) for Mezőtúr (Jász-Nagykun-Szolnok County Constituency VI) from 2010 to 2014, and for Törökszentmiklós (Jász-Nagykun-Szolnok County Constituency IV) from 2014 to 2022. He also served as Mayor of Kétpó between 1994 and 2014.

== Biography ==
Boldog finished his secondary studies at the Dózsa György Secondary School of Agricultural Engineering in Mezőtúr in 1985. After graduating, he started working as a track-watchman at the Pusztapó railway station.

He joined the Szolnok branch of Fidesz in 1989. He became a founding member of the party's local branch in Kétpó in 1990. He was a member of the local representative body of Kétpó from 1992 to 1994. He was elected mayor of the settlement during the 1994 local elections. He was re-elected in 1998, 2002, 2006 and 2010. He was also an external member of the Settlement Development Committee of the Jász-Nagykun-Szolnok County Assembly from 1998 to 2002. He was a member of the Jász-Nagykun-Szolnok County Assembly between 2006 and 2010. Boldog was elected president of the village section of Fidesz in 2007.

Boldog was elected a Member of Parliament for Mezőtúr (Jász-Nagykun-Szolnok County Constituency VI) in the 2010 Hungarian parliamentary election. He was elected MP for Törökszentmiklós in the 2014 and 2018 parliamentary elections. He was a member of the Committee on Consumer Protection from 14 May 2010 to 5 May 2014, and Committee on Budgets from 6 May 2014 to 1 May 2022. He was also vice-chairman of that committee since November 2018.

During his parliamentary activity, Boldog made far-right and anti-LGBT rhetoric several times. He also supported reintroduction of capital punishment in Hungary.

After a high-profile corruption scandal (see below), Boldog decided not to run in the 2022 Hungarian parliamentary election.

== Corruption charge ==
In October 2019, the suspicion arose that Boldog had abused his office since 2017. According to the opposition MP Ákos Hadházy who revealed the case, Boldog enlisted the mayors of the settlements located in his constituency in 2017 and informed them that only those could receive EU development aid by making improvements, who entrust the companies designated by him. Boldog and his accomplices were suspected of building a top-down system in which they could use their power to influence settlements and the outcome of tenders. They could influence which settlements should apply for the subsidies of less than HUF 300 million within the framework of the Regional and Settlement Development Operational Program (TOP) grants, and which companies should be entrusted with the work by the settlements.

At the end of 2019, several people were arrested in the case, including Petra Fehér, Boldog's colleague. On the initiative of the Attorney General Péter Polt, the Parliament voted to suspend the parliamentary immunity of István Boldog on 6 April 2020. On 14 May 2020, the prosecutor's office interrogated István Boldog as a suspect due to a well-founded suspicion of a number of crimes (two conspiracies for inciting an official offense; two conspiracies for inciting a conspiracy offense and two conspirators for inciting an offense in a public procurement procedure) and conducted a house search of his house.

== Personal life ==
He is married. His wife is Magdolna Erzsébet Boldogné Tóth. They have two sons, István and Vajk Nimród.
