= Tiszafüred District =

Coordinates: 47.4833°N 20.7000°E

Tiszafüred District Tiszafüredi járás
- Districts of Hungary
- Coat of arms

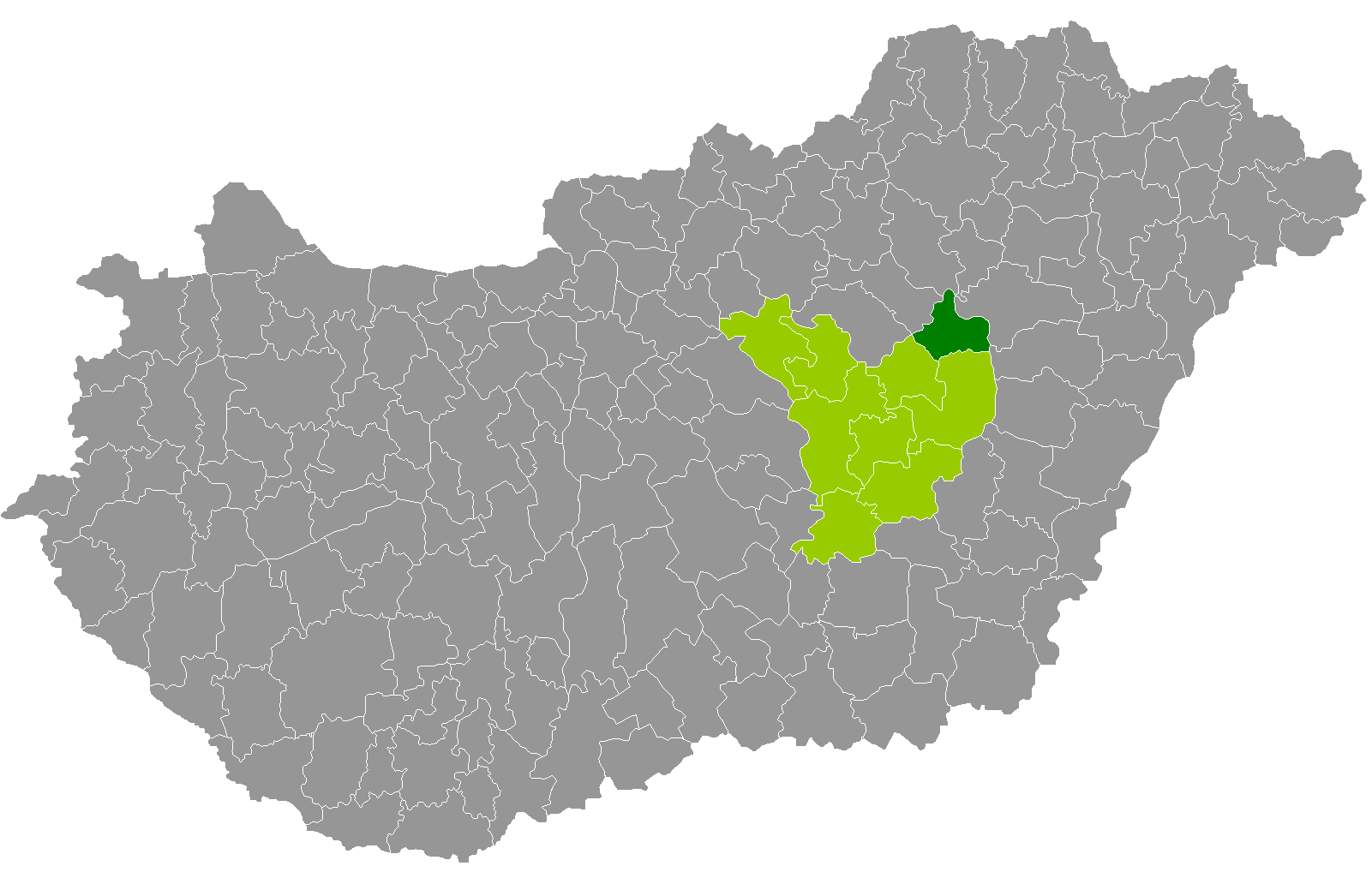
- Tiszafüred District within Hungary and Jász-Nagykun-Szolnok County.
- Country: Hungary
- County: Jász-Nagykun-Szolnok
- District seat: Tiszafüred

Area
  - Total: 417.05 km^{2} (161.02 sq mi)
  - Rank: 9th in Jász-Nagykun-Szolnok

Population (2011 census)
  - Total: 19,559
  - Rank: 9th in Jász-Nagykun-Szolnok
  - Density: 47/km^{2} (120/sq mi)

Tiszafüred (Hungarian: Tiszafüredi járás) is a district in north-eastern part of Jász-Nagykun-Szolnok County. Tiszafüred is also the name of the town where the district seat is found. The district is located in the Northern Great Plain Statistical Region.

== Geography ==
Tiszafüred District borders with Mezőkövesd District (Borsod-Abaúj-Zemplén County) to the north, Balmazújváros District (Hajdú-Bihar County) to the east, Karcag District to the south, Kunhegyes District and Füzesabony District (Heves County) to the west. The number of the inhabited places in Tiszafüred District is 7.

== Municipalities ==
The district has 1 town and 6 villages. (ordered by population, as of 1 January 2012)

- Nagyiván (1,179)
- Tiszaderzs (1,046)
- **Tiszafüred** (10,694) – district seat
- Tiszaigar (813)
- Tiszaörs (1,225)
- Tiszaszentimre (2,086)
- Tiszaszőlős (1,945)

The bolded municipality is the city.

== Demographics ==
Religion in Tiszafüred District (2011 census)
1. Catholic Church (27.2%)
2. Greek Catholicism (0.40%)
3. Calvinism (21.5%)
4. Lutheranism (0.20%)
5. Other religions (1.30%)
6. Non-religious (20.7%)
7. Atheists (0.70%)
8. Undeclared (28.0%)

In 2011, it had a population of 19,559 and the population density was 47/km².

Year	County population	Change
2011	19,559	n/a

=== Ethnicity ===
Besides the Hungarian majority, the main minorities are the Roma (approx. 1,000) and German (200).

Total population (2011 census): 19,559
Ethnic groups (2011 census): Identified themselves: 17,758 persons:

- Hungarians: 16,572 (93.32%)
- Gypsies: 708 (3.99%)
- Germans: 228 (1.28%)
- Others and indefinable: 250 (1.41%)

Approx. 2,000 persons in Tiszafüred District did not declare their ethnic group at the 2011 census.

=== Religion ===
Religious adherence in the county according to 2011 census:

- Catholic – 5,389 (Roman Catholic – 5,318; Greek Catholic – 71);
- Reformed – 4,211;
- Evangelical – 37;
- other religions – 248;
- Non-religious – 4,047;
- Atheism – 145;
- Undeclared – 5,482.

== Gallery ==
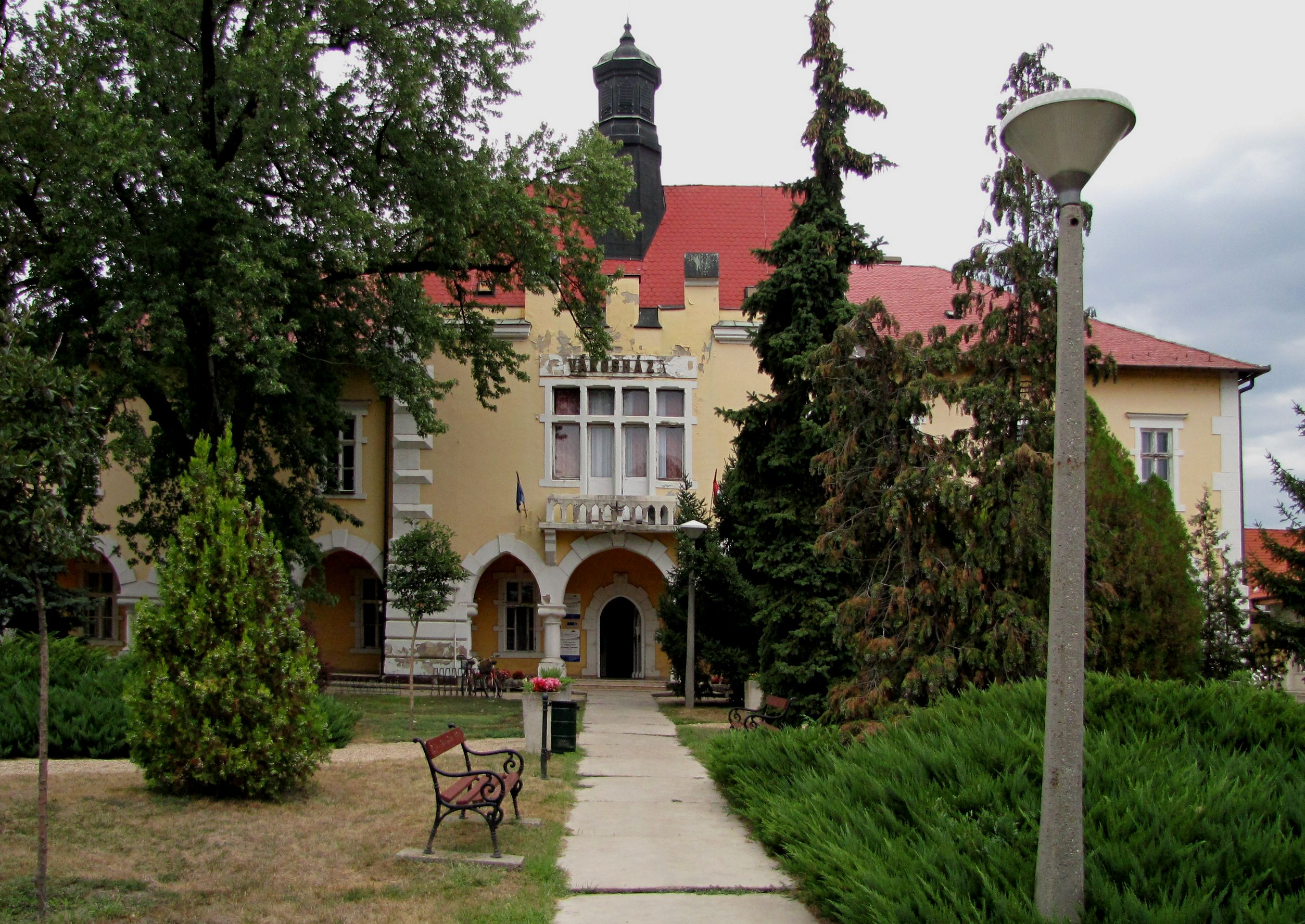
Tiszafüred, Town Hall

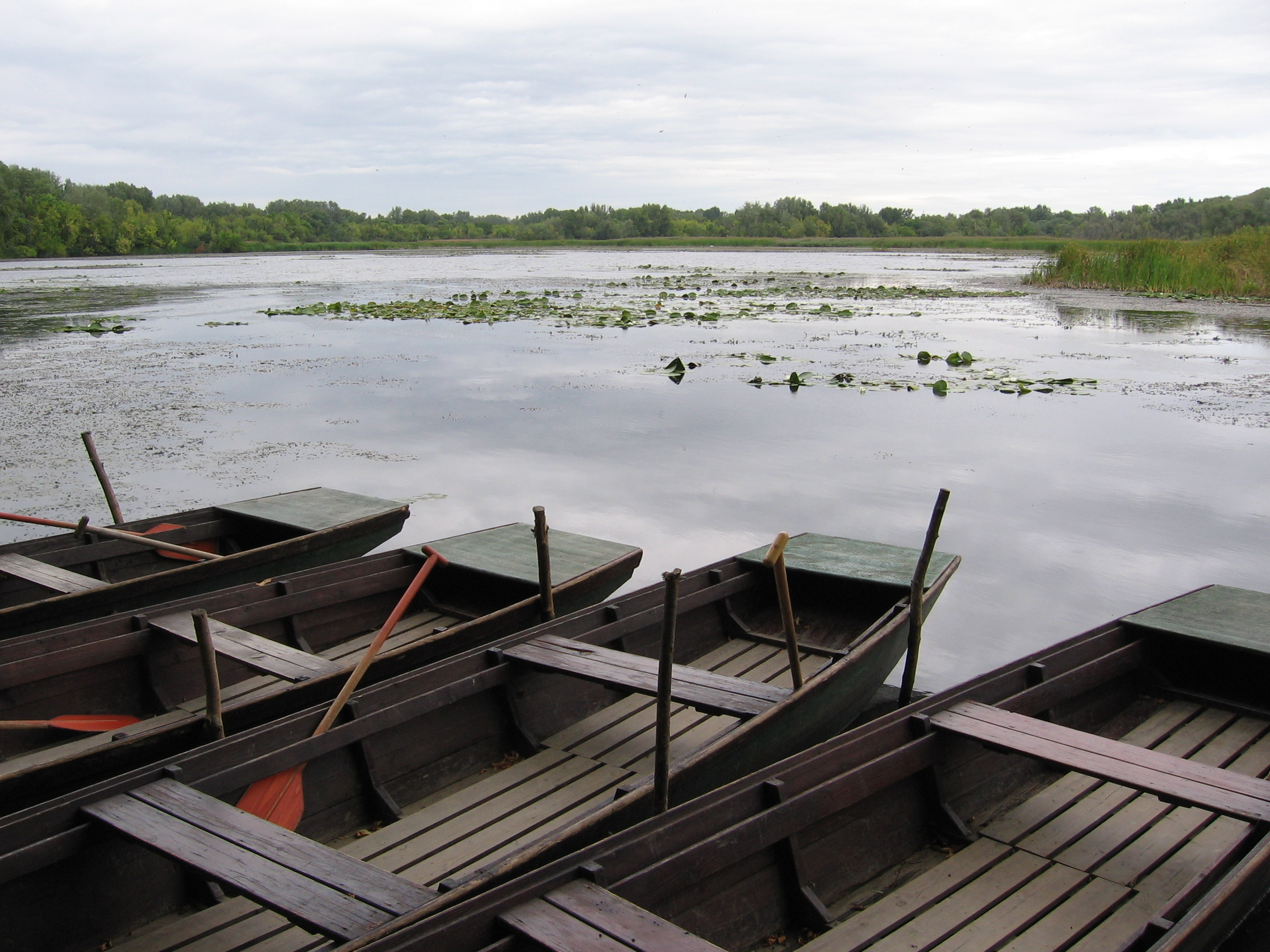
Tisza river in Tiszaörvény

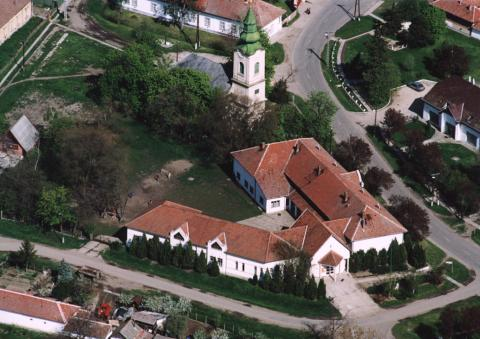
Aerial view of Tiszaderzs

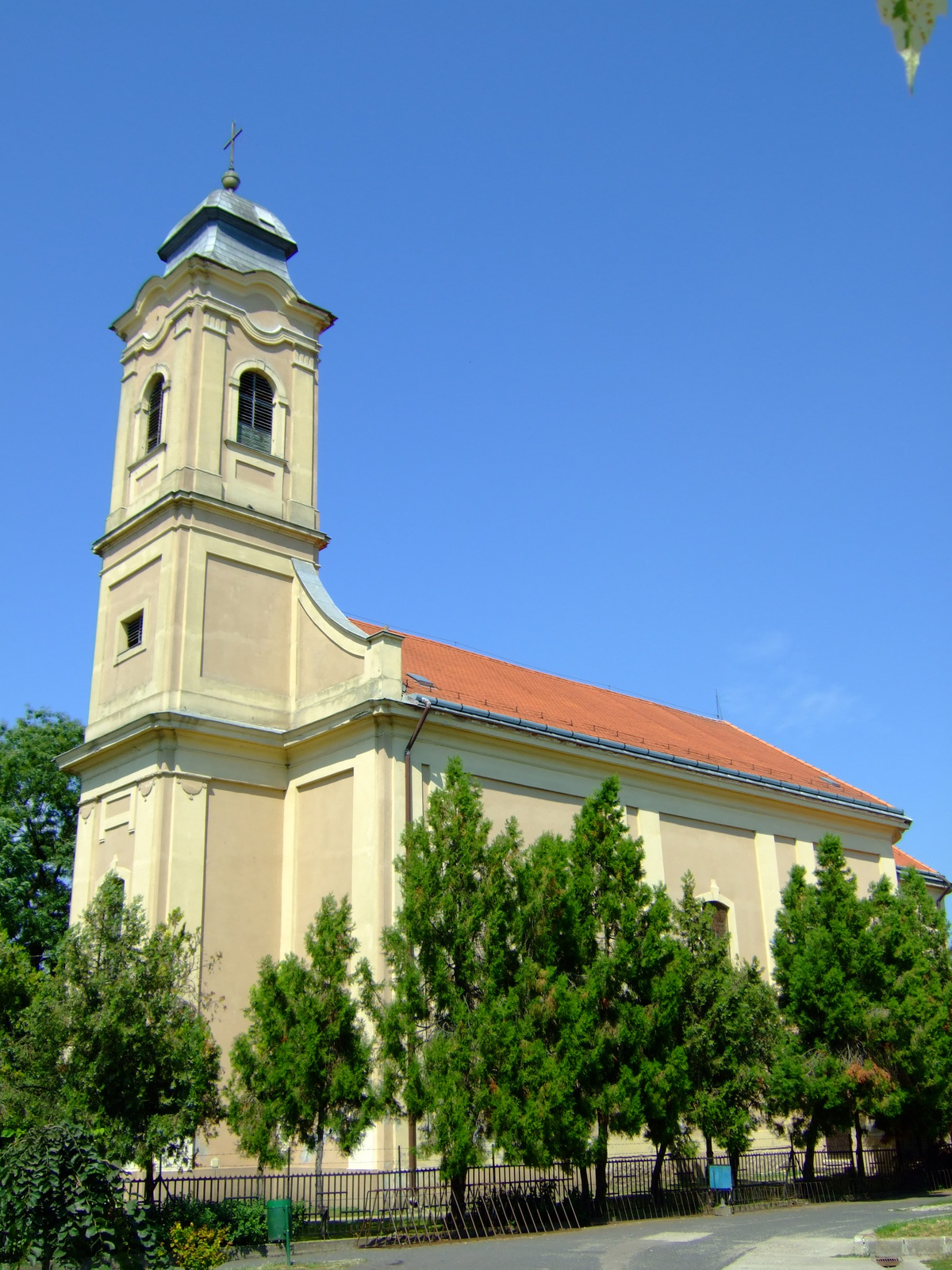
Our Lady of Hungary Church in Tiszafüred

== See also ==
- List of cities and towns of Hungary
