= Tiszafüred =

Town in Hungary

- Town
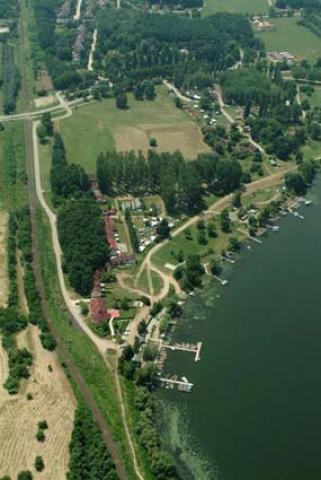
- Aerial view

- Flag Coat of arms

- Location of Tiszafüred
- Coordinates: 47°37′0″N 20°46′0″E
- Country: Hungary
- County: Jász-Nagykun-Szolnok
- District: Tiszafüred

Area
  - Total: 209.97 km^{2} (81.07 sq mi)

Population (2017)
  - Total: 10,872
  - Density: 51.779/km^{2} (134.11/sq mi)
- Time zone: UTC+1 (CET)
  - Summer (DST): UTC+2 (CEST)
- Postal code: 5350
- Area code: (+36) 59
- Website: tiszafured.hu

Tiszafüred is a town in Jász-Nagykun-Szolnok county, in the Northern Great Plain region of central Hungary.

== Geography ==
It covers an area of 209.97 km^{2} (81 sq mi) and has a population of 11,260 people (2015). Tiszafüred is the biggest city of the Lake Tisza region, and it is the capital city of the Lake Tisza. It is a favourite tourist spot and offers many recreational activities such as water skiing, bush walking, and thermal baths.

== Politics ==
The current mayor of Tiszafüred is Imre Újvári (Fidesz-KDNP). A következő polgármester:Bella Rita The local Municipal Assembly, elected at the 2019 local government elections, is made up of 12 members (1 Mayor, 8 Individual constituencies MEPs and 3 Compensation List MEPs) divided into this political parties and alliances:

Party	Seats	Current Municipal Assembly
Fidesz-KDNP	8	M
Mindenki Magyarországa	4	

At the 2026 Hungarian parliamentary election Kovács Sándor (Fidesz-KDNP) was elected as representative of the constituency.

== Notable residents ==
- Krisztián Budovinszky (1976-), footballer
- Anikó Szebenszky (1965-), race walker

== Twin towns – sister cities ==
Tiszafüred is twinned with:

- Chotěboř, Czech Republic
- Płońsk, Poland
- Senta, Serbia
