= Nagyiván =

- Village
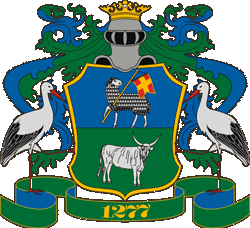
- Coat of arms

- Location within Hungary
- Coordinates: 47°29′14″N 20°55′39″E
- Country: Hungary
- County: Jász-Nagykun-Szolnok
- District: Tiszafüred

Area
  - Total: 43.16 km^{2} (16.66 sq mi)

Population (2015)
  - Total: 1,175
  - Density: 27.2/km^{2} (70/sq mi)
- Time zone: UTC+1 (CET)
  - Summer (DST): UTC+2 (CEST)
- Postal code: 5363
- Area code(s): (+36) 59

Nagyiván is a village in Jász-Nagykun-Szolnok county, in the Northern Great Plain region of central Hungary.

== Geography ==
It covers an area of 43.16 km^{2} (17 sq mi) and has a population of 1,175 people (2015). It is one of the driest area in Hungary. The annual precipitation is about 520 mm. The village lies at the edge of the Hortobágy National Park (the first and biggest Hungarian national park, part of the world heritage). The inhabitants mainly work in the agricultural sector.
