= Tiszasas =

- Village
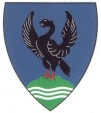
- Coat of arms

- Location within Hungary
- Coordinates: 46°49′23″N 20°04′48″E
- Country: Hungary
- County: Jász-Nagykun-Szolnok
- District: Kunszentmárton

Area
  - Total: 28.79 km^{2} (11.12 sq mi)

Population (2015)
  - Total: 1,023
  - Density: 35.5/km^{2} (92/sq mi)
- Time zone: UTC+1 (CET)
  - Summer (DST): UTC+2 (CEST)
- Postal code: 5474
- Area code(s): (+36) 56

Tiszasas is a village in Jász-Nagykun-Szolnok county, in the Northern Great Plain region of central Hungary. It is near the river Tisza, where people like to go fishing. It has a church near the river. Trains go from Budapest to Tiszasas or from Budapest to Szolnok and from there to Tiszasas. It takes 1 hour and 50 minutes via car from Budapest to Tiszasas.

== History ==
Not much is known about its history. It was first mentioned in the year 1348. According to brief sources, it was first a settlement sometime in 700. In some parts of the village, they believe in an alternate history called the Zalanic mythology. Their beliefs say Zalan I (c. 700–723) was the first "king" of Tiszasas.

== Geography ==
It covers an area of 28.79 km^{2} (11 sq mi) and has a population of 1023 people (2015).

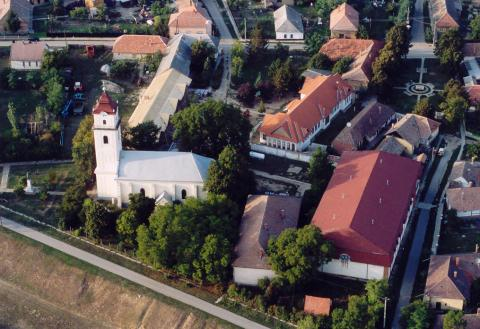
Aerial photography of Tiszasas
