= Csépa =

- Village
- Coat of arms

- Location within Hungary
- Coordinates: 46°48′24″N 20°07′52″E
- Country: Hungary
- County: Jász-Nagykun-Szolnok
- District: Kunszentmárton

Area
  - Total: 29.67 km^{2} (11.46 sq mi)

Population (2015)
  - Total: 1,642
  - Density: 55.3/km^{2} (143/sq mi)
- Time zone: UTC+1 (CET)
  - Summer (DST): UTC+2 (CEST)
- Postal code: 5475
- Area code(s): (+36) 56

Csépa is a village in Jász-Nagykun-Szolnok county, in the Northern Great Plain region of central Hungary.

== Geography ==
It covers an area of 29.67 km^{2} (11 sq mi) and has a population of 1642 people (2015).
