= Cserkeszőlő =

- Village
- Coat of arms

- Location within Hungary
- Coordinates: 46°51′50″N 20°12′20″E
- Country: Hungary
- County: Jász-Nagykun-Szolnok
- District: Kunszentmárton

Area
  - Total: 30.7 km^{2} (11.9 sq mi)

Population (2013)
  - Total: 2,260
  - Density: 73.6/km^{2} (191/sq mi)
- Time zone: UTC+1 (CET)
  - Summer (DST): UTC+2 (CEST)
- Postal code: 5465
- Area code(s): (+36) 56

Cserkeszőlő is a village in Jász-Nagykun-Szolnok county, in the Northern Great Plain region of central Hungary.

Cserkeszőlő is a bath resort in Jász-Nagykun-Szolnok county, in the south part of Northern Great Plains Region. The village lies in the Tiszazug microregion, in the natural environment bordered by the rivers Körös and Tisza. Developing the bath has been the main strategy of the township for decades. As a result, the spa has become well-known not only nationwide but internationally too.

== Geography ==
It covers an area of 30.7 km^{2} (12 sq mi) and has a population of 2,260 people (2013 estimate).

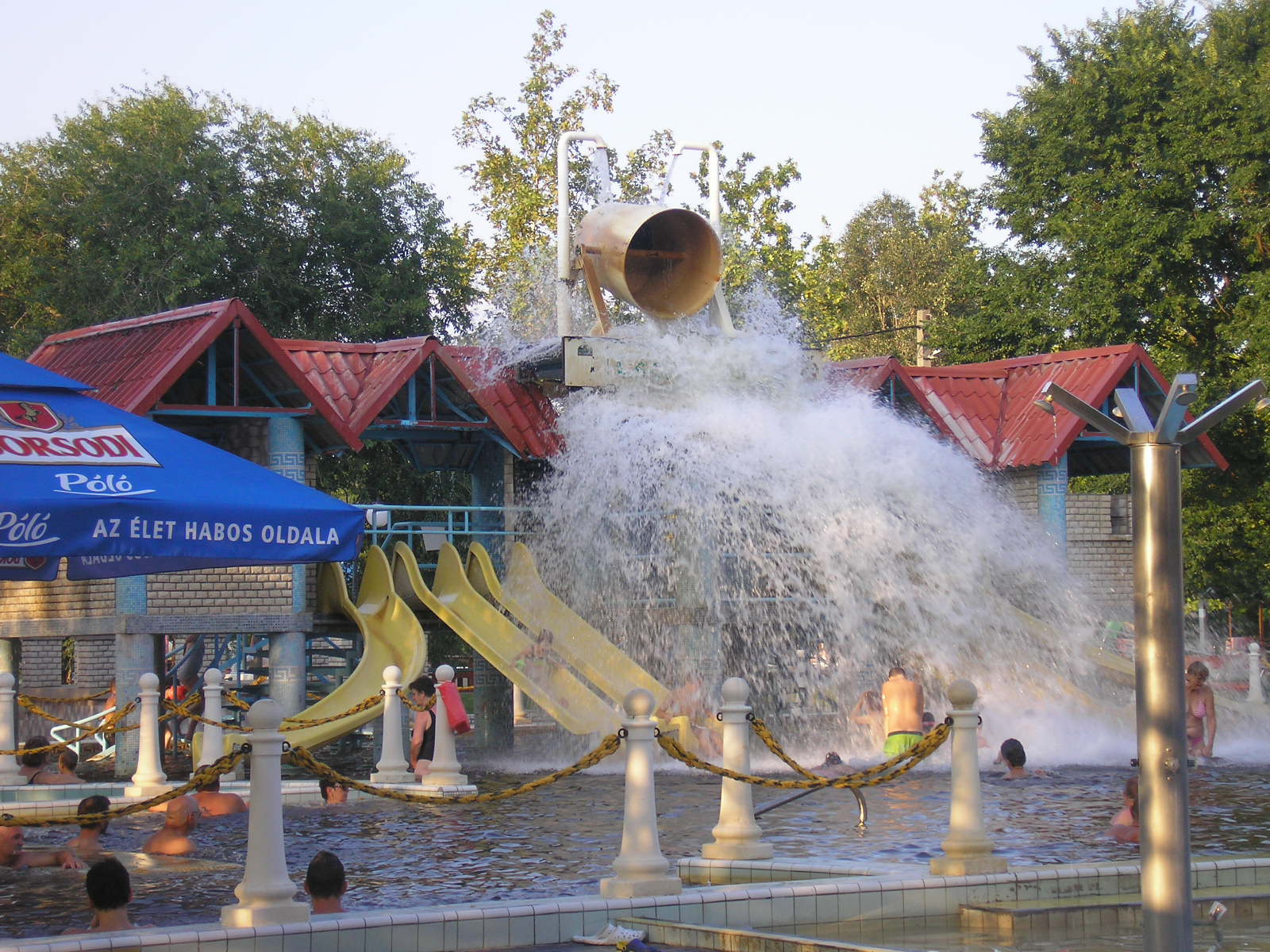
Cserkeszőlő Thermal Spa

== History ==
In 1938, a Hungarian-American oil exploration company discovered a 93 °C (199.4 °F) thermal water source rising from a depth of more than 2,000 metres. The well was closed during the Second World War and reopened to the public in 1948. Locals dug holes in the sand around the flowing thermal water, believing it could relieve their ailments. A clinical study published in 2002 later reported some benefits from bathing in Cserkeszőlő’s thermal water for patients with knee osteoarthritis. The construction of the spa was started in 1954, and underwent significant renovation in 1998. Grape production in the sandy soil has also played a role in the increasing name recognition of Cserkeszőlő.

== Origin of the Name ==
The typical plant of the area („szőlő“ means grapes) is included in the name of Cserkeszőlő as well. While the word "cserke" can be traced back to the Middle Ages, during the rule of King Béla IV, when Jordanian tribes arrived to the present place of the village.

== Sights ==
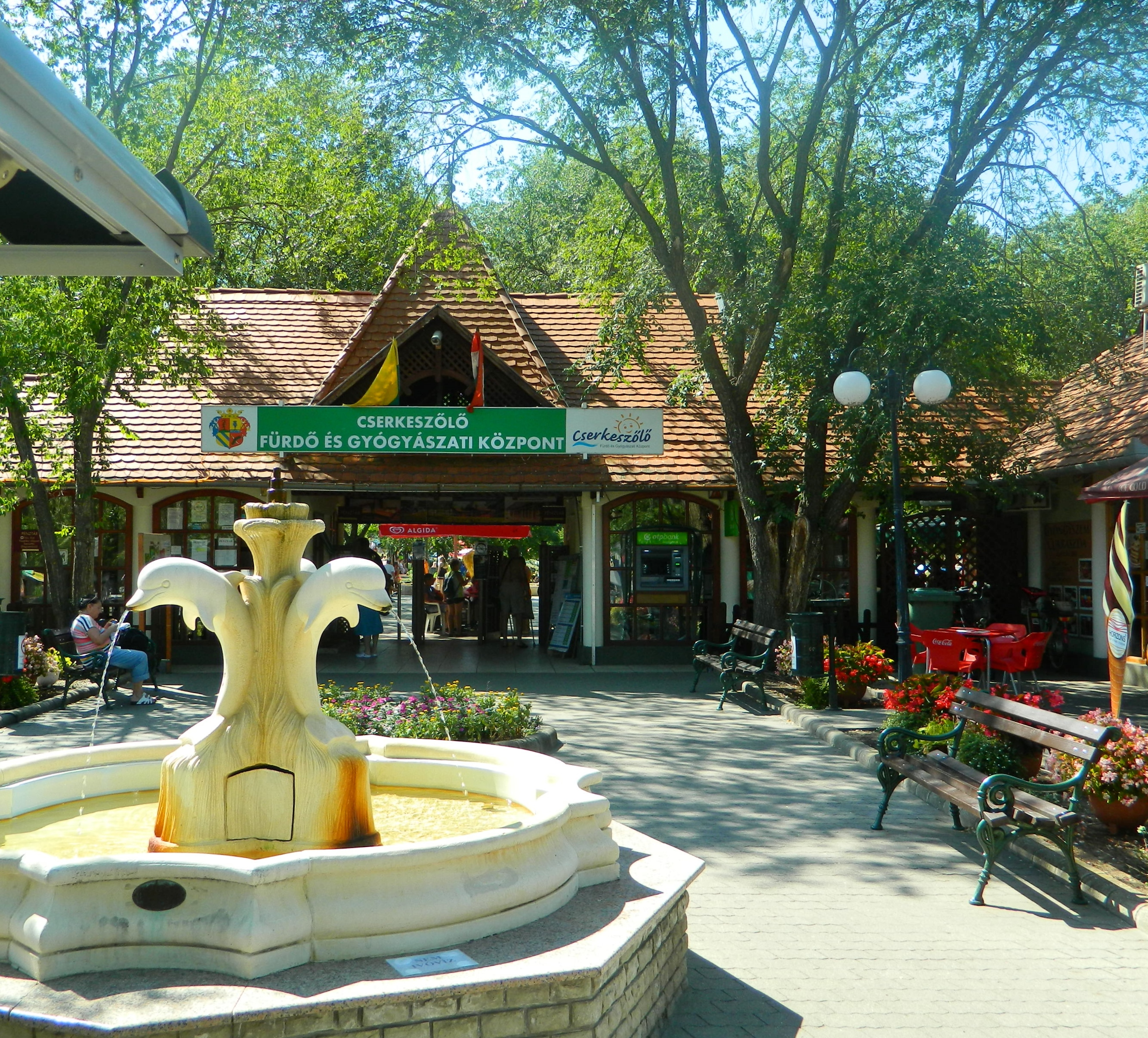
Dolphin well Cserkeszőlő

- Cserkeszőlő Bath and Therapy Center
- Winery and cellar
- Catholic Church
- Calvinist Church

== Population ==
Year	1980	1990	2001	2010	2011	2013
Population	2,199 (census)	2,192 (census)	2,190 (census)	2,098 (estimate)	2,247 (census)	2,260 (estimate)
