= Tiszaigar =

- Village
- Coat of arms

- Location within Hungary
- Coordinates: 47°32′0″N 20°48′0″E
- Country: Hungary
- County: Jász-Nagykun-Szolnok
- District: Tiszafüred

Area
  - Total: 34.02 km^{2} (13.14 sq mi)

Population (2015)
  - Total: 826
  - Density: 24.3/km^{2} (63/sq mi)
- Time zone: UTC+1 (CET)
  - Summer (DST): UTC+2 (CEST)
- Postal code: 5361
- Area code(s): (+36) 59

Tiszaigar is a village in Jász-Nagykun-Szolnok county, in the Northern Great Plain region of central Hungary.

== Geography ==
It covers an area of 34.02 km^{2} (13 sq mi) and has a population of 826 people (2015).
