= Tiszaderzs =

- Village
- Coat of arms

- Location within Hungary
- Coordinates: 47°30′32″N 20°38′28″E
- Country: Hungary
- County: Jász-Nagykun-Szolnok
- District: Tiszafüred

Area
  - Total: 27.19 km^{2} (10.50 sq mi)

Population (2015)
  - Total: 1,051
  - Density: 38.6/km^{2} (100/sq mi)
- Time zone: UTC+1 (CET)
  - Summer (DST): UTC+2 (CEST)
- Postal code: 5243
- Area code(s): (+36) 59

Tiszaderzs is a village in Jász-Nagykun-Szolnok county, in the Northern Great Plain region of central Hungary.

== Geography ==
It covers an area of 27.19 km^{2} (10 sq mi) and has a population of 1051 people (2015).

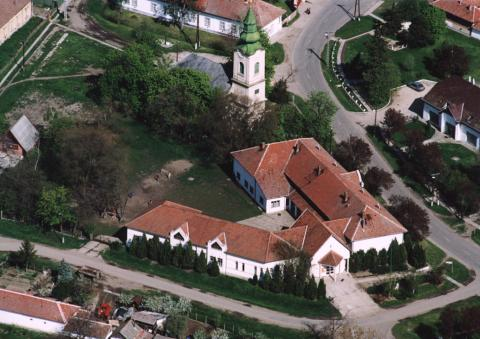
Aerial photography of Tiszaderzs
