= Tiszaszőlős =

- Village
- Coat of arms

- Location within Hungary
- Coordinates: 47°33′35″N 20°43′10″E
- Country: Hungary
- County: Jász-Nagykun-Szolnok
- District: Tiszafüred

Population (2015)
  - Total: 1,616
- Time zone: UTC+1 (CET)
  - Summer (DST): UTC+2 (CEST)
- Postal code: 5244
- Area code(s): (+36) 59

Tiszaszőlős is a village in Jász-Nagykun-Szolnok county, in the Northern Great Plain region of central Hungary.

== Geography ==
It has a population of 1616 people as of (2015).

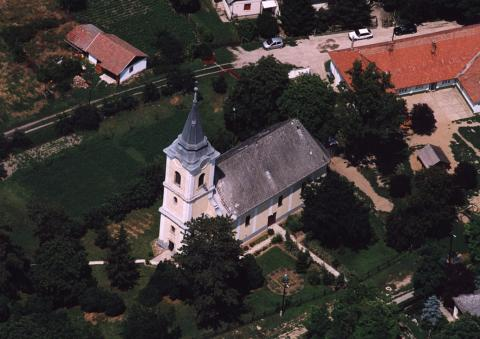
Tiszszőlős - church from above
