= Öcsöd =

- Large village
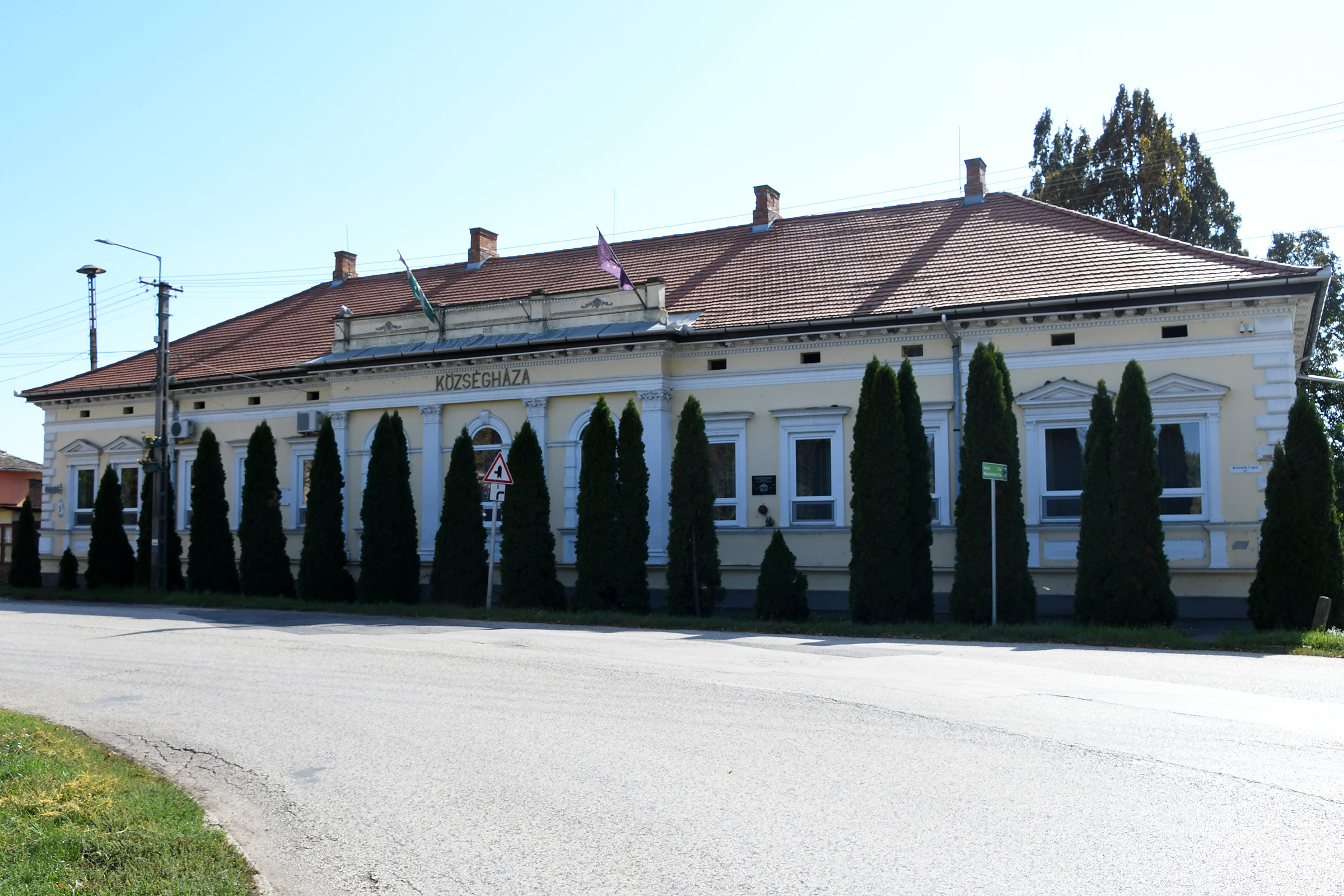
- Village hall

- Coat of arms

- Location within Hungary
- Coordinates: 46°53′59″N 20°23′30″E
- Country: Hungary
- County: Jász-Nagykun-Szolnok
- District: Kunszentmárton

Government
  - Mayor: Attila Soha

Area
  - Total: 103.66 km^{2} (40.02 sq mi)

Population (2010)
  - Total: 3,319
  - Density: 31.96/km^{2} (82.8/sq mi)
- Time zone: UTC+1 (CET)
  - Summer (DST): UTC+2 (CEST)
- Postal code: 5451
- Area code(s): (+36) 56

Öcsöd is a large village in Jász-Nagykun-Szolnok County, in the Northern Great Plain Region of south-east Hungary.

== Geography ==
It covers an area of 54.47 km^{2} and has a population of 3319 people (2010).
