= Tiszaszentimre =

- Village
- Coat of arms

- Location within Hungary
- Coordinates: 47°29′24″N 20°43′30″E
- Country: Hungary
- County: Jász-Nagykun-Szolnok
- District: Tiszafüred

Area
  - Total: 65.61 km^{2} (25.33 sq mi)

Population (2015)
  - Total: 2,095
  - Density: 31.9/km^{2} (83/sq mi)
- Time zone: UTC+1 (CET)
  - Summer (DST): UTC+2 (CEST)
- Postal code: 5222
- Area code(s): (+36) 59

Tiszaszentimre is a village in Jász-Nagykun-Szolnok county, in the Northern Great Plain region of central Hungary.

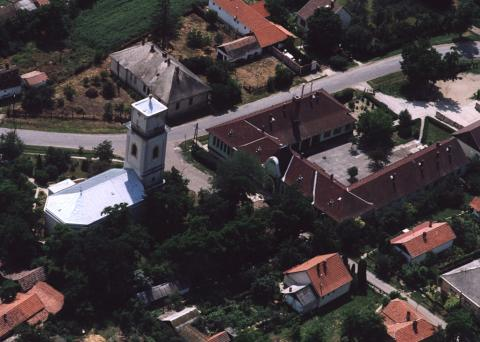
Aerial photography of Tiszaszentimre

== Geography ==
It covers an area of 65.61 km^{2} (25 sq mi) and has a population of 2095 people (2015).
