= Tiszaföldvár =

- Town
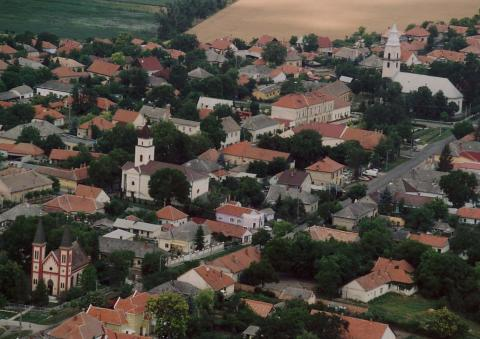
- Aerial view

- Flag Coat of arms

- Location of Tiszaföldvár
- Coordinates: 46°58′26″N 20°15′14″E
- Country: Hungary
- County: Jász-Nagykun-Szolnok
- District: Kunszentmárton

Area
  - Total: 80.34 km^{2} (31.02 sq mi)

Population (2002)
  - Total: 12,027
  - Density: 149.7/km^{2} (387.7/sq mi)
- Time zone: UTC+1 (CET)
  - Summer (DST): UTC+2 (CEST)
- Postal code: 5430
- Area code: (+36) 56
- Website: tiszafoldvar.hu

Tiszaföldvár is a town in Jász-Nagykun-Szolnok county, in the Northern Great Plain region of central Hungary.

== Geography ==
It covers an area of 80.34 km^{2} (31 sq mi) and has a population of 12,027 people (2002).

== Politics ==
The current mayor of Tiszaföldvár is István Hegedűs (Independent).

The local Municipal Assembly, elected at the 2019 local government elections, is made up of 12 members (1 Mayor, 8 Individual constituencies MEPs and 3 Compensation List MEPs) divided into this political parties and alliances:

Party	Seats	Current Municipal Assembly
Fidesz-KDNP	5	
Patriots of Földvár	3	
DK-MSZP	2	
Independent	2	M

== Twin towns – sister cities ==
Tiszaföldvár is twinned with:

- Bačko Gradište (Bečej), Serbia (2006)
- Gräfenberg, Germany (2003)
- Hérimoncourt, France (2004)
- Mielec, Poland (2006)

Tiszaföldvár also cooperates with other Hungarian municipalities with "földvár" in their names: Balatonföldvár, Dunaföldvár and Pusztaföldvár.

== Gallery ==
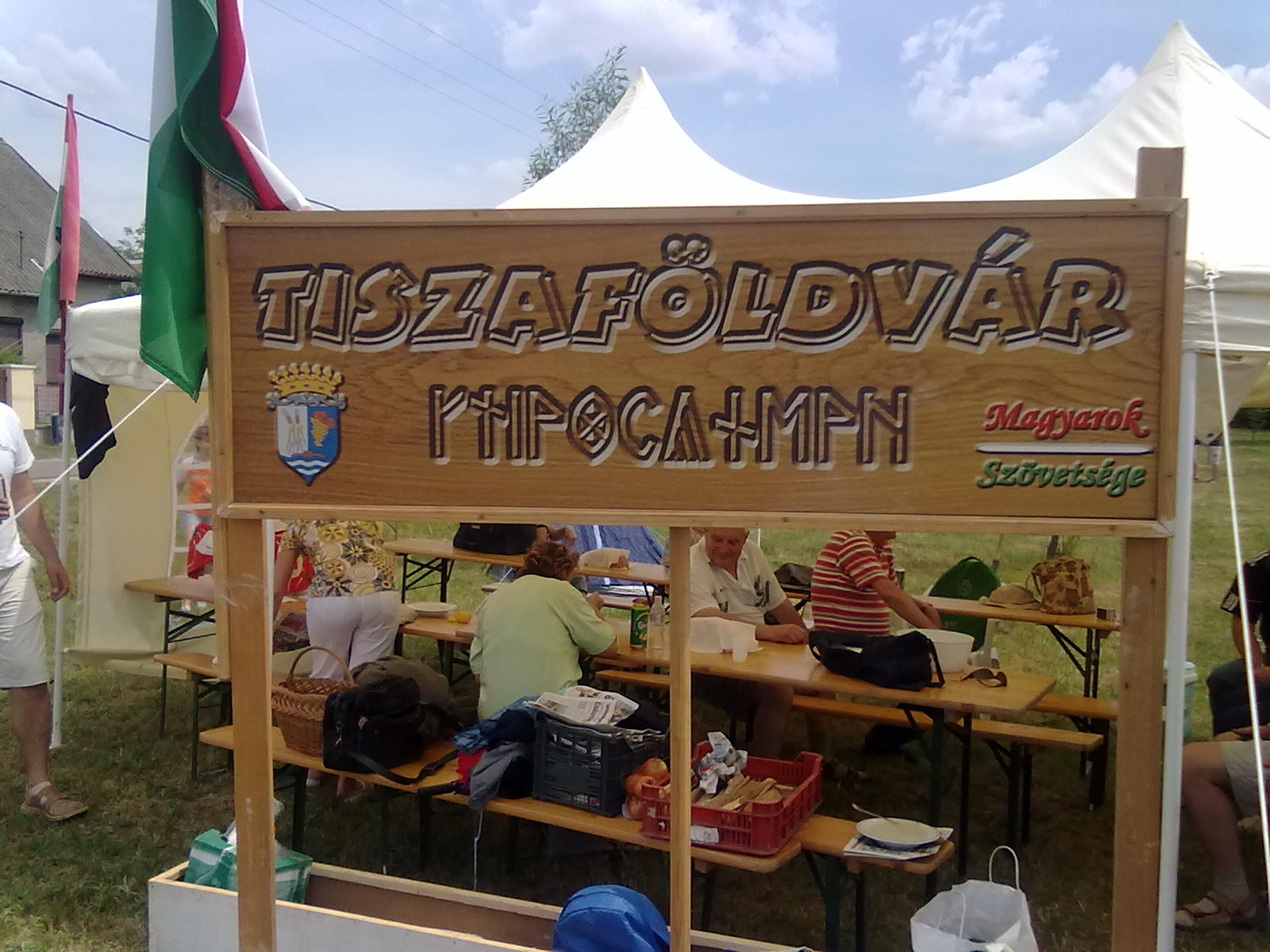
Tiszaföldvár name written in both Szekely-Hungarian script (bottom) and Latin letters (top)
