= István Sági =

Hungarian politician (born 1967)

Member of the National Assembly
- In office 14 May 2010 – 5 May 2014

Personal details
- Born: 16 December 1967 (age 58) Heves, Hungary
- Party: Fidesz
- Profession: politician

István Sági (born 16 December 1967) is a Hungarian politician, member of the National Assembly (MP) for Kunszentmárton (Jász-Nagykun-Szolnok County Constituency V) between 2010 and 2014.

He was elected member of the Committee on Education, Science and Research on 14 May 2010.
