= Tiszainoka =

- Village
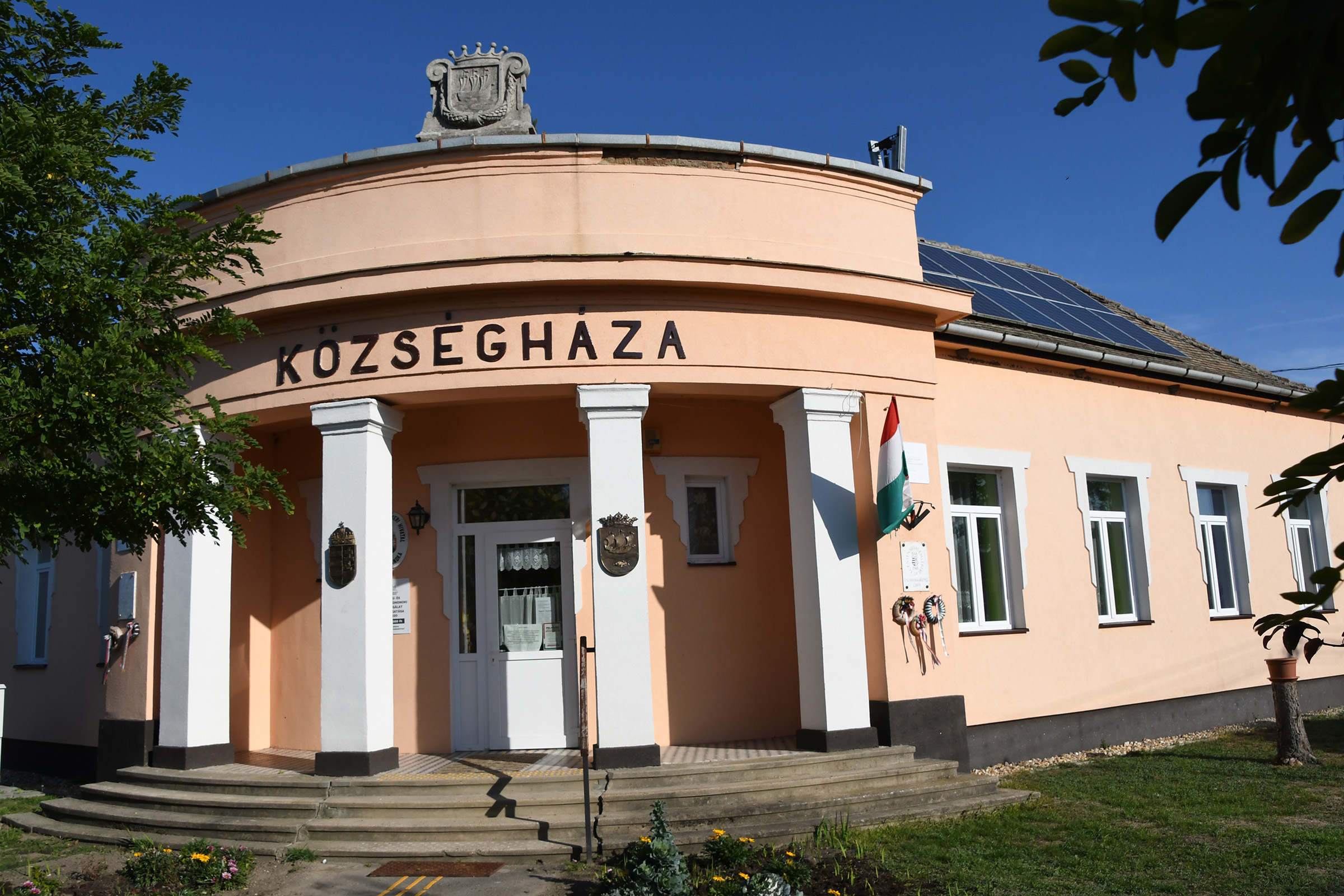
- Village hall

- Coat of arms

- Location within Hungary
- Coordinates: 46°54′14″N 20°09′07″E
- Country: Hungary
- County: Jász-Nagykun-Szolnok
- District: Kunszentmárton

Area
  - Total: 17.92 km^{2} (6.92 sq mi)

Population (2010)
  - Total: 397
  - Density: 22.89/km^{2} (59.3/sq mi)
- Time zone: UTC+1 (CET)
  - Summer (DST): UTC+2 (CEST)
- Postal code: 5464
- Area code(s): (+36) 56

Tiszainoka is a village in Jász-Nagykun-Szolnok county, in the Northern Great Plain region of central Hungary. Tiszainoka is a historic settlement region that dates back to the middle ages.

== Geography ==
It covers an area of 17.92 km^{2} (7 sq mi) and has a population of 397 people (2026).
