= Endre Rózsa =

Endre Rózsa (30 October 1941, Pécs, Hungary – 18 April 1995, Budapest) was an Attila József and Gábor Bethlen award-winning poet and poet laureate. He was one of the nine members of the Kilencek group of notable Hungarian poets.

== Poetry books ==
- 1970: Kavicsszüret
- 1974: Senki ideje
- 1979: Kietlen ünnep
- 1985: Sárkányeregető (gyerekversek)
- 1987: Az anyag emlékezete
- 1989: Szomjúság örökmécsei
- 1993: Árnyékszobrok (válogatott és új versek)
- 1998: Az ámokfutó álmai (hátrahagyott versek)

== Achievements ==
- 1979: Atilla József award
- 1994: Magyar Köztársaság Érdemrend Középkeresztje a Kilenceknek
- 2009: Bethlen Gábor-díj a Kilenceknek (posztumusz)
