= László György Lukács =

Hungarian lawyer and politician

László György Lukács (born 7 March 1983 in Karcag), is a Hungarian lawyer, politician, since 2014 a member of Hungarian National Assembly, vice-president of Jobbik.

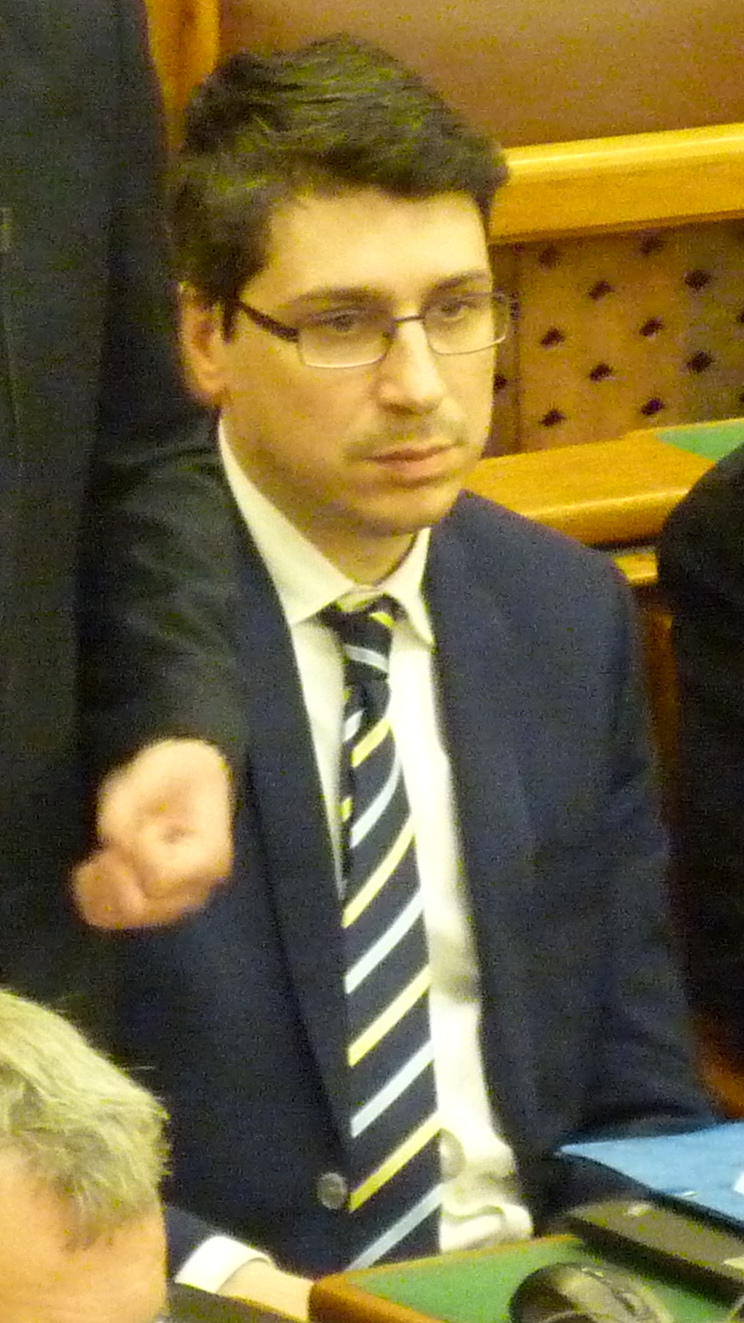
Lukács in 2016

== Early life ==
Between 1995 and 2002, he was student in Gábor Áron High School in Karcag and between 2000 and 2001, he was a student at Lebanon High School in Virginia. He graduated from the Faculty of Law of the Eötvös Loránd University. He speaks German and English as well.

== Political career ==
In 2010, he was the mayoral candidate for Karcag in the 2010 municipal elections. He got 21% of the votes, finishing second. He was Jobbik's MP candidate in Constituency III. of Jász-Nagykun-Szolnok County at the 2018 Hungarian national elections. He got 32,92% of votes, finishing second. Between 2010 and 2014 he was a Member of City Assembly in Karcag. Since 2014 member of Hungarian National Assembly. He deals with health service in the National Assembly. On 25 January 2020, he was elected for vice-president in Jobbik.

He lives in Karcag with his wife and two children.
