= Mária Kállai =

Hungarian politician

Member of the National Assembly
- In office 8 May 2018 – 8 May 2026

Personal details
- Born: 5 December 1957 (age 68) Szolnok, Hungary
- Party: Fidesz

Mária Kállai (born in Szolnok, Hungary on 5 December 1957) is a Hungarian public education leader, lecturer and politician. She is a member of National Assembly of Hungary (Országgyűlés) from 2018 to 2026. She is a member of Fidesz.

== Early life and career ==
She attended Ferenc Verseghy High School in Szolnok and finished in 1976. In 1980, she graduated from the Eszterházy Károly Catholic University. In 1988, she graduated as a lecturer in pedagogy at the Faculty of Arts in Eötvös Loránd University. In 1999, she graduated from Janus Pannonius University with a degree in public education. She obtained his PhD degree in Budapest in 2002 in the field of education research and sports sciences.

Between 1980 and 12 October 2006, she worked for the Szandaszőlős Primary School where she served as the teacher and was promoted to deputy principal. She taught at the Kodolányi János University in Székesfehérvár as an associate professor.

Between 2006 and 2012 she was the Deputy Mayor of Szolnok. On 1 October 2012 she became a government representative of the Jász-Nagykun-Szolnok County government office. In 2018 during the general elections of Hungary, she was elected member of parliament in the National Assembly of Hungary. She was the vice-chairperson of the Cultural Committee from 2018 to 2026. Since 25 June 2018 she has been the chairperson of the subcommittee on the implementation, social and economic impact of deregulation and deregulation processes of the Committee on Culture. She was replaced as individual candidate for Szolnok by the Fidesz presidium for the 2026 Hungarian parliamentary election. Although her name appeared in her party's national list, she did not secure a mandate.
