= Szelevény =

- Village
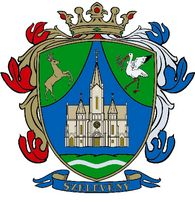
- Coat of arms

- Location within Hungary
- Coordinates: 46°48′07″N 20°12′04″E
- Country: Hungary
- County: Jász-Nagykun-Szolnok
- District: Kunszentmárton

Area
  - Total: 45.39 km^{2} (17.53 sq mi)

Population (2015)
  - Total: 1,086
  - Density: 23.9/km^{2} (62/sq mi)
- Time zone: UTC+1 (CET)
  - Summer (DST): UTC+2 (CEST)
- Postal code: 5476
- Area code(s): (+36) 56

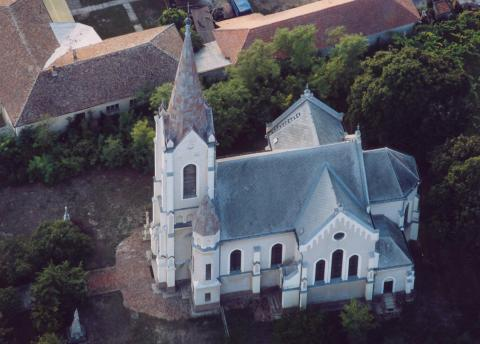
Aerial photography of a church in Szelevény

Szelevény is a village in Jász-Nagykun-Szolnok county, in the Northern Great Plain region of central Hungary.

== Geography ==
It covers an area of 45.39 km^{2} (18 sq mi) and has a population of 1086 people (2015).
