= Imre Iváncsik =

Hungarian food engineer and politician

Member of the National Assembly
- In office 28 June 1994 – 5 May 2014

Personal details
- Born: 29 June 1956 (age 69) Újszász, Hungary
- Party: MSZMP (1976–89); MSZP (since 1989)
- Other political affiliations: KISZ (1972–89)
- Profession: food engineer, politician

Imre Iváncsik (born 29 June 1956) is a Hungarian food engineer and politician, member of the National Assembly (MP) for Szolnok from 1994 to 2002 (Jász-Nagykun-Szolnok County Constituency III) and from 2006 to 2010 (Constituency IV). He was also a Member of Parliament from the national list of the Hungarian Socialist Party (MSZP) from 2002 to 2006 and from 2010 to 2014. He served as Secretary of State for Defence between 2002 and 2007.

He is a member of the Hungarian Mycological Society since 1989.

== Career ==
Iváncsik was born in Újszász on 29 June 1956. He finished his secondary studies in Debrecen, then attended the College of Food Technology in Szeged. He joined Hungarian Young Communist League (KISZ) in 1972; he chaired its central committee in Kisújszállás (1981–82); secretary (1982–85) then first secretary (1985–89) of the Jász-Nagykun-Szolnok County branch. He served as Secretary of the local county branch of the Hungarian Socialist Workers' Party (MSZMP) for a few months in 1989. During the "regime change", he became a founding member of the Hungarian Socialist Party (MSZP) and was elected to the national board. He became the chairman of its branch in Szolnok, serving in this capacity from 1991 to 1995. Currently he is the chairman of the Jász-Nagykun-Szolnok County branch.

He participated in the 1990 parliamentary election, but did not gain a mandate. He was elected MP four years later, representing Szolnok. In the autumn municipal election, he became a member of the Jász-Nagykun-Szolnok County General Assembly, where he was elected President (serving in this capacity until 1998). Iváncsik worked in the Defence Committee from 1994 to 1996 and from 1998 to 2002. He was an observer in the Assembly of the Western European Union from 1995 to 1996. Iváncsik was re-elected MP in the 1998 parliamentary election; he became a member of the Regional Development Committee too.

Following the Socialists' victory at the 2002 parliamentary election, Iváncsik was appointed Secretary of State for Defence, serving under minister Ferenc Juhász. He held the position until 30 June 2007, when he was replaced by Ágnes Vadai. In the same time, Iváncsik became assistant secretary of state to György Szilvásy, who served as Minister without portfolio for Civilian Intelligence Services. He functioned in this capacity until the 2010 parliamentary election, when MSZP lost. Iváncsik secured a parliamentary seat from his party's national list and was elected vice-chairman of the Defense and Law Enforcement Committee. He unsuccessfully ran for individual seat in Szolnok during the 2014 parliamentary election, but was defeated by Ildikó Bene (Fidesz). Consequently, he lost his mandate after 20 years.
