= Ildikó Bene =

Hungarian politician

Member of the National Assembly
- In office 14 May 2010 – 7 May 2018

Personal details
- Born: 21 August 1962 (age 63) Szolnok, Hungary
- Party: Fidesz (since 2000)
- Spouse: Csaba Jánosi
- Children: Zsolt; Mihály
- Profession: physician

Dr. Ildikó Bene (formerly Dr. Ildikó Jánosi-Bene; born 21 August 1962) is a Hungarian physician, internist and politician, member of the National Assembly (MP) for Szolnok (Jász-Nagykun-Szolnok County Constituency IV then I) between 2010 and 2018. She was a member of the Committee on Youth, Social, Family, and Housing Affairs and Committee on Health since 14 May 2010. Bene also served as Deputy Chairman of the Committee on Health since 14 February 2011. She was vice-chairperson of the Welfare Committee from 2014 to 2018

She was Director General of the Hetényi Géza Hospital of Jász-Nagykun-Szolnok County from 2010 to 2014.

== Personal life ==
She is married to Csaba Jánosi. They have two sons, Zsolt and Mihály.
