= Patriotic Electoral Coalition =

Patriotic Electoral Coalition Hazafias Választási Koalíció
- Chairman: László Asztalos
- Founded: 21 December 1989
- Dissolved: 4 August 1990
- Preceded by: Patriotic People's Front (HNF)
- Succeeded by: Democratic Coalition Party (DKP)
- Newspaper: Első Kézből
- Ideology: Democratic socialism
- Political position: Left-wing

The Patriotic Electoral Coalition (Hungarian: Hazafias Választási Koalíció; HVK) was a short-lived electoral coalition in Hungary, formed in December 1989 by the Patriotic People's Front (HNF) and twelve other minor left-wing parties and civil movements to jointly contest the 1990 parliamentary election, the first completely free and competitive elections to be held in the country since 1945 after the fall of communism.

During the campaign, incumbent Minister of Justice Kálmán Kulcsár became head of the coalition's national list. Following the failure parliamentary election, the national congress of the Patriotic Electoral Coalition declared its disestablishment on 4 August 1990. Following that some members of the HVK decided to found the Democratic Coalition Party (DKP).

== Election results ==
=== National Assembly ===
Election year	National Assembly				Government
Election year	# of overall votes	% of overall vote	# of overall seats won	+/–	Government
1990	91,910	1.87%	0 / 386		extra-parliamentary

== Sources ==
- Vida, István (2011). "Hazafias Választási Koalíció (HVK)". Magyarországi politikai pártok lexikona (1846–2010) [Encyclopedia of the Political Parties in Hungary (1846–2010)] (in Hungarian). Gondolat Kiadó. pp. 361–362. ISBN 978-963-693-276-3.
