= List of constituencies of Hungary =

Under the Hungarian mixed majoriarian system of election, the National Assembly has 106 constituencies (Országgyűlési egyéni választókerületek, OEVK, electoral districts), each of which elects one member of the National Assembly by first-past-the-post voting (a plurality of votes). At least 106 more representatives are elected from closed lists in each of Hungarian Counties, distributed in a manner that ensures that the overall proportion of representatives for each party is approximately equal to the proportion of votes its list received.

Voting was last held in Hungarian constituencies on 12 April 2026, determining the members of the National Assembly of Hungary (2026–2030).

Constituencies in Hungary.

== List of seats by County ==
=== Budapest ===
18 constituencies:

- 1st constituency of Budapest
- 2nd constituency of Budapest
- 3rd constituency of Budapest
- 4th constituency of Budapest
- 5th constituency of Budapest
- 6th constituency of Budapest
- 7th constituency of Budapest
- 8th constituency of Budapest
- 9th constituency of Budapest
- 10th constituency of Budapest
- 11th constituency of Budapest
- 12th constituency of Budapest
- 13th constituency of Budapest
- 14th constituency of Budapest
- 15th constituency of Budapest
- 16th constituency of Budapest
- 17th constituency of Budapest (until 2026)
- 18th constituency of Budapest (until 2026)

=== Bács-Kiskun ===
6 constituencies:

- 1st constituency of Bács-Kiskun County
- 2nd constituency of Bács-Kiskun County
- 3rd constituency of Bács-Kiskun County
- 4th constituency of Bács-Kiskun County
- 5th constituency of Bács-Kiskun County
- 6th constituency of Bács-Kiskun County

=== Baranya ===
4 constituencies:

- 1st constituency of Baranya County
- 2nd constituency of Baranya County
- 3rd constituency of Baranya County
- 4th constituency of Baranya County

=== Békés ===
4 constituencsies:

- 1st constituency of Békés County
- 2nd constituency of Békés County
- 3rd constituency of Békés County
- 4th constituency of Békés County

=== Borsod-Abaúj-Zemplén ===
7 constituencies:

- 1st constituency of Borsod-Abaúj-Zemplén County
- 2nd constituency of Borsod-Abaúj-Zemplén County
- 3rd constituency of Borsod-Abaúj-Zemplén County
- 4th constituency of Borsod-Abaúj-Zemplén County
- 5th constituency of Borsod-Abaúj-Zemplén County
- 6th constituency of Borsod-Abaúj-Zemplén County
- 7th constituency of Borsod-Abaúj-Zemplén County

=== Csongrád-Csanád ===
4 constituencies:

- 1st constituency of Csongrád-Csanád County
- 2nd constituency of Csongrád-Csanád County
- 3rd constituency of Csongrád-Csanád County
- 4th constituency of Csongrád-Csanád County

=== Fejér ===
5 constituencies:

- 1st constituency of Fejér County
- 2nd constituency of Fejér County
- 3rd constituency of Fejér County
- 4th constituency of Fejér County
- 5th constituency of Fejér County

=== Győr-Moson-Sopron ===
5 constituencies:

- 1st constituency of Győr-Moson-Sopron County
- 2nd constituency of Győr-Moson-Sopron County
- 3rd constituency of Győr-Moson-Sopron County
- 4th constituency of Győr-Moson-Sopron County
- 5th constituency of Győr-Moson-Sopron County

=== Hajdú-Bihar ===
6 constituencies:

- 1st constituency of Hajdú-Bihar County
- 2nd constituency of Hajdú-Bihar County
- 3rd constituency of Hajdú-Bihar County
- 4th constituency of Hajdú-Bihar County
- 5th constituency of Hajdú-Bihar County
- 6th constituency of Hajdú-Bihar County

=== Heves ===
3 constituencies:

- 1st constituency of Heves County
- 2nd constituency of Heves County
- 3rd constituency of Heves County

=== Jász-Nagykun-Szolnok ===
4 constituencies:

- 1st constituency of Jász-Nagykun-Szolnok County
- 2nd constituency of Jász-Nagykun-Szolnok County
- 3rd constituency of Jász-Nagykun-Szolnok County
- 4th constituency of Jász-Nagykun-Szolnok County

=== Komárom-Esztergom ===
3 constituencies:

- 1st constituency of Komárom-Esztergom County
- 2nd constituency of Komárom-Esztergom County
- 3rd constituency of Komárom-Esztergom County

=== Nógrád ===
2 constituencies:

- 1st constituency of Nógrád County
- 2nd constituency of Nógrád County

=== Pest ===
12 constituencies:

- 1st constituency of Pest County
- 2nd constituency of Pest County
- 3rd constituency of Pest County
- 4th constituency of Pest County
- 5th constituency of Pest County
- 6th constituency of Pest County
- 7th constituency of Pest County
- 8th constituency of Pest County
- 9th constituency of Pest County
- 10th constituency of Pest County
- 11th constituency of Pest County
- 12th constituency of Pest County
- 13th constituency of Pest County (since 2026)
- 14th constituency of Pest County (since 2026)

=== Somogy ===
4 constituencies:

- 1st constituency of Somogy County
- 2nd constituency of Somogy County
- 3rd constituency of Somogy County
- 4th constituency of Somogy County

=== Szabolcs-Szatmár-Bereg ===
6 constituencies:

- 1st constituency of Szabolcs-Szatmár-Bereg County
- 2nd constituency of Szabolcs-Szatmár-Bereg County
- 3rd constituency of Szabolcs-Szatmár-Bereg County
- 4th constituency of Szabolcs-Szatmár-Bereg County
- 5th constituency of Szabolcs-Szatmár-Bereg County
- 6th constituency of Szabolcs-Szatmár-Bereg County

=== Tolna ===
3 constituencies:

- 1st constituency of Tolna County
- 2nd constituency of Tolna County
- 3rd constituency of Tolna County

=== Vas ===
3 constituencies:

- 1st constituency of Vas County
- 2nd constituency of Vas County
- 3rd constituency of Vas County

=== Veszprém ===
4 constituencies:

- 1st constituency of Veszprém County
- 2nd constituency of Veszprém County
- 3rd constituency of Veszprém County
- 4th constituency of Veszprém County

=== Zala ===
3 constituencies:

- 1st constituency of Zala County
- 2nd constituency of Zala County
- 3rd constituency of Zala County
