= Jász-Nagykun-Szolnok County 1st constituency (1990–2011) =

Jász-Nagykun-Szolnok County 1st constituency (Jászberény)
- Former Constituency for the National Assembly
- County: Jász-Nagykun-Szolnok

Former Constituency
- Created: 1990
- Abolished: 2011
- Replaced by: Constituency no. 2

The Jász-Nagykun-Szolnok County constituency no. 1 (Hungarian: Jász-Nagykun-Szolnok megye 01. számú egyéni választókerület) was one of the single member constituencies of the National Assembly, the national legislature of Hungary. The district was established in 1990, when the National Assembly was re-established with the end of the communist dictatorship. It was abolished in 2011.

== Members ==
The constituency was first represented by Zoltán Kis of the Alliance of Free Democrats (SZDSZ) from 1990 to 2002. József Gedei of the Hungarian Socialist Party (MSZP) was elected in 2002 and served until 2010. In the 2010 election, Tamás Szabó of Fidesz was elected representative.

Election	Member	Party	%
1990	Zoltán Kis	SZDSZ	44.4
1994	Zoltán Kis	SZDSZ	43.0
1998	Zoltán Kis	SZDSZ	58.4
2002	József Gedei	MSZP	50.4
2006	József Gedei	MSZP	57.2
2010	Tamás Szabó	Fidesz	58.2

== Election result ==
=== 2010 election ===
2010 parliamentary election: Jász-Nagykun-Szolnok County - 1st constituency
Party	Candidate	Votes	%	±%
Fidesz–KDNP	Dr. Tamás Szabó	11,049	49.40	
MSZP	Dr. József Gedei	6,352	28.40	
Jobbik	Levente Murányi	4,966	22.20	
Turnout		22,707	61.06	
2nd round result
Fidesz–KDNP	Dr. Tamás Szabó	9,259	58.15	
MSZP	Dr. József Gedei	4,291	26.95	
Jobbik	Levente Murányi	2,373	14.90	
Turnout		16,034	43.19	
Fidesz–KDNP gain from MSZP		Swing		

=== 2006 election ===
2006 parliamentary election: Jász-Nagykun-Szolnok County - 1st constituency
Party	Candidate	Votes	%	±%
MSZP	Dr. József Gedei	10,907	47.30	
Fidesz–KDNP	Gábor Szádvári	8,843	38.35	
SZDSZ	Dr. Zoltán Kis	2,173	9.42	
MDF	Mihály Szentesi	1,031	4.47	
MCF	Csaba Fehér	104	0.45	
Turnout		23,330	61.93	
2nd round result
MSZP	Dr. József Gedei	12,239	57.23	
Fidesz–KDNP	Gábor Szádvári	9,145	42.77	
Turnout		21,497	57.09	
MSZP hold		Swing		

=== 2002 election ===
2002 parliamentary election: Jász-Nagykun-Szolnok County - 1st constituency
Party	Candidate	Votes	%	±%
MSZP	Dr. József Gedei	8,787	35.50	
Fidesz–MDF	Gábor Szádvári	7,566	30.56	
SZDSZ	Dr. Zoltán Kis	4,754	19.20	
Independent	Antal Kasza	1,237	5.00	
MIÉP	Dr. Andrea Czappán	768	3.10	
Workers' Party	Andor Pál	678	2.74	
Centre Party	István Papp	493	1.99	New
FKGP	János Ballagó	310	1.25	
Independent	József Fazekas	162	0.65	
Turnout		25,119	65.97	
2nd round result
MSZP	Dr. József Gedei	13,484	50.39	
Fidesz–MDF	Gábor Szádvári	13,273	49.61	
Turnout		26,980	70.85	
MSZP gain from SZDSZ		Swing		

=== 1998 election ===
1998 parliamentary election: Jász-Nagykun-Szolnok County - 1st constituency
Party	Candidate	Votes	%	±%
SZDSZ	Dr. Zoltán Kis	5,873	29.97	
MSZP	Dr. Zoltán Jakus	4,052	20.68	
FKGP	Antal Kasza	3,376	17.23	
Fidesz	Dr. István Wirth	3,271	16.69	
KDNP	Gábor Szádvári	1,026	5.24	
Workers' Party	Tibor Galcsik	834	4.26	
MIÉP	László Kaszab	648	3.31	
MDF	Dr. Dezső Boros	515	2.63	
Turnout		19,918	51.94	
2nd round result
SZDSZ	Dr. Zoltán Kis	10,512	58.43	
FKGP	Antal Kasza	7,480	41.57	
Turnout		18,309	47.75	
SZDSZ hold		Swing		

=== 1994 election ===
1994 parliamentary election: Jász-Nagykun-Szolnok County - 1st constituency
Party	Candidate	Votes	%	±%
SZDSZ	Dr. Zoltán Kis	8,450	33.67	
MSZP	Dr. Károly Stanitz	5,389	21.47	
FKGP	Dr. Máté Fenyvesi	2,378	9.48	
MDF	Dr. Miklós Farkas	2,165	8.63	
KDNP	Gábor Szádvári	1,982	7.90	
Fidesz	István Dobák	1,200	4.78	
Agrarian Alliance	Dr. János Novotni	1,107	4.41	
Workers' Party	Imre Mézes	997	3.97	
Republican Party	Dr. Tibor Csabai	753	3.00	New
EKGP	István Szigeti	429	1.71	New
TFKGP	Szilveszter Szegedi	247	0.98	New
Turnout		25,537		
2nd round result
SZDSZ	Dr. Zoltán Kis	8,506	43.01	
MSZP	Dr. Károly Stanitz	6,730	34.03	
FKGP	Dr. Máté Fenyvesi	4,543	22.97	
Turnout		20,065		
SZDSZ hold		Swing		

=== 1990 election ===
1990 parliamentary election: Jász-Nagykun-Szolnok County - 1st constituency
Party	Candidate	Votes	%	±%
SZDSZ	Dr. Zoltán Kis	6,196	26.83	
FKGP	István Szigeti	4,434	19.20	
MDF	Dr. László Pethő	2,762	11.96	
HVK	Dr. László Dobos	2,062	8.93	
MSZP	Dr. Zoltán Jakus	2,025	8.77	
Agrarian Alliance	Béla Szabó	1,462	6.33	
Independent	Dr. János Knorr	1,138	4.93	
Workers' Party	Dr. Gábor Jánosi	1,118	4.84	
Independent	Dr. Tibor Csabai	1,022	4.43	
Independent	Rudolf Kókai	460	1.99	
Independent	Dr. Zoltán Lukács	416	1.80	
Turnout		23,837		
2nd round result
SZDSZ	Dr. Zoltán Kis	6,616	44.44	
MDF	Dr. László Pethő	4,252	28.56	
FKGP	István Szigeti	4,021	27.01	
Turnout		15,189		
SZDSZ win (new seat)				
