= János Szabó (Minister of Agriculture) =

Hungarian jurist (1937–2021)

Minister of Agriculture
- In office 23 February 1993 – 15 July 1994
- Prime Minister: József Antall; Péter Boross; Gyula Horn
- Preceded by: Elemér Gergátz
- Succeeded by: László Lakos

Personal details
- Born: 29 October 1937 Tápiószentmárton, Hungary
- Died: 25 February 2021 (aged 83) Tápiószentmárton, Hungary
- Party: FKGP, EKGP
- Profession: jurist, politician

János Szabó (29 October 1937 – 25 February 2021) was a Hungarian jurist and politician, who served as Minister of Agriculture between 1993 and 1994.

== Career ==
János Szabó was born in Tápiószentmárton in 1937, as the only child of farmer József Szabó and Margit Mester. His father was a prisoner of war in the Soviet Union from January 1945 to July 1947. János attended elementary school in his birthplace. He finished his secondary studies at the Kossuth Lajos Gymnasium in Cegléd in 1956. He earned a degree in law at the Faculty of Law of the University of Szeged (SZTE) in 1960. He worked for the Military Prosecutor's Office of Debrecen and Szeged, then for the Council of Csongrád County between 1960 and 1965. He became a practicing lawyer in 1965, as a member of the Győr No. 1 Bar Association. He suspended his legal practice in 1990.

At the height of the transition to democracy, Szabó joined Independent Smallholders, Agrarian Workers and Civic Party (FKGP) in August 1989. He was elected prosecutor of the party's Győr-Moson-Sopron County branch in the autumn of that year. He ran for an individual seat for Győr (Győr-Moson-Sopron County Constituency I) during the 1990 parliamentary election, where he came to the third place after László Medgyasszay (MDF) and Dorottya Büky (SZDSZ). He obtained a mandate from his party's local county list. In the parliament, Szabó was a member of the Committee on Constitutional Affairs, Legislation and Justice from 1990 to 1991 and from 1992 to 1993 (serving as its vice-chairman in the latter period). Briefly, he was also a member of the Municipal, Administrative, Homeland Security and Police Committee from 1991 to 1992, and the Rules of Procedure Committee in 1992.

The coalition between the Hungarian Democratic Forum (MDF) and the Independent Smallholders' Party, led by József Torgyán broke up in February 1992. Szabó joined that faction of the parliamentary group which intended to remain in the government. The majority of the caucus, the Group of 33 MPs, later 36 MPs continued to support the government, while FKGP (Group of 12 MPs then 10 MPs) went into opposition. Szabó was elected leader of the pro-government parliamentary group in September 1992, holding the position until February 1993. Prime Minister József Antall appointed him Minister of Agriculture on 23 February 1993. Meanwhile, the pro-government smallholders' faction formed the United Smallholders' Party (EKGP) as a formal organizational unit on 6 November 1993. Szabó was elected the first party chairman of the party on 19 December 1993. Szabó retained his ministerial position in the government of Péter Boross too until 15 July 1994. During the 1994 parliamentary election, the EKGP received only 0.82 percent of the vote, while its main rival the Torgyán-led FKGP again entered the parliament with 8.82 percent of the vote, thus Szabó lost his parliamentary seat. On 17 December 1994, Szabó was replaced by Géza Zsiros as party leader. He retired from national politics thereafter. He returned to the FKGP in 2002. Szabó was a member of the local representative body of Tápiószentmárton from 1998 to 2010.

== Personal life ==
János Szabó married Gabriella Pethő in 1962. They had two children, lawyer László (b. 1964) and Katalin (b. 1971). Szabó was granted honorary citizenship of Tápiószentmárton in 1994, for "the development of his birthplace, for the aging of the good reputation of the village, for the help of the construction of the Tápiószentmárton-Albertirsa connecting road". He often played on his tárogató at local events.

Szabó died on 25 February 2021, at the age of 83.

Political offices
Preceded by Elemér Gergátz	Minister of Agriculture; 1993–1994	Succeeded by László Lakos
