= Ferenc József Nagy =

Hungarian politician (1923–2019)

Minister of Agriculture
- In office 23 May 1990 – 16 January 1991
- Prime Minister: József Antall
- Preceded by: Csaba Hütter (Minister of Agriculture and Food)
- Succeeded by: Elemér Gergátz

Personal details
- Born: 22 April 1923 Kisharsány, Hungary
- Died: 14 May 2019 (aged 96)
- Party: FKGP (1937–48, 1989–92); TFKGP (1992–93); EKGP (1993–94)
- Profession: politician

Ferenc József Nagy (22 April 1923 – 14 May 2019) was a Hungarian agrarian engineer and politician, who served as Minister of Agriculture between 1990 and 1991. After that he was appointed minister without portfolio, he also held this position in the cabinet of Péter Boross until 1994. Nagy was the chairman of the Independent Smallholders, Agrarian Workers and Civic Party for a short time.

== Professional life ==
Ferenc József Nagy was born into an affluent peasant family in Kisharsány, Baranya County on 22 April 1923. His Calvinist parents, Ferenc Nagy (1890–1939) and Ilona Kovács (1896–1980) were farming on 47 acres. He had a sister, Ilona (1920–1980). Ferenc József Nagy married Erzsébet Bobár in 1951. They had three children: Ferenc (b. 1952), Piroska (b. 1953) and Attila (b. 1957). Ferenc József Nagy was a Presbyter since 1957.

Nagy finished his elementary studies in his birthplace, then attended a secondary school at the nearby Siklós from 1933 to 1937. He farmed the family estate then. At the age of 14, he joined the local branch of the Independent Smallholders' Party (FKGP) in 1937. He became organizing secretary of the interest association Hungarian Peasant Alliance in 1941. As a notary, he was also involved in the Civic Reading Club between 1941 and 1948. Beside that he was a youth leader of the Christian Youth Alliance (KIE) from 1937 to 1948. He was a founding member of the Youth of Awakening Baranya in 1942.

Following the Soviet Occupation of Hungary and the Communist takeover, he was labelled as "kulak" and the half of his farm lands was confiscated, while Nagy was sent to compulsory military service to Kunmadaras in 1951. During his absence, his family was evicted and deported to Kunmadaras. Nagy worked for the Hungarian State Railways there from 1952 to 1956. He returned to Kisharsány in 1956, where continued to farming on his remaining estate of 22 acres. He distanced himself from the events during the Hungarian Revolution of 1956, which also affected his village. He graduated from the correspondence course of the Agricultural Technical School of Szentlőrinc, attending there from 1958 to 1962. Meanwhile, he became head of the local agricultural co-operative in 1959. He involved in the organization and its legal successors until his retirement in 1983. Nagy was a member of the Executive Committee of the Local Council of Kisharsány between 1960 and 1978. He earned a degree of agrarian engineer at the College of Agricultural Sciences in Keszthely in 1967.

== Political career ==
During the transition to democracy in Hungary, Nagy joined the re-emerging Independent Smallholders' Party on 23 March 1989. He was elected one of the vice-presidents of the party on 4 June 1989. He was elected a Member of Parliament for Siklós (Baranya County Constituency V) in the 1990 Hungarian parliamentary election. Following the resignation of Vince Vörös, he was elected President of the Independent Smallholders' Party in May 1990. In this capacity, Nagy led the coalition negotiations on behalf of his party with József Antall, Prime Minister-designate and leader of the Hungarian Democratic Forum (MDF). Nagy was appointed Minister of Agriculture in the forming Antall cabinet on 23 May 1990. He held his position until 16 January 1991, when he was made Minister without portfolio for Compensation. He supervised the National and Ethnic Minority Office in that capacity too. The national board of the FKPG elected József Torgyán as co-president of the party alongside Nagy on 27 April 1991. Nagy did not run as candidate in the following party congress, thus Torgyán remained the sole president of the party after 29 June 1991.

Torgyán withdrew his party's support from the Antall cabinet, which resulted that the parliamentary caucus of the FKGP split into two groups on 24 February 1992. The majority of the MPs, including Nagy continued to support the government. He retained his position of minister in the cabinet too. As a member of the FKGP's Historic Division, Nagy joined the pro-government Historic Independent Smallholders' Party (TFKGP), led by Tivadar Pártay. By autumn 1993, the conflicts among the anti-Torgyán forces emerged as Pártay wanted to keep his party's monopolist status. Initially, Nagy remained a supporter of Pártay, but later he also joined the United Smallholders' Party (EKGP). Following the death of József Antall in December 1993, Nagy retained his position of Minister of Compensation in the cabinet of Péter Boross, until 15 July 1994, when the Socialist leader Gyula Horn formed his government after the 1994 Hungarian parliamentary election. He retired from the politics in 1994.

Political offices
Preceded by Csaba Hütter	Minister of Agriculture; 1990–1991	Succeeded by Elemér Gergátz
Preceded by Jenő Gerbovits	Minister of Compensation; 1991–1994	Succeeded by position abolished
Party political offices
Preceded by Vince Vörös	Chairman of the Independent Smallholders' Party; 1990–1991	Succeeded by József Torgyán
