= Miklós Lukáts =

Hungarian minister and politician (1946–2022)

Member of Parliament
- In office 2 May 1990 – 27 June 1994
- Constituency: National List

Personal details
- Born: 27 March 1946 Szombathely, Hungary
- Died: 30 October 2022 (aged 76)
- Party: Christian Democratic People's Party

Miklós Péter Lukáts (27 March 1946 – 30 October 2022) was a Hungarian Lutheran minister and politician who served in the National Assembly of Hungary from 1990 until 1994. A founding member of the Christian Democratic People's Party, Lukáts was a key figure in the end of communism in Hungary and oversaw the transition in Hungarian religious policy in his position as State Secretary for Church Affairs.

== Biography ==
Miklós Lukáts was born on 27 March 1946 in the city of Szombathely, Hungary. Lukáts's father died when he was young, and he was primarily raised by his grandfather, a former judge who remained politically active. Lukáts and his grandfather would frequently talk about politics, and Lukáts credited this for his interest in politics. Though initially trained as an architect, Lukáts became the presbyter of the Lutheran Church of Fasor in 1971, a position he would hold for decades.

In the late 1980s, Lukáts was a key figure in the end of communism in Hungary. In 1988, he became a founding member of the Áron Márton Society, a political organization which would serve as a workshop for Christian democratic politics. The following year, Lukáts and other members of the Áron Márton Society refounded the Christian Democratic People's Party (KDNP), with Lukáts becoming its national organizing secretary. In the 1990 Hungarian parliamentary election, Lukáts was elected to the National Assembly of Hungary via the KDNP party list, becoming one of 21 KDNP candidates elected. He did not seek re-election in the 1994 Hungarian parliamentary election.

During his tenure in parliament, Lukáts was heavily involved with shift in religious policy following the end of communism, which saw the State Church Affairs Office abolished and no office established to replace it. Lukáts was appointed a state secretary in the Ministry of Culture and Public Education on 1 June 1990; in this role, Lukáts oversaw the introduction of religious education in Hungary. He held this position until 14 September 1990, when Prime Minister József Antall appointed him to the Prime Minister's Office as State Secretary for Church Affairs. As state secretary, Lukáts's primary task was to oversee the transfer of church properties that had been seized during communist rule back to their original owners, and he was to serve as a "connecting link between the government and the churches". During his tenure, Lukáts was one of the organisers for visits by Pope John Paul II and the 14th Dalai Lama to Hungary. He also held negotiations with the World Council of Churches and the government of Switzerland regarding the Hungarian Reformed Church. Lukáts served in this role until he left parliament in 1994. While in parliament, Lukáts also served on the Environmental Protection Committee.

On 25 March 1992, the day after the opening ceremony of the European Protestant Convention in Budapest, Lukáts formed the KDNP Protestant Workshop, a parliamentary organization which sought to "promote the participation of Protestants in public life" and to "provide a political alternative to non-Catholic Christians". Lukáts served as the workshop's chairman from its founding until 1996. After leaving parliament, Lukáts became a Lutheran minister, and he served as a member of the national presbytery from 1992 to 2000.

In 2019, Lukáts was awarded the Middle Cross of the Hungarian Order of Merit by President János Áder for "his role in putting the relationship between the church and the state on a new footing, as well as in initiating the property settlement of church properties". Lukáts died from an illness on 30 October 2022 at the age of 76.

== Personal life ==
He was the son of Rezső Lukáts and Borbála Medveczky. In 1970, he married Ágnes Juhász. They had two sons together, Péter Lukáts in 1971 and Tamás Lukáts in 1977, who are musicians in the Hungarian psychobilly band Gorilla (psychobilly).

Lukáts was the great-grandson of Béla Medveczky, who took part in the Hungarian Revolution of 1848.
