= Historic Independent Smallholders' Party =

Historic Independent Smallholders' Party Történelmi Független Kisgazda Párt
- Leader: Tivadar Pártay
- Founded: 6 October 1992
- Dissolved: 5 August 2003
- Split from: Independent Smallholders, Agrarian Workers and Civic Party (FKGP)
- Newspaper: Heti Kis Újság
- Ideology: Agrarianism; National conservativism
- Political position: Centre-right

The Historic Independent Smallholders' Party (Hungarian: Történelmi Független Kisgazda Párt; TFKGP), was an agrarianist political party in Hungary, after having its members left the Independent Smallholders, Agrarian Workers and Civic Party (FKGP).

== History ==
The party was formed in Budapest by former FKGP leader Tivadar Pártay with the agreement of Prime Minister József Antall. Prior that, Pártay strongly criticized FKGP president József Torgyán's step who decided to left Antall's conservative government in February 1992, as a result several entire branches left FKGP to continue to support the cabinet. Pártay intended to unite the anti-Torgyán smallholder groups and parties into a sole umbrella organization. When the Supreme Court ruled in favour of Torgyán on the issue of FKGP leadership, the establishment of a new party remained the only option for the pro-government factions.

On 11 February 1993, the FKGP's Historic Division joined the TFKGP. On 28 June 1993, sixteen members of the so-called pro-government ex-FKGP Group of 36 MPs formed the TFKGP's parliamentary work group led by István Prepeliczay and also involving e.g. Ferenc József Nagy. By autumn 1993, the conflicts among the anti-Torgyán forces emerged as Pártay wanted to keep his party's monopolist status. As a result, the United Smallholders' Party (EKGP) established without the participation of the TFKGP and Compromise Independent Smallholders' Party (KFKGP), while the Historic Division and the National Smallholders' and Civic Party (NKPP) joined the alliance. Pártay considered the step as a betrayal. Several members left his party, but two MPs, Ferenc József Nagy and Lajos Szabó remained supporters of Pártay.

The TFKGP was able to nominee only two individual candidates in the 1994 parliamentary election. They received 0.03 percent of the votes, gaining no seats. Following that the party activity gradually declined. Due to his poor health, Pártay resigned from his position of party chairman and retired from politics on 23 March 1997. He died on 9 August 1999, aged 91.

== Election results ==
=== National Assembly ===
| Election year | National Assembly | | | | Government |
| Election year | # of overall votes | % of overall vote | # of overall seats won | +/– | Government |
|---|---|---|---|---|---|
| 1994 | 1,792 | 0.03% | 0 / 386 | | extra-parliamentary |

== Sources ==
- Vida, István (2011). "Történelmi Független Kisgazda Párt (TFKGP)". Magyarországi politikai pártok lexikona (1846–2010) [Encyclopedia of the Political Parties in Hungary (1846–2010)] (in Hungarian). Gondolat Kiadó. pp. 460–461. ISBN 978-963-693-276-3.
