= Jenő Gerbovits =

Hungarian politician

Minister of Compensation of Hungary
- In office 23 May 1990 – 16 January 1991
- Preceded by: post established
- Succeeded by: Ferenc József Nagy

Personal details
- Born: 13 May 1925; Zics, Hungary
- Died: 24 August 2011 (aged 86); Zics, Hungary
- Political party: FKGP, EKGP

Jenő Gerbovits (13 May 1925 – 24 August 2011) was a Hungarian politician and member of the National Assembly of Hungary between 1990 and 1994. He served as Minister without portfolio for Compensation in the cabinet of József Antall. He was a member of the Independent Smallholders, Agrarian Workers and Civic Party.

Gerbovits died in a farm accident on 24 August 2011 in his birthplace. According to the police press officer the retired politician was driving his homemade tractor on his land in Zics (Somogy County) when the vehicle overturned on a slope, burying him underneath. He died at the scene.

Political offices
| Preceded by position established | Minister of Compensation; 1990–1991 | Succeeded by Ferenc József Nagy |
