= Antal Bélafi =

Hungarian politician and agronomist (1925–1992)

Member of the National Assembly
- In office 2 May 1990 – 29 September 1992

Personal details
- Born: 26 November 1925 Kislőd, Hungary
- Died: 29 September 1992 (aged 66) Budapest, Hungary
- Party: FKGP, EKGP
- Profession: agronomist, politician

Antal Bélafi (26 November 1925 – 29 September 1992) was a Hungarian agronomist and politician, member of the National Assembly (MP) from FKGP Veszprém County Regional List between 1990 and 1992.

== Biography ==
He was born into a farmer family. He finished his secondary school studies in Budapest and Veszprém. He joined the Independent Smallholders, Agrarian Workers and Civic Party (FKGP) in 1945. He participated in the reorganization of the FKGP during the Hungarian Revolution of 1956.

Bélafi secured a mandate in the first democratic parliamentary election in 1990. He was a member of the Committee on Environment from 23 February 1992. In February 1992 he joined the United Smallholders' Party (EKGP) which continued to support the Cabinet of József Antall in contrast to the FKGP parliamentary group led by József Torgyán. He died on 29 September 1992. He was replaced by Sándorné Sümegi ("Mrs. Sándor Sümegi") on 2 November 1992.
