= Elemér Gergátz =

Hungarian veterinarian and politician (1942–2019)

Minister of Agriculture
- In office 16 January 1991 – 22 February 1993
- Prime Minister: József Antall
- Preceded by: Ferenc József Nagy
- Succeeded by: János Szabó

Personal details
- Born: 6 May 1942 Rábatamási, Kingdom of Hungary
- Died: 19 June 2019 (aged 77)
- Party: FKGP, EKGP
- Profession: veterinarian, politician

Elemér Gergátz (6 May 1942 – 19 June 2019) was a Hungarian veterinarian and politician, who served as Minister of Agriculture between 1991 and 1993.

During his ministership he tried to compensate farmers and agrarian workers as a result subdivided land structure formed which the main cause of difficulties of the Hungarian agriculture. The coalition between the Hungarian Democratic Forum (MDF) and the Independent Smallholders, Agrarian Workers and Civic Party broke up in 1992. Gergátz wanted to stay in the government so he was excluded from the party. Soon after he joined to the United Smallholders' Party (EKGP).

Gergátz died on 19 June 2019, at the age of 77.

== Sources ==
- Bölöny, József – Hubai, László: Magyarország kormányai 1848–2004 [Cabinets of Hungary 1848–2004], Akadémiai Kiadó, Budapest, 2004 (5th edition).
- Zsigmond Király Főiskola - Jelenkutató Csoport

Political offices
Preceded by Ferenc József Nagy	Minister of Agriculture; 1991–1993	Succeeded by János Szabó
