= Imre Pozsgay =

Hungarian politician (1933–2016)

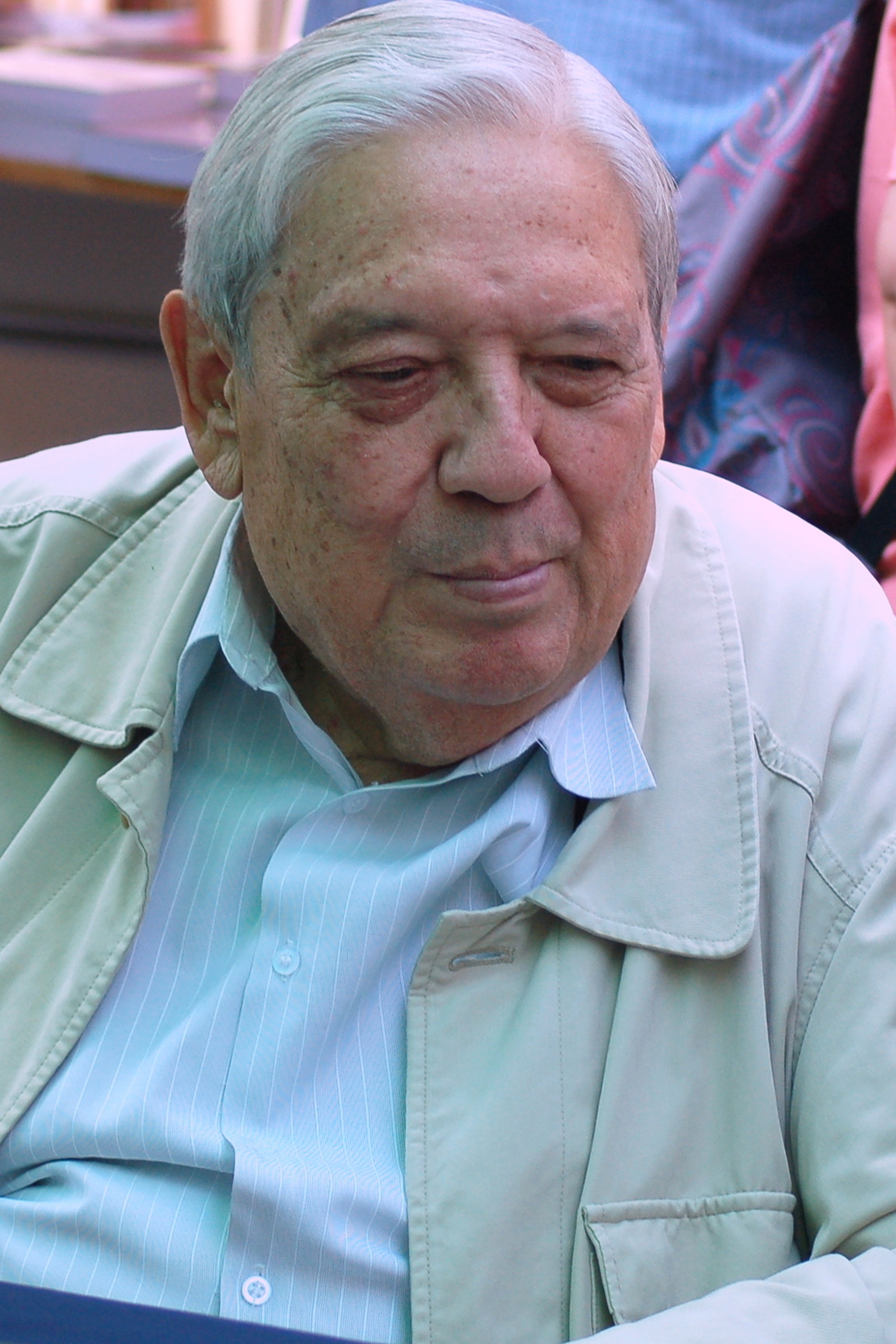
- Imre Pozsgay in June 2012

Minister of Education
- In office 27 June 1980 – 25 June 1982
- Preceded by: Károly Polinszky
- Succeeded by: Béla Köpeczi

Minister of Culture
- In office 22 July 1976 – 27 June 1980
- Preceded by: László Orbán
- Succeeded by: Himself (as Minister of Education)

Personal details
- Born: 26 November 1933 Kóny, Kingdom of Hungary
- Died: 25 March 2016 (aged 82) Budapest, Hungary
- Party: MDP (1950–1956); MSZMP (1956–1989); MSZP (1989–1990); NDSZ (1991–1996)
- Children: 2
- Education: Eötvös Loránd University
- Profession: politician

Imre András Pozsgay (Pozsgay Imre, Hungarian: [ˈpoʒɡɒji imrɛ]; 26 November 1933 – 25 March 2016) was a Hungarian Communist politician who played a key role in Hungary's transition to democracy after 1988. He served as Minister of Culture (1976–1980), Minister of Education (1980–1982) and Minister of State (1988–1990). He was also a Member of Parliament from 1983 to 1994.

== Life and career ==
=== Career in the Communist Party ===
Pozsgay was born in Kóny on 26 November 1933 as the son of tailor Imre Pozsgay, Sr. (died 1938) and housewife Rozália Lénárt. After finishing elementary and secondary studies in Enying and Fertőd, respectively, he joined the Hungarian Working People's Party (MDP) in 1950 which had established a Communist one-party system by then. In 1951, he became head of the Balatonbozsok (today part of Enying) party branch. Following the Hungarian Revolution of 1956, Pozsgay became a member of the reorganized state party, the Hungarian Socialist Workers' Party (MSZMP). After that he graduated with an English degree from the Lenin Institute in Budapest, which belonged to the Eötvös Loránd University. On 15 December 1957, he published an article in Petőfi Népe (newspaper of the MDP) about the 1956 revolution under the title "Revolution or Counter-revolution?". Therein he called the 1956 events as a "pure counter-revolution", which tried to restore the "capitalist conditions and the bourgeois rule". Pozsgay pretended Imre Nagy was an "unprincipled" man who became Prime Minister "in the days of the raging White Terror".

Between 1957 and 1965, he functioned as Director of the MSZMP Bács-Kiskun County Committee's Marxist–Leninist Evening University. Between 1965 and 1968, he was Head of the Agitation and Propaganda Department of the local county branch. Until 1969, he served as Secretary of the party's Bács-Kiskun County branch. After that he was appointed Head of the Central Committee's Press Department. From 1971 to 1975, he was Deputy Editor in Chief of Társadalmi Szemle. In 1970, he defended his C.Sc. thesis in philosophy.

In 1975, he was appointed Deputy Minister of Culture under László Orbán in the cabinet of Prime Minister György Lázár. In 1976 he was promoted to Minister of Culture, replacing Orbán. In June 1980, his ministry was merged into the Ministry of Education, his responsibilities conferred with education and cultural affairs after that. Beside his ministership, he also became a member of the MSZMP's Central Committee. As minister, he established the independent Katona József Theatre in 1982.

In 1982, his calls for reform (which he describes in his book Turning Point and Reform) led to a falling-out with the party's leader János Kádár which in turn moved Pozsgay to become Secretary-General of the party's mass organization, the 'Patriotic People's Front' (HNF) under President Gyula Kállai. In 1983, he was elected to the National Assembly of Hungary during a by-election. In the 1985 parliamentary election, he became MP from the party's national list. Returning to the government sphere, he became Minister of State in the cabinets of Károly Grósz then Miklós Németh from 1988 to 1990. He was also a member of the Politburo until its dissolution in 1989, and Chairman of the College of Political Communication, Political Science and Nationalities.

On 28 January 1989, Pozsgay, as the first from ruling party, stunned the Communist establishment by labelling the 1956 Hungarian revolution not a counterrevolution but a "popular uprising". Pozsgay participated in the reburial of Imre Nagy in June 1989, which proved to be a catalyst event; the hard-line Károly Grósz was outranked by a four-member collective presidency (included Pozsgay) of the reformist wing within the MSZMP on 26 June 1989. The ruling communist party began discussions with the opposition groups within the framework of the so-called Round Table Talks. Jointly with Otto von Habsburg, Imre Pozsgay was the sponsor of the Pan-European Picnic of 19 August 1989, where hundreds of East Germans who were visiting Hungary were able to cross the previously impenetrable Iron Curtain into Austria.

The question of the post-communist presidential position was one of the most problematic disputes between the parties. The MSZMP suggested a directly elected semi-presidential system. However, this proposal was strongly opposed by the sharply anti-communist SZDSZ and Fidesz. They presumed that Pozsgay, the country's most popular politician at the time, would win any ensuing election. Following collecting signatures by Fidesz and SZDSZ, a four-part referendum was held on 26 November 1989, where the voters chose "yes" for the question of "Should the president be elected after parliamentary election?" and also adopted a system in which the president would be indirectly elected by parliament.

Pozsgay had donated his personal documents and records to the Hoover Institution Library and Archives in 1989, and authorized the institution to make them public in 2009. Richard Sousa, director of the Institution, estimated that Pozsgay will be recognized by history as a leader who helped the transition to democracy in Hungary.

=== After the transition to democracy ===
In October 1989, the Hungarian Socialist Workers Party renamed itself the Hungarian Socialist Party (MSZP) and announced Poszgay as their Deputy President. He was the party's candidate for the position of President of Hungary in 1990. He was elected MP from the MSZP's Bács-Kiskun County Regional List, after defeated by József Szájer (Fidesz) in Sopron constituency (Győr-Moson-Sopron County VII). He served as leader of its parliamentary group from May until November 1990, when he quit the caucus and the party itself, and became an independent MP. In May 1991, Pozsgay formed a new party, which he headed himself alongside Zoltán Bíró, called the National Democratic Alliance. The NDSZ, which had a third way ideology and advocated a varying synthesis of right-wing economic and left-wing social policies, have failed to win any seats in the 1994 parliamentary election, receiving only 0.52 percent of the vote. After that the party dissolved on 20 January 1996. From 1996 to 2001, he was a member of the presidium of the World Federation of Hungarians (MVSZ).

Since 1991, he had been teaching at the University of Debrecen (formerly Kossuth Lajos University). He was also a lecturer at the Károli Gáspár University of the Reformed Church in Hungary since 2003. Beside that he was also Rector of the Saint Ladislaus Academy between 1995 and 2000. He received Hungarian Heritage Award in 2003. In 2012, he founded a journal Stádium in Százhalombatta. In 2015, he was awarded Saint Stephen Prize.

Pozsgay became an adviser to the Hungarian Democratic Forum (MDF) in 1997, he was also the party's candidate in the 1998 parliamentary election but did not gain a mandate. He returned to the political sphere in 2005, when he became a member of the National Consultation Body led by Viktor Orbán, the President of Fidesz. In 2010, a new government led by Fidesz initiated a drafting process for a new constitution. Pozsgay became a member of the board advising Prime Minister Viktor Orbán on the conceptual foundations of the new fundamental law.

== Death ==
Imre Pozsgay died on 25 March 2016, at the age of 82, his family told Magyar Távirati Iroda. In a statement, the Fidesz–KDNP government sent its condolences to his family, and noted Pozsgay's "inevitable" role in the transition process to democracy. According to the statement, Pozsgay "despite his major role in the Communist and Socialist parties, had a commitment to the future of the country and its people".

== Awards ==
In 2010 Pozsgay received the Dr.Rainer Hildebrandt Human Rights Award endowed by Alexandra Hildebrandt. The award is given annually in recognition of extraordinary, non-violent commitment to human rights.

== Selected works ==
- Szocialista társadalom és humanizmus (1978)
- Demokrácia és kultúra (1980)
- Októberi kérdések (1988)
- Esélyünk a reform (1988)
- Politikuspálya a pártállamban és a rendszerváltásban (1993)
- Koronatanú és tettestárs (1998)
- A rendszerváltás (k)ára (co-author with Tibor Polgár, 2003)

== See also ==
- History of Hungary
  - Hungarian People's Republic
  - Third Republic (since 1989)

== Bibliography ==
- Elster, Jon; Offe, Claus; Preuss, Ulrich K (1998), Institutional Design in Post-communist Societies, Cambridge University Press, ISBN 0-521-47931-2.
- Grzymała-Busse, Anna Maria (2002), Redeeming the Communist Past: The Regeneration of Communist Parties in East Central Europe, Cambridge University Press, ISBN 0-521-00146-3.

Political offices
Preceded by László Orbán	Minister of Culture; 1976–1980	Succeeded by Position abolished
Preceded by Károly Polinszky	Minister of Education; 1980–1982	Succeeded by Béla Köpeczi
Vacant Title last held by Ferenc Münnich	Minister of State alongside Rezső Nyers until 1989; 1988–1990	Succeeded by Position abolished
National Assembly of Hungary
Preceded by Csaba Hámori	Leader of the MSZP parliamentary group 1990	Succeeded by Zoltán Gál
Party political offices
Preceded by István Sarlós	Secretary-General of the Patriotic People's Front; 1982–1988	Succeeded by István Huszár
Preceded by New party	Co-President of the National Democratic Alliance alongside Zoltán Bíró; 1991–1996	Succeeded by Party abolished
