= National Forces' Movement =

National Forces' Movement Nemzeti Erők Mozgalma
- Co-Presidents: György Kassa; Gyula Hernádi; Gergely Walcz
- Founded: 23 October 1993
- Dissolved: 31 October 1997
- Merger of: BOP and MRP
- Merged into: EMU
- Ideology: Left-wing nationalism
- Political position: Left-wing

The National Forces' Movement (Hungarian: Nemzeti Erők Mozgalma; NEM) was a radical left-wing nationalist party in Hungary, existed between 1993 and 1997.

== History ==
The party was founded on 23 October 1993 from a merger of the Happiness Party (BOP) and the Hungarian Republican Party (MRP). Entrepreneurs György Kassa, Gyula Hernádi and Gergely Walcz were elected co-leaders of the movement. Soon, the Republicans had to leave NEM because it is revealed that its organization was associated with the organized criminal underworld. The MRP was replaced by the Association of Persons Living Below Subsistence Level. The NEM intended to establish the "people-oriented welfare society" and called for new radical political changes by criticizing the Antall government and the opposition parliamentary parties. The NEM also intended to review the rapid privatization.

The NEM contested the 1994 parliamentary election with only one candidate, entrepreneur György Klutsik, who gained 188 votes. Before the 1998 parliamentary election, the NEM joined and merged into the electoral alliance Union for Hungary (EMU) which also failed to win a seat.

== Election results ==
=== National Assembly ===
Election year	National Assembly				Government
Election year	# of overall votes	% of overall vote	# of overall seats won	+/–	Government
1994	188	0.01%	0 / 386		extra-parliamentary
1998	Union for Hungary		0 / 386	0	extra-parliamentary

== Sources ==
- Vida, István (2011). "Nemzeti Erők Mozgalma (NEM)". Magyarországi politikai pártok lexikona (1846–2010) [Encyclopedia of the Political Parties in Hungary (1846–2010)] (in Hungarian). Gondolat Kiadó. pp. 435–436. ISBN 978-963-693-276-3.
