= Hungarian Mothers' National Party =

Hungarian Mothers' National Party Magyar Anyák Nemzeti Pártja
- Chairperson: Ágnes Sokoray-Tell
- Founded: 1 December 1992
- Dissolved: 29 September 2001
- Merged into: ÚBP
- Ideology: Women's rights National conservatism

The Hungarian Mothers' National Party (Hungarian: Magyar Anyák Nemzeti Pártja; MANP) was an extra-parliamentary party in Hungary, existed between 1992 and 2001.

== History ==
The MANP, founded in Pápa, intended to overcome the demographic crisis, re-introduction of the conservative-civic family model and education to national consciousness. According to party rules, only women could join the MANP. In its election program, the party supported the free medical care for women giving birth, 10 years of full-time motherhood and youth housing program. The MANP contested the 1994 parliamentary election with one individual candidate in Pápa, who gained only 265 votes. The party did not participate in the 1998 parliamentary election, after its cooperation negotiations have failed with the Party of the Hungarian Interest (AMÉP).

On 29 September 2001, the MANP merged into the New Left Party (ÚBP), which contested the 2002 parliamentary election.

== Election results ==
=== National Assembly ===
Election year	National Assembly				Government
Election year	# of overall votes	% of overall vote	# of overall seats won	+/–	Government
1994	265	0.01%	0 / 386		extra-parliamentary

== Sources ==
- Vida, István (2011). "Magyar Anyák Nemzeti Pártja (MANP)". Magyarországi politikai pártok lexikona (1846–2010) [Encyclopedia of the Political Parties in Hungary (1846–2010)] (in Hungarian). Gondolat Kiadó. p. 383. ISBN 978-963-693-276-3.
