= Zoltán Bíró =

Hungarian politician and historian

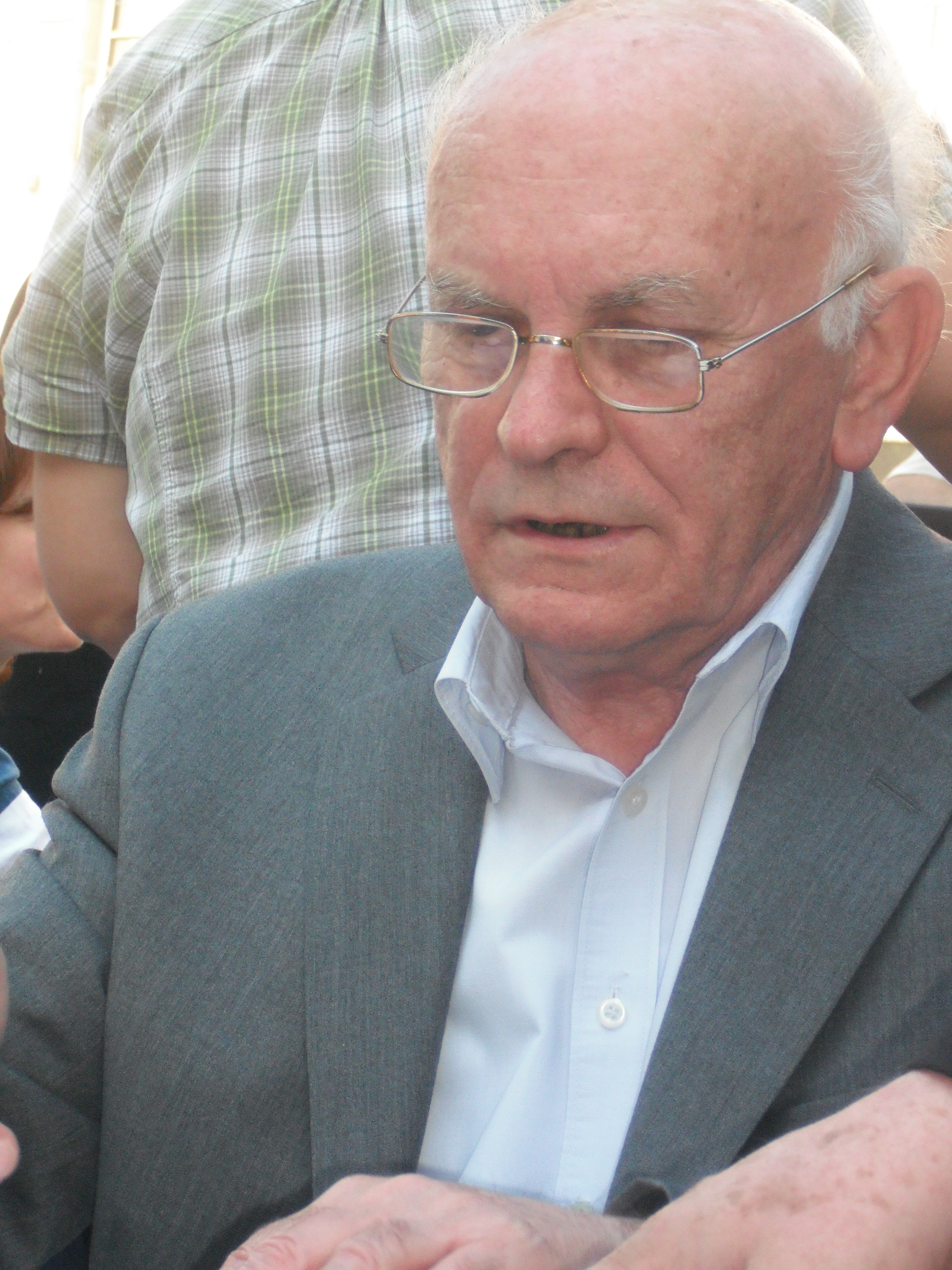

President of the Hungarian Democratic Forum
- In office 27 September 1987 – 21 October 1989
- Preceded by: New party
- Succeeded by: József Antall

Personal details
- Born: 21 April 1941 (age 84) Budapest, Hungary
- Party: MDF, NDSZ
- Occupation: politician
- Profession: literary historian, politician

Zoltán Bíró (born 21 April 1941) is a Hungarian literary historian, writer and politician who served as the first president of the Hungarian Democratic Forum. He quit the party in 1991 and became founding member of the National Democratic Alliance. He served as co-chairman of the new party along with Imre Pozsgay.

== Works ==
- Vállalások és kételyek. Esszék, tanulmányok (Szépirodalmi Könyvkiadó, 1987)
- Saját út. A népi írók magyar jövőképe 1945–1949 (Eötvös Kiadó, 1988)
- Októberi kérdések (Püski-Eötvös, 1988)
- Kizárt a párt (társszerző, 1989)
- Egy év után, választás előtt. Beszélgetések Pozsgay Imrével (Püski Kiadó, 1990)
- Elhervadt forradalom (Püski Kiadó, 1993)
- Ady Endre sorsköltészete (Püski Kiadó, 1998)
- Saját út (1998)
- Két nemzedék. A magyar irodalom két nagy nemzedéke a 20. században (Nemzeti Tankönyvkiadó, 2001)

Party political offices
Preceded by New party	President of the Hungarian Democratic Forum; 1987–1989	Succeeded by József Antall
Preceded by New party	Co-President of the National Democratic Alliance alongside Imre Pozsgay; 1991–1996	Succeeded by Party abolished
