= National Alliance of Hungarian Families =

National Alliance of Hungarian Families Magyar Családok Országos Szövetsége
- Leader: József Urbán Szabó
- Founded: 17 April 1993
- Dissolved: 28 April 2003 (as party)
- Ideology: Single-issue politics

The National Alliance of Hungarian Families (Hungarian: Magyar Családok Országos Szövetsége; MACSOSZ), is a non-governmental civil organization and a former political party in Hungary.

== History ==
The MACSOSZ was founded by entrepreneur József Urbán Szabó in Szigetszentmiklós initially as a civil organization, which transformed itself into a party for the 1994 parliamentary election. Businesspeople László Wittman and Ádám Éliás also joined the party. The MACSOSZ contested the election with five individual candidates who received 0.04% of the votes. Following the failure Éliás quit the party to join the Social Coalition for Humanitarian Politics (TKEP). The MACSOSZ transformed itself into a civil organization again which still exists today. Urbán Szabó represented his movement in the Szigetszentmiklós local representative body from 1994 until 2006.

== Election results ==
=== National Assembly ===
Election year	National Assembly				Government
Election year	# of overall votes	% of overall vote	# of overall seats won	+/–	Government
1994	2,005	0.04%	0 / 386		extra-parliamentary

== Sources ==
- Vida, István (2011). "Magyar Családok Országos Szövetsége (MACSOSZ)". Magyarországi politikai pártok lexikona (1846–2010) [Encyclopedia of the Political Parties in Hungary (1846–2010)] (in Hungarian). Gondolat Kiadó. pp. 384–385. ISBN 978-963-693-276-3.
