= Medveczky =

The Medveczky family was a Hungarian aristocratic family living mostly in Upper Hungary (present day Slovakia) and Hungary. It was mentioned in the thirteenth century (about 1280–1290), when the family was given the title of squire. In 1355, King Louis the Great gave Ladislav and Urban Medveczky a noble title. They were also given a forest land of area 10 poplužie, situated by the Medveczky brook in Orava. In 1370, their brother Opilius was also elevated into a nobleman.

The Medveczky family was an owner of the area of Maly Bysterec that is nowadays a part of Dolný Kubín (Hungarian: Alsókubin). Maly Bysterec was originally settled as a squiral settlement that was separated from Orava Castle estate. In 1355, this land was given to Jakub and Miko defined as an area of 10 units poplužie by the Bysterec brook, which rises in Kubinska Hola.

Many family members used the title "Medveczei és Kis Bisterczei" or "Kis Bisterczai és Medveczei" referred as "Medveczky from Medvedzie" and "Maly Bysterec" or vice versa till the end of World War I. After World War I, the main head of the family used the title of the Right Honourable Count Medveczky, indicating their nobility whilst living abroad.

Notable people with the surname include:

- Diourka Medveczky (1930–2018), Hungarian sculptor and filmmaker
- Erika Medveczky, Hungarian canoeist
- Ilona Medveczky (born 1941), Hungarian dancer and actress
- Jenő Medveczky, Hungarian painter
- Krisztina Medveczky, Hungarian artistic gymnast
- Pauline Aïda Simone Medveczky, birth name of * Pauline Lafont (1963–1988), French actress
