= Hungarian Party of the Unemployed =

Hungarian Party of the Unemployed Magyar Munkanélküliek Pártja
- Chairman: Nándor Buda
- Founded: 23 August 1993
- Dissolved: 6 January 2004

The Hungarian Party of the Unemployed (Hungarian: Magyar Munkanélküliek Pártja; MMNP) was an extra-parliamentary political party in Hungary, which existed officially between 1993 and 2004. It contested the 1994 parliamentary election with only one candidate, László Mercz in Miskolc, who gained 190 votes. The MMNP did not contest any further elections and the party became technically defunct.

== Election results ==
=== National Assembly ===
| Election year | National Assembly | | | | Government |
| Election year | # of overall votes | % of overall vote | # of overall seats won | +/– | Government |
|---|---|---|---|---|---|
| 1994 | 190 | 0.01% | 0 / 386 | | extra-parliamentary |

== Sources ==
- Vida, István (2011). "Magyar Munkanélküliek Pártja (MMNP)". Magyarországi politikai pártok lexikona (1846–2010) [Encyclopedia of the Political Parties in Hungary (1846–2010)] (in Hungarian). Gondolat Kiadó. p. 404. ISBN 978-963-693-276-3.
