= Democratic Party (Hungary) =

Democratic Party Demokrata Párt
- President: Vilmos Bereczki
- Founded: 6 September 1993
- Dissolved: December 1994
- Split from: Democratic Smallholders' and Party (DKPP)
- Ideology: Democratic liberalism
- Political position: Centre-left

The Democratic Party (Hungarian: Demokrata Párt; DEMP), was a short-lived political party in Hungary between 1993 and 1994.

== History ==
The Democratic Party's legal predecessor was the short-lived Democratic Smallholders' and Party (DKPP) which was established by former moderate liberal members of Independent Smallholders, Agrarian Workers and Civic Party (FKGP) on 19 January 1993. The DKPP criticized József Torgyán's leadership. The DKPP split when MP Vilmos Bereczki and his supporters founded the DEMP on 6 September 1993.

The DEMP had four individual candidates in the 1994 parliamentary election, who received 0.02 percent of the votes, failing to win a seat. Just before the December 1994 local elections, the DEMP was officially dissolved.

== Election results ==
=== National Assembly ===
Election year	National Assembly				Government
Election year	# of overall votes	% of overall vote	# of overall seats won	+/–	Government
1994	1,150	0.02%	0 / 386		extra-parliamentary

== Sources ==
- Vida, István (2011). "Demokrata Párt (DEMP)". Magyarországi politikai pártok lexikona (1846–2010) [Encyclopedia of the Political Parties in Hungary (1846–2010)] (in Hungarian). Gondolat Kiadó. p. 341. ISBN 978-963-693-276-3.
