= László Orbán (politician) =

Hungarian politician (1912–1978)

Minister of Culture of Hungary
- In office 21 June 1974 – 22 July 1976
- Preceded by: post created
- Succeeded by: Imre Pozsgay

Personal details
- Born: 2 August 1912 Nógrádverőce, Austria-Hungary
- Died: 18 November 1978 (aged 66) Budapest, People's Republic of Hungary
- Party: KMP, MKP, MDP, MSZMP
- Profession: politician

László Orbán (2 August 1912 – 18 November 1978) was a Hungarian politician, who served as Minister of Culture between 1974 and 1976. He was a member of the National Assembly of Hungary between 1943 and 1953 and from 1958 until his death.

Political offices
Preceded by post created	Minister of Culture; 1974–1976	Succeeded by Imre Pozsgay
