= Electoral Coalition for the Hungarians =

Electoral Coalition for the Hungarians Magyarságért Választási Szövetség
- Founded: March 1993
- Dissolved: 1994
- Political position: Right-wing

The Electoral Coalition for the Hungarians (Hungarian: Magyarságért Választási Szövetség; MVSZ) was a short-lived electoral coalition in Hungary, formed by the Hungarian Freedom Party, which split from the Freedom Party (SZP) earlier to contest the 1994 parliamentary election.

Its sole candidate in Miskolc received only 211 votes, and the electoral coalition was dissolved shortly thereafter.

== Election results ==
=== National Assembly ===
Election year	National Assembly				Government
Election year	# of overall votes	% of overall vote	# of overall seats won	+/–	Government
1994	211	0,01%	0 / 386		extra-parliamentary

== Sources ==
- Vida, István (2011). "Magyarságért Választási Szövetség (MVSZ)". Magyarországi politikai pártok lexikona (1846–2010) [Encyclopedia of the Political Parties in Hungary (1846–2010)] (in Hungarian). Gondolat Kiadó. p. 432. ISBN 978-963-693-276-3.
