= Compromise Independent Smallholders' Party =

Compromise Independent Smallholders' Party Kiegyezés Független Kisgazdapárt
- Leader: Sándor Cseh
- Founded: 2 October 1993
- Dissolved: 13 March 2003
- Split from: Independent Smallholders, Agrarian Workers and Civic Party (FKGP)
- Ideology: Agrarianism; Liberal conservativism
- Political position: Centre-right

The Compromise Independent Smallholders' Party (Hungarian: Kiegyezés Független Kisgazdapárt; KFKGP), was an agrarianist political party in Hungary, after having its members left the Independent Smallholders, Agrarian Workers and Civic Party (FKGP).

== History ==
The party was founded on 2 October 1993 in Debrecen by gardener Sándor Cseh, who was replaced as vice-president and expelled from FKGP on 11 June 1992, following a failed coup attempt against party leader József Torgyán. The cooperation negotiations have broken down with the pro-government faction Group of 36 MPs, who, as a result, also founded a separate party, named the United Smallholders' Party (EKGP). The KFKGP intended to unite the smallholders' group which opposed the leadership and influence of Torgyán in the agrarian politics.

For the 1994 parliamentary election, the KFKGP set up two regional county lists (Hajdú-Bihar and Szabolcs-Szatmár-Bereg) and its seven individual candidates run in the election. The party received 0.11 percent of the votes and won no seats. Following that failure, the party gradually became defunct and dissolved in 2003, after it did not participate in the 1998 and 2002 national elections.

== Election results ==
=== National Assembly ===
Election year	National Assembly				Government
Election year	# of overall votes	% of overall vote	# of overall seats won	+/–	Government
1994	5,918	0.11%	0 / 386		extra-parliamentary

== Sources ==
- Vida, István (2011). "Kiegyezés Független Kisgazdapárt (KFKGP)". Magyarországi politikai pártok lexikona (1846–2010) [Encyclopedia of the Political Parties in Hungary (1846–2010)] (in Hungarian). Gondolat Kiadó. p. 371. ISBN 978-963-693-276-3.
