= János Petrenkó =

Hungarian industrialist, inventor, and politician (1940–2020)

Member of the National Assembly
- In office 2 May 1990 – 27 June 1994

Personal details
- Born: 30 March 1940 Ózd, Hungary
- Died: 3 March 2020 (aged 79)
- Party: MSZMP (1962–89); MSZP (1989–92); Republican Party (1992–?)
- Profession: industrialist, politician

János Petrenkó (30 March 1940 – 3 March 2020) was a Hungarian industrialist, inventor and politician, member of the National Assembly (MP) from 1990 to 1994. He was noted as owner of the first private large company, the rolling mill for heavy products within the Ózd Metallurgical Works after the fall of communism in Hungary.

== Career ==
Petrenkó was born into a mining family with eight children in Ózd on 30 March 1940. His parents were György Petrenkó and Jolán Král. He grew up in the mining settlement of Bánszállás (today a borough in Ózd). He finished elementary studies there. He studied electro-mechanical engineering since 1958, at the age of 14. He worked for Ózd Metallurgical Works for 25 years. He joined Hungarian Communist Workers' Party (MSZMP) in 1962.

He co-founded his company PEKO Works at Arló in 1971, a small manufacture of high wear materials. Becoming a full-time private small entrepreneur, he owned the company from 1979 to 1989. He bought the rolling mill for heavy products section of the Ózd Metallurgical Works under bankruptcy proceedings for 100 million HUF in 1989, becoming the first private industrialist tycoon in Hungary following the transition to democracy. After lengthy legal and political wrangling, he took over the company under the name PEKO Steel Works on 1 January 1990. He also founded and owned PEKO Business, an export-import trading house for the company. Petrenkó was also a noted inventor in heavy industry production, he had 187 technological innovations and 7 patents in metal drilling and plasma cutting until the end of Communism. Petrenkó was a founding member of the presidium of the National Association of Hungarian Manufacturers (MGYOSZ) since 1991. He was also a member of Communist-affiliated trade union National Association of Craftsmen (KIOSZ).

Petrenkó retained his membership of MSZMP until its abolition. He became a founding member of the legal successor Hungarian Socialist Party (MSZP) in October 1989. He unsuccessfully ran as an independent candidate (supported by MSZP) in Ózd constituency (Borsod-Abaúj-Zemplén County) during the 1990 parliamentary election, but was elected MP via his party's Borsod-Abaúj-Zemplén County Regional List. Petrenkó left the Socialist Party and its caucus on 27 April 1992, citing the existence of difficulty of boosting the economy, limited by party interests. Petrenkó joined extra parliamentary Republican Party in November 1992. He was a member of the parliamentary Economic Committee for a short time between October and December 1992.

== Personal life ==
Petrenkó married manager Magdolna Varga. They had two sons, Tibor (born 1966) and Tamás (born 1971); both of them were officials at PEKO Works in the 1990s. Petrenkó died on 3 March 2020, at age 79.
