= National Democratic Alliance (Hungary) =

National Democratic Alliance Nemzeti Demokrata Szövetség
- Co-Presidents: Zoltán Bíró; Imre Pozsgay
- Founded: 17 May 1991
- Dissolved: 20 January 1996
- Newspaper: Kiegyezés
- Ideology: Third Way
- Political position: Centre to Centre-left

The National Democratic Alliance (Hungarian: Nemzeti Demokrata Szövetség; NDSZ) was a short-lived centre-left party in Hungary, founded and led by Zoltán Bíró and Imre Pozsgay, defectors from the Hungarian Democratic Forum (MDF) and the Hungarian Socialist Party (MSZP), respectively.

== History ==
The NDSZ was formed on 17 May 1991 by intellectuals from both left–right political spectrum, including Sándor Sára, Barna Tálas, Sándor Püski, István Kukorelli and András Mezei. By 1993, in addition to Pozsgay, three other Members of Parliament; Kata Beke, a former Political Secretary of State of Education, Péter Szél and Zoltán Varga had joined the party, all of them from the MDF.

The party wanted to retain the spirit of the Hungarian Round Table Talks and the Lakitelek meeting, the benefits of peaceful democratic change. The NDSZ had a third way ideology and advocated a varying synthesis of right-wing economic and left-wing social policies. For instance, the party supported leftist welfare measures (e.g. extension of primary health care and rejection of rapid capitalization), while also spoke out for the rights of ethnic Hungarian minorities in neighboring countries.

Despite its well-known politicians and public figures, the NDSZ have failed to win any seats in the 1994 parliamentary election, receiving only 0.52 percent of the votes. The NDSZ dissolved on 20 January 1996.

== Election results ==
=== National Assembly ===
Election year	National Assembly				Government
Election year	# of overall votes	% of overall vote	# of overall seats won	+/–	Government
1994	28,075	0.52% (#14)	0 / 386		Extra-parliamentary

== Sources ==
- Vida, István (2011). "Nemzeti Demokrata Szövetség (NDSZ)". Magyarországi politikai pártok lexikona (1846–2010) [Encyclopedia of the Political Parties in Hungary (1846–2010)] (in Hungarian). Gondolat Kiadó. p. 435. ISBN 978-963-693-276-3.
