= Gypsy Solidarity Party =

Defunct political party in Hungary

Gypsy Solidarity Party Cigányok Szolidaritási Pártja
- Chairman: Ferenc Buri
- Founded: 16 February 1994; 32 years ago
- Dissolved: 29 July 2003; 23 years ago
- Ideology: Romani minority interests

The Gypsy Solidarity Party (Hungarian: Cigányok Szolidaritási Pártja; CSZP), was a political party in Hungary for the ethnic Romani minority that existed between 1994 and 2003.

== History ==
The CSZP was founded by members of the Phralipe Independent Gypsy Organization in Budapest on 14 February 1994 to contest the May 1994 parliamentary election. Romani writer and poet Béla Osztojkán, who formerly left the Alliance of Free Democrats (SZDSZ) in 1993, was among the founding members. The CSZP participated in the 1994 national election with four individual candidates, who received 0.08 percent of the votes. After that the party did not contest any further elections.

== Election results ==
=== National Assembly ===
Election year	National Assembly				Government
Election year	# of overall votes	% of overall vote	# of overall seats won	+/–	Government
1994	3,282	0,08%	0 / 386		extra-parliamentary

== Sources ==
- Vida, István (2011). "Cigányok Szolidaritási Pártja (CSZP)". Magyarországi politikai pártok lexikona (1846–2010) [Encyclopedia of the Political Parties in Hungary (1846–2010)] (in Hungarian). Gondolat Kiadó. pp. 338–339. ISBN 978-963-693-276-3.
