= Conservative Party – Alliance of Farmers and Civilians =

Conservative Party – Alliance of Farmers and Civilians Konzervatív Párt, Gazdák és Polgárok Szövetsége
- Leader: László Csizmadia
- Founded: 13 September 1993
- Dissolved: 1995
- Ideology: Liberal conservatism
- Political position: Centre to Centre-right

The Conservative Party – Alliance of Farmers and Civilians (Hungarian: Konzervatív Párt, Gazdák és Polgárok Szövetsége; KP–GPSZ) was a liberal conservative centre party in Hungary.

The party intended to represent the interests of entrepreneurs and businessmen. It supported increasing privatization and minimize the economic role of the state. The KP–GPSZ contested the 1994 parliamentary election with 13 individual candidates and four regional county lists, failing to win a seat. The party disappeared shortly thereafter.

== Election results ==
=== National Assembly ===
Election year	National Assembly				Government
Election year	# of overall votes	% of overall vote	# of overall seats won	+/–	Government
1994	2,046	0.04%	0 / 386		extra-parliamentary

== Sources ==
- Vida, István (2011). "Konzervatív Párt, Gazdák és Polgárok Szövetsége (KP–GPSZ)". Magyarországi politikai pártok lexikona (1846–2010) [Encyclopedia of the Political Parties in Hungary (1846–2010)] (in Hungarian). Gondolat Kiadó. pp. 374–375. ISBN 978-963-693-276-3.
