= Party for Historic Hungary =

Party for Historic Hungary Történelmi Magyarországért Párt
- Chairman: Ernő Diószegi
- Founded: 10 March 1990
- Dissolved: 30 May 2003
- Ideology: National conservatism
- Political position: Right-wing

The Party for Historic Hungary (Hungarian: Történelmi Magyarországért Párt; TMP) was a national conservative political party in Hungary, existed officially between 1990 and 2003.

The TMP was founded by pensioner Ernő Diószegi. It contested the 1994 parliamentary election with only one candidate, János Varga in Kőszeg, who gained 203 votes. The TMP did not contest any further elections, the party became technically defunct. Diószegi died on 12 July 2001. The party was officially dissolved by the Metropolitan Court of Budapest on 30 May 2003.

== Election results ==
=== National Assembly ===
Election year	National Assembly				Government
Election year	# of overall votes	% of overall vote	# of overall seats won	+/–	Government
1994	203	0.01%	0 / 386		extra-parliamentary

== Sources ==
- Vida, István (2011). "Történelmi Magyarországért Párt (TMP)". Magyarországi politikai pártok lexikona (1846–2010) [Encyclopedia of the Political Parties in Hungary (1846–2010)] (in Hungarian). Gondolat Kiadó. p. 461. ISBN 978-963-693-276-3.
