= Republican Party (Hungary) =

Republican Party Köztársaság Párt
- First leader: János Palotás
- Last leader: György Magyar
- Founded: 3 August 1992
- Dissolved: 20 October 2003
- Ideology: Conservative liberalism
- Political position: Centre

The Republican Party (Hungarian: Köztársaság Párt, pronounced [ˈkøstaːrʃɒʃaːɡ ˈpaːrt]; KP) was a conservative liberal centre party in Hungary.

== History ==
The Republican Party was founded by entrepreneurs, businessmen and intellectuals on 3 August 1992, at the initiative of economist and Member of Parliament János Palotás, who formerly had been a non-partisan member of the governing Hungarian Democratic Forum (MDF) parliamentary group. As President of the National Association of Entrepreneurs, Palotás became a well-known public figure during the so-called "Taxi blockade" in October 1990, when laid the foundations of his popularity by decisive action, supporting the taxi drivers' demands. Because of the increasing conflicts, Palotás left the MDF caucus on 8 March 1992. Economist László Fodor, also Secretary General of the Hungarian Chamber of Commerce, professor of psychiatry András Veér and lawyer Péter Bárándy became members of the leadership. Three other MPs, László Czoma (Ind.), János Petrenkó (MSZP) and Mihály Mózes (SZDSZ) also joined the Republican Party.

Its campaign strategy included the takeover of the US model, well-organized media activities and regular thematic press conferences. The KP described itself as a "pragmatist" party without historical and ideological dogmas. Prior to the 1994 parliamentary election, the Republican Party began negotiations on electoral cooperation with leaders of the Agrarian Alliance (ASZ), the Alliance of Free Democrats (SZDSZ) and the Hungarian Socialist Party (MSZP). The KP was able to nominee 83 candidates, 17 county regional lists and also set up a national list in the 1994 election. The Republican Party received 137,484 votes (2.55%) thus did not reach the electoral threshold. In the 1994 local election, lawyer György Magyar was the party's candidate for the position of mayor of Budapest.

Palotás resigned as party leader on 15 May 1996, following charges of tax fraud concerning his companies. After the brief interim leadership of Róbert Frenkl, György Magyar was elected as the chairman of the party. The Republican Party was one of the founding members of the 13-member electoral coalition Union for Hungary (EMU) in October 1997, however the newly established organization received only 0.19 percent of the votes in the 1998 parliamentary election. After the failure, the Republican Party has gradually disappeared from the public life. It was officially abolished by the Metropolitan Court of Budapest in October 2003.

== Election results ==
=== National Assembly ===
Election year	National Assembly				Government
Election year	# of overall votes	% of overall vote	# of overall seats won	+/–	Government
1994	137,484	2.55% (#8)	0 / 386		extra-parliamentary
1998	Union for Hungary		0 / 386	0	extra-parliamentary

== Sources ==
- Vida, István (2011). "Köztársaság Párt (KP92)". Magyarországi politikai pártok lexikona (1846–2010) [Encyclopedia of the Political Parties in Hungary (1846–2010)] (in Hungarian). Gondolat Kiadó. pp. 376–377. ISBN 978-963-693-276-3.
