= Tápiószentmárton =

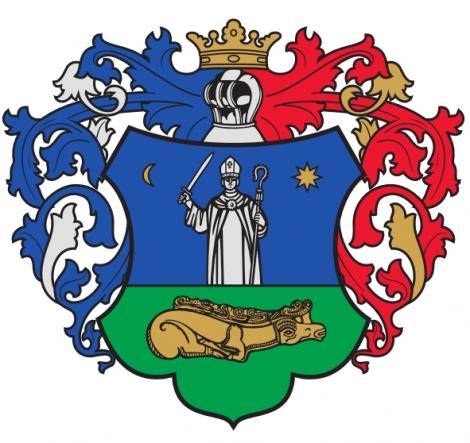
- Coat of arms

- Location of Tápiószentmárton in Hungary
- Coordinates: 47°20′25.55″N 19°44′37.54″E
- Country: Hungary
- Region: Central Hungary
- County: Pest
- Subregion: Nagykátai
- Rank: Town

Area
  - Total: 104.45 km^{2} (40.33 sq mi)

Population (1 January 2008)
  - Total: 5,502
  - Density: 52.68/km^{2} (136.4/sq mi)
- Time zone: UTC+1 (CET)
  - Summer (DST): UTC+2 (CEST)
- Postal code: 2711
- Area code: +36 29
- KSH code: 14571
- Website: www.tapioszentmarton.hu

Tápiószentmárton is a village in Pest county, Hungary.

== Locate ==
It can be approached by the main road no. 4. The most practical way to get there is using the Budapest-Újszász-Szolnok train line. Travel to Nagykáta, then with bus. Tápiószentmárton has its own train station, but it is far away from the central.
