= Party of the Hungarian Interest =

Party of the Hungarian Interest A Magyar Érdek Pártja
- President: Izabella B. Király
- Founded: 7 September 1993
- Dissolved: 9 January 2005
- Headquarters: Abony, Hungary
- Newspaper: Kötött Kéve
- Ideology: Hungarian nationalism Antisemitism; Anti-capitalism
- Political position: Far-right

The Party of the Hungarian Interest (Hungarian: A Magyar Érdek Pártja; AMÉP), was a far-right Hungarian radical nationalist political party between 1993 and 2005.

== History ==
The AMÉP was established in Pilisszentlászló by Member of Parliament Izabella B. Király, who was expelled from the governing Hungarian Democratic Forum (MDF) on 22 June 1993 due to her extremist views and speeches in parliamentary debates. The party's ideology was described by scholars and media outlets as anti-Westernist and antisemitic. Király maintained good relationship with major underground neo-Nazi skinhead groups and she also supported Hungarian irredentism in her parliamentary speeches. The party published its programme on 22 June 1996 in Visegrád ("108 points of Mogyoróhegy"), where they demanded direct presidential elections and abolition of parliamentary immunity. The AMÉP rejected political party pluralism, it supported the increasing of independent candidates in each constituencies instead. The AMÉP intended to rename itself as "National Assembly of the Hungarians" on 23 October 1996, but the Pest County Court did not allow this because of the misleading nature of the proposed name.

The party contested the 1994 parliamentary election with only one candidate (Király) in Nagykőrös, who failed to win a seat. It did not participate in the 1998 parliamentary election. For the 2002 parliamentary election, the AMÉP was able to nominee only Király as individual candidate again, who received 3.69 percent of the votes in Nagykőrös constituency, gaining no seats. After the 2002 national election, the AMÉP had no political activity. Izabella Király retired from politics in 2003. The party was dissolved on 9 January 2005. Its party foundation, the Hungarian Future in Hungarian Past disestablished in 2009.

== International relations ==
Following the 2003 invasion of Iraq, a leaked document revealed in January 2004 that Király's party received benefits and financial support from Iraqi President Saddam Hussein's Ba'ath Party for its mediator role in sale of 4,700,000 barrels (750,000 m3) of oil. Formerly Király admitted that she had been in Iraq several times since the second half of the 1990s. In November 2002, she also criticized the United States' Middle-East politics and planned intervention in Iraq. According to the local daily which published the beneficiaries' list, the AMÉP and the other pro-Saddam persons and organizations had to oppose the United States' foreign policy while demanding lifting of oil embargo against Iraq, in exchange for the Iraqi government's financial support.

== Election results ==
=== National Assembly ===
Election year	National Assembly				Government
Election year	# of overall votes	% of overall vote	# of overall seats won	+/–	Government
1994	416	0.01%	0 / 386		extra-parliamentary
2002	919	0.02%	0 / 386	0	extra-parliamentary

== Sources ==
- Vida, István (2011). "A Magyar Érdek Pártja (AMÉP)". Magyarországi politikai pártok lexikona (1846–2010) [Encyclopedia of the Political Parties in Hungary (1846–2010)] (in Hungarian). Gondolat Kiadó. p. 334. ISBN 978-963-693-276-3.
