= Tamás Szabó (politician) =

Hungarian physician and politician

Member of the National Assembly
- In office 14 May 2010 – 5 May 2014

Personal details
- Born: 2 May 1957 (age 68) Recsk, Hungary
- Party: Fidesz
- Profession: physician

Dr. Tamás Szabó (born 2 May 1957) is a Hungarian physician and politician, member of the National Assembly (MP) for Jászberény (Jász-Nagykun-Szolnok County Constituency I) from 2010 to 2014, and also mayor of the town since 2010.

He was elected a member of the Committee on Health on 14 May 2010.
