= Jenő Medveczky =

Hungarian painter (1902–1969)

- Born: Jenő Medveczky; 1902; Savnik
- Died: 1969 (aged 66–67); Budapest
- Movement: School of RomeNeoclassicism

Jenő Medveczky (1902-1969) was a Hungarian painter significant to Hungarian neo-classic painting.
