= United Smallholders' Party =

United Historical Smallholders and Civic Party Egyesült Történelmi Kisgazda és Polgári Párt
- First leader: János Szabó
- Last leader: Zsolt Rajkai
- Founded: 6 November 1993
- Dissolved: 2 August 2003
- Split from: Independent Smallholders, Agrarian Workers and Civic Party (FKGP)
- Ideology: Agrarianism; National conservativism
- Political position: Centre-right
- Colours: Green

The United Historical Smallholders and Civic Party (Hungarian: Egyesült Történelmi Kisgazda és Polgári Párt, pronounced [ˈɛɟːɛʃylt ˈtørteːnɛlmi ˈkiʒɡɒzdɒ ˈeːʃ ˈpolɡaːri ˈpaːrt]), known mostly by its acronym EKGP or its shortened form United Smallholders' Party (Hungarian: Egyesült Kisgazdapárt), was an agrarianist political party in Hungary, after having several MPs and cabinet members left the Independent Smallholders, Agrarian Workers and Civic Party (FKGP) to continue to support the conservative cabinet of József Antall.

== History ==
Following the decision of FKGP party leader József Torgyán, who withdrew his party's support from the Antall cabinet, which was composed of three parties (MDF, FKGP and KDNP), the parliamentary caucus of the FKGP split into two groups on 24 February 1992. The majority of the caucus, the Group of 33 MPs, later 36 MPs continued to support the government, while FKGP (Group of 12 MPs then 10 MPs) went into opposition. The pro-government faction formed the United Smallholders' Party as a formal organizational unit on 6 November 1993. Minister of Agriculture János Szabó was elected as the first party chairman on 19 December 1993, while István Böröcz became leader of the EKGP parliamentary group. 22 members of the Group of 36 MPs joined the new party. Following the death of Antall, the EKGP remained a supporter of the Péter Boross government.

During the 1994 parliamentary election, the EKGP received only 0.82 percent of the votes, while its main rival the Torgyán-led FKGP again entered the parliament with 8.82 percent of the votes. On 17 December 1994, Szabó was replaced by Géza Zsiros. On 4 February 1996, Zsolt Rajkai became the new chairman. The EKGP had been eroded for the coming years. It was unable to run candidates in the following 1998 and 2002 parliamentary elections, as a result the Metropolitan Court of Budapest dissolved the party on 2 August 2003.

== Party leaders ==
Period	Chairman	Executive Vice-Chairman	Vice-Chairmen	Secretary-General
1993–1994	János Szabó	István Böröcz	Gyula Kiss; Zsolt Rajkai; László Horváth	Antal Bélafi
1994–1996	Géza Zsiros	István Tar	Elemér Gergátz; Árpád Hadházy; István Pohankovics	Béla Utassy
1996–?	Zsolt Rajkai	Sándor Zsámboki	Elemér Gergátz; Árpád Hadházy; István Pohankovics	Béla Utassy

== Election results ==
=== National Assembly ===
Election year	National Assembly				Government
Election year	# of overall votes	% of overall vote	# of overall seats won	+/–	Government
1994	44,315	0.82% (#12)	0 / 386		extra-parliamentary

== Sources ==
- Vida, István (2011). "Egyesült Történelmi Kisgazda és Polgári Párt (EKGP)". Magyarországi politikai pártok lexikona (1846–2010) [Encyclopedia of the Political Parties in Hungary (1846–2010)] (in Hungarian). Gondolat Kiadó. p. 343. ISBN 978-963-693-276-3.
