= 1994 Hungarian parliamentary election =

- 8 May 1994 (first round); 29 May 1994 (second round)

All 386 seats to the National Assembly 194 seats needed for a majority
- Turnout: 68.92% (first round); 55.12% (second round)
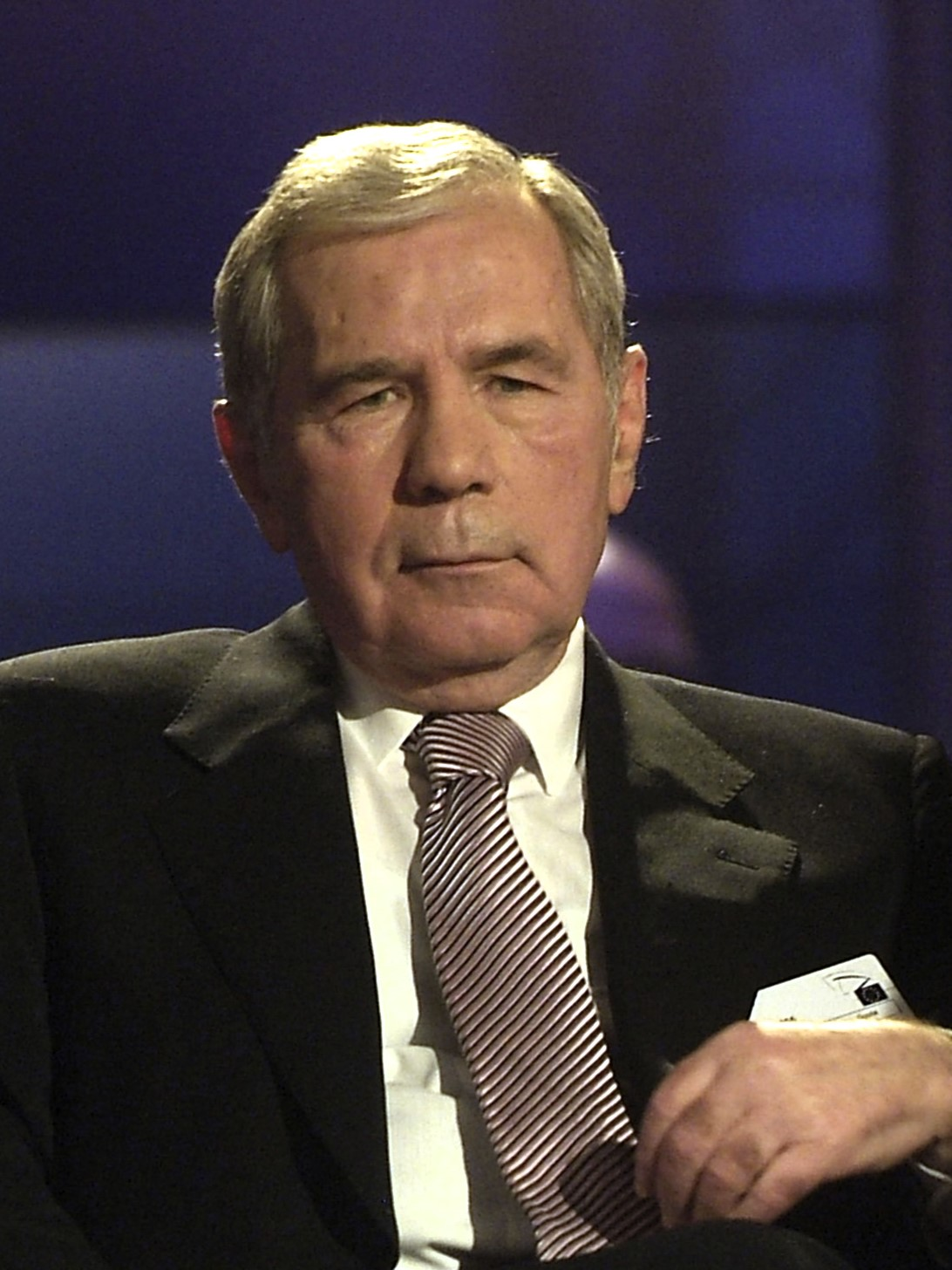

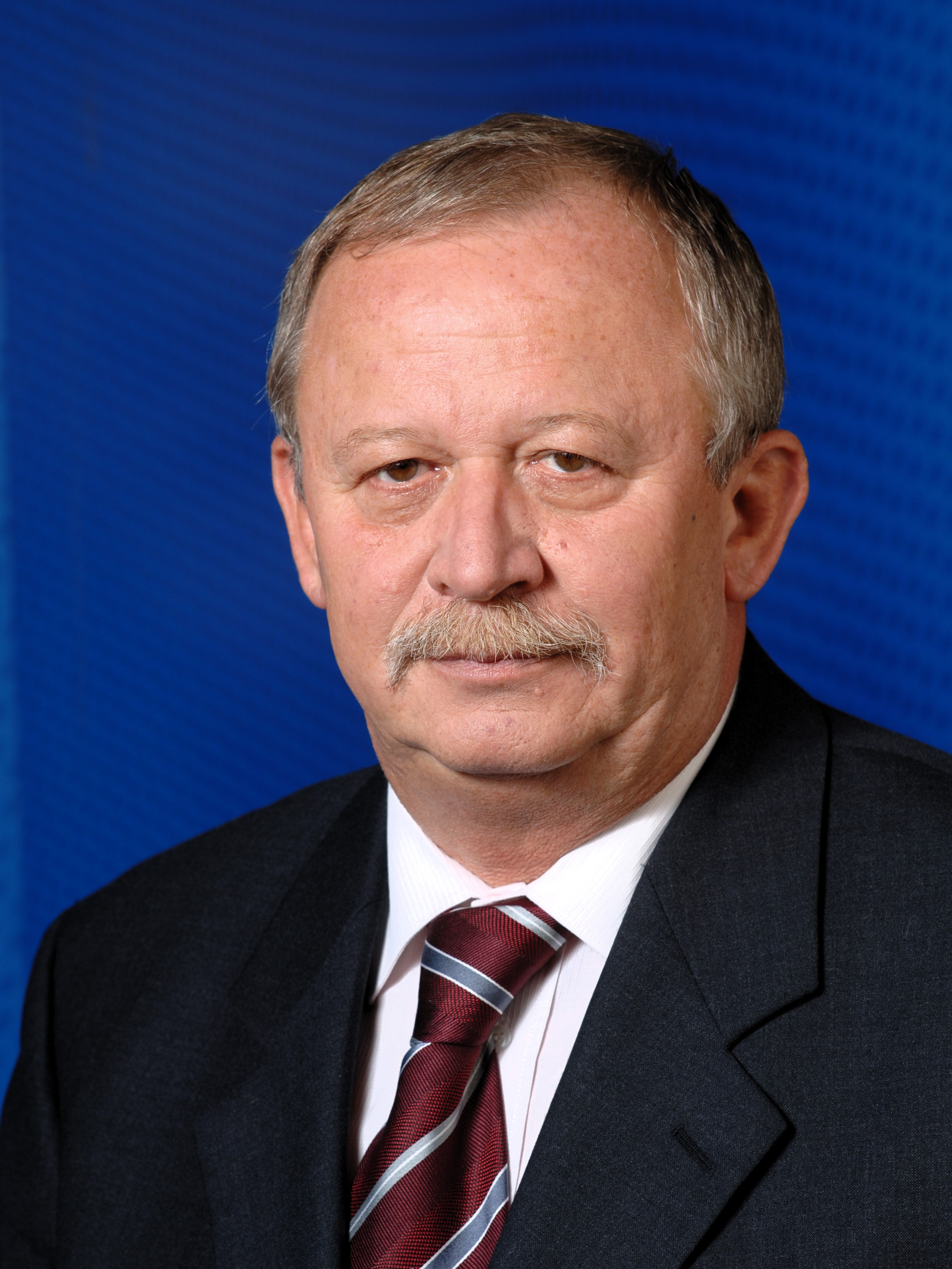

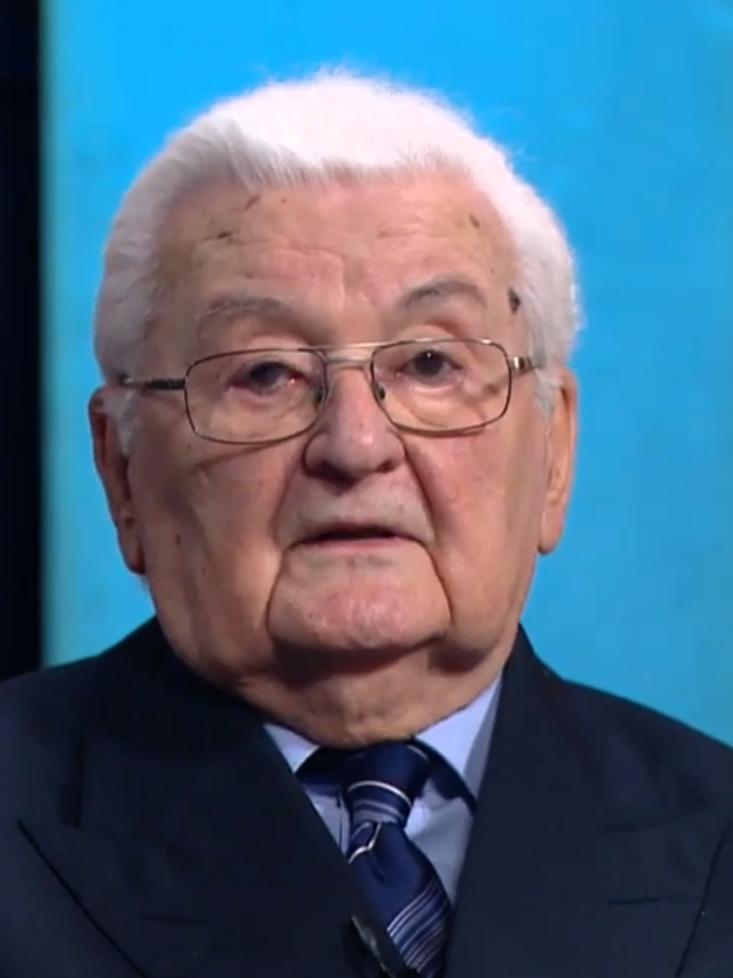

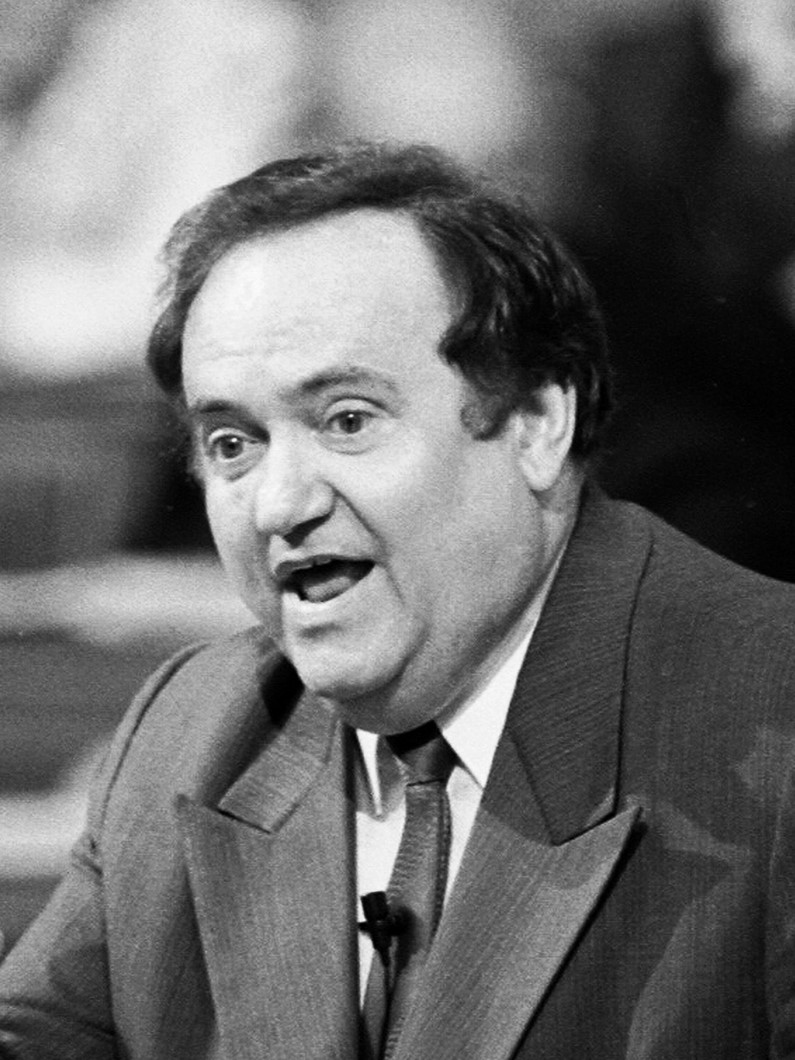

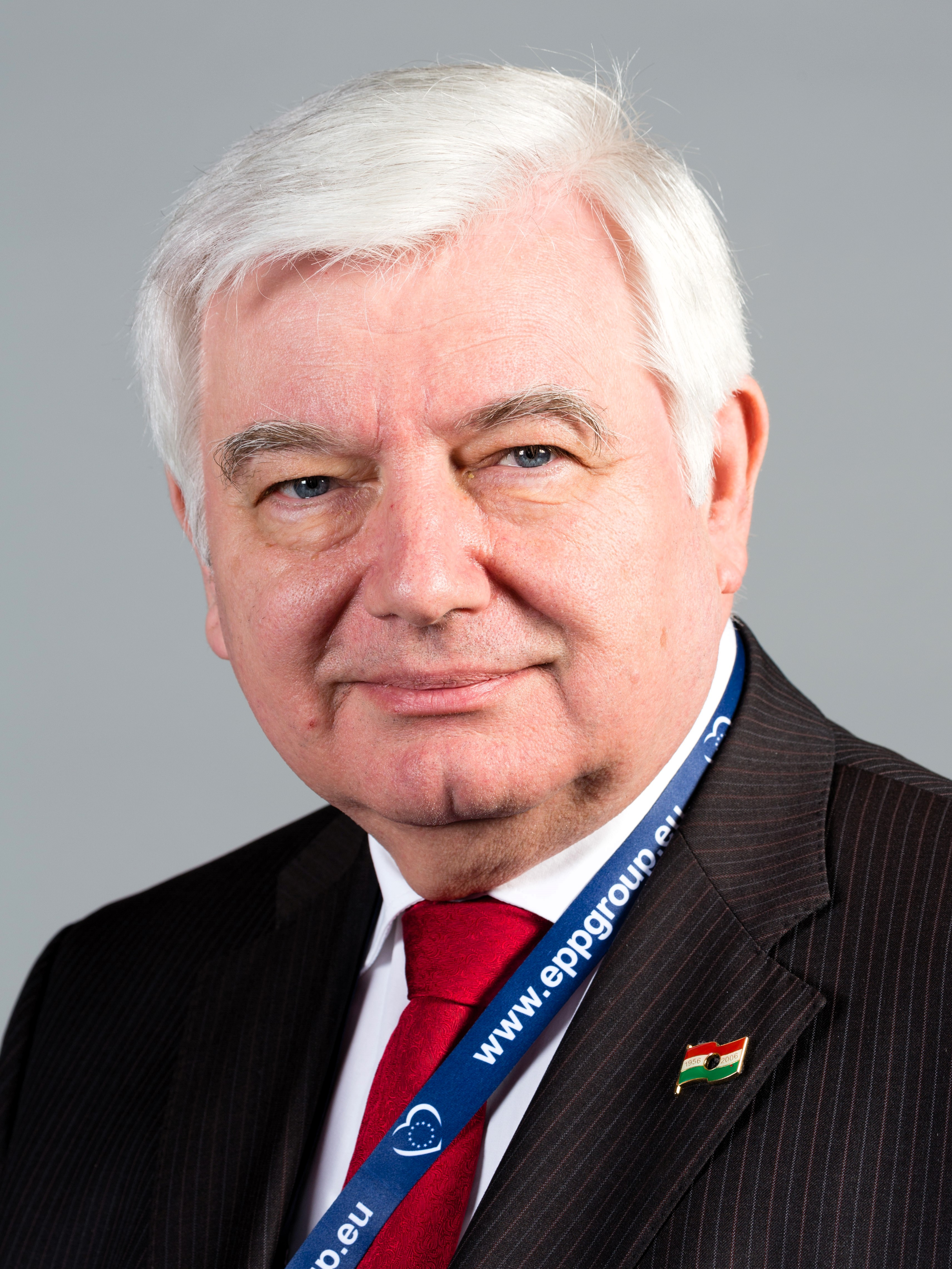

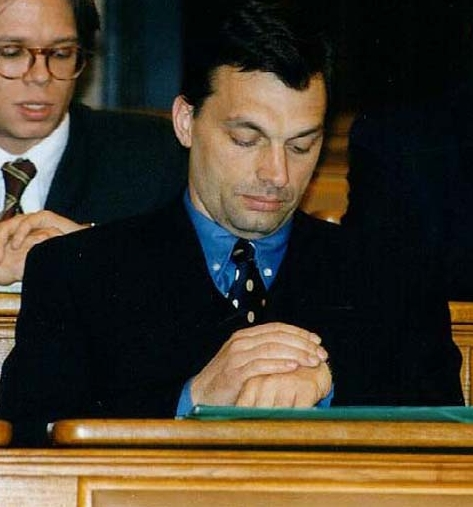
	First party	Second party	Third party
Leader	Gyula Horn	Gábor Kuncze	Péter Boross
Party	MSZP	SZDSZ	MDF
Leader since	27 May 1990	(Note: Kuncze was lead candidate for SZDSZ, but was not party leader.)	12 December 1993 (Note: Boross had been Prime Minister since 12 December 1993, but was not party leader.)
Last election	33 seats, 10.89%	94 seats, 21.40%	164 seats, 24.73%
Seats won	209	70	38
Seat change	▲176	▼24 (Note: Including 1 deputy who elected as Agrarian Alliance candidate, but joined to the SZDSZ parliamentary group before the assembly session opened.)	▼126
1R vote and %	1,688,835 (31.3%)	1,005,658 (18.6%)	649,872 (12.0%)
2R vote and %	1,943,757 (45.3%)	1,221,069 (28.5%)	639,866 (14.9%)
Party vote	1,781,504	1,065,889	633,770
% and swing	32.99% ▲22.10 pp	19.74% ▼1.66 pp	11.74% ▼12.99 pp
	Fourth party	Fifth party	Sixth party
Leader	József Torgyán	László Surján	Viktor Orbán
Party	FKGP	KDNP	Fidesz
Leader since	26 April 1991	27 May 1990	18 April 1993
Last election	44 seats, 11.73%	21 seats, 6.46%	22 seats, 8.95%
Seats won	26	22	20
Seat change	▼18	▲1	▼2
1R vote and %	425,346 (7.9%)	397,873 (7.4%)	416,116 (7.7%)
2R vote and %	252,405 (5.9%)	126,616 (3.0%)	29,391 (0.7%)
Party vote	476,272	379,523	379,344
% and swing	8.82% ▼2.91 pp	7.03% ▲0.57 pp	7.02% ▼1.93 pp
- Results of the election. A darker shade indicates a higher vote share. Proportional list results are displayed in the top left.
Government before election
Boross Government
MDF–EKGP–KDNP
Government after election
Horn Government
MSZP–SZDSZ

Parliamentary elections were held in Hungary on 8 May 1994, with a second round of voting in 174 of the 176 single member constituencies on 29 May. They resulted in the return to power of the Hungarian Socialist Party, the former Communist party, under the leadership of Gyula Horn, who became prime minister. The Socialists achieved a remarkable revival, winning an overall majority of 209 seats out of 386, up from 33 in 1990.

The governing Hungarian Democratic Forum was severely defeated, falling from 165 seats to 38 for third place. It was also a disappointment for the principal opposition party of the previous parliament, the Alliance of Free Democrats, which failed to capitalize on the government's unpopularity and lost seats. Poor economic performance, apparent government incompetence and a certain nostalgia for the social security of the communist era appear to be the main reasons for the result, together with significant reform of the Socialists' policies, with commitment to the expansion for the market economy and continued compensation for the victims of communism.

With a majority of 15, the Socialists had enough seats to govern alone. Despite this, Horn decided to form a coalition with the Free Democrats, giving him a two-thirds majority. This was partly to assuage public concerns inside and outside Hungary over an ex-Communist party with an absolute majority, and partly to get his reform package past his own party's left wing.

== Electoral system ==
The unicameral National Assembly (Országgyűlés), the highest organ of state authority, initiates and approves legislation sponsored by the prime minister. A party had to win at least 5% of the national vote (based on the total of regional list votes) to form a parliamentary faction. The National Assembly had 386 members, elected for a four-year term in a mixed system: 176 members in single-seat constituencies by a modified two-round system, 152 in multi-seat constituencies by party-list proportional representation (using territorial lists) and 58 members (using a national list) to realize semi-proportional representation.

== Results ==
Party	Proportional			SMCs (first round)			SMCs (second round)			Seats		
Party	Votes	%	Seats	Votes	%	Seats	Votes	%	Seats	National	Total	+/–
Hungarian Socialist Party	1,781,504	32.99	53	1,688,835	31.27	2	1,943,757	45.34	147	7	209	+176
Alliance of Free Democrats	1,065,889	19.74	28	1,005,658	18.62	0	1,221,069	28.49	16	25	69	–25
Hungarian Democratic Forum	633,770	11.74	18	649,872	12.03	0	639,866	14.93	5	15	38	–126
Independent Smallholders' Party	476,272	8.82	14	425,346	7.88	0	252,405	5.89	1	11	26	–18
Christian Democratic People's Party	379,523	7.03	5	397,873	7.37	0	126,616	2.95	3	14	22	+1
Fidesz	379,344	7.02	7	416,116	7.70	0	29,391	0.69	0	13	20	–2
Workers' Party	172,109	3.19	0	177,416	3.28	0	6,268	0.15	0	0	0	0
Republican Party	137,561	2.55	0	104,253	1.93	0	9,774	0.23	0	0	0	New
Agrarian Alliance	113,384	2.10	0	132,173	2.45	0	14,544	0.34	1	0	1	–1
Hungarian Justice and Life Party	85,737	1.59	0	67,162	1.24	0				0	0	New
Social Democratic Party of Hungary	51,110	0.95	0	32,912	0.61	0				0	0	0
United Smallholders' Party	44,292	0.82	0	43,186	0.80	0				0	0	New
Liberal Civic Alliance–Entrepreneurs Party	33,367	0.62	0	42,951	0.80	0				0	0	New
National Democratic Alliance	28,075	0.52	0	32,258	0.60	0				0	0	New
Green Party of Hungary	8,809	0.16	0	4,766	0.09	0				0	0	0
Compromise Independent Smallholders' Party	5,918	0.11	0	4,386	0.08	0				0	0	New
Conservative Party	2,046	0.04	0	5,240	0.10	0				0	0	New
Green Alternative	849	0.02	0	2,638	0.05	0				0	0	New
Market Party	635	0.01	0	5,459	0.10	0				0	0	New
ASZ–SZDSZ				9,280	0.17	0	9,613	0.22	0	0	0	–
VP–ASZ–SZDSZ–Fidesz				6,440	0.12	0	7,666	0.18	1	0	1	–
SZDSZ–KP				4,664	0.09	0	5,494	0.13	0	0	0	–
Gypsy Solidarity Party				3,282	0.06	0				0	0	New
Independent Hungarian Democratic Party				2,366	0.04	0				0	0	0
Democratic Coalition Party				2,117	0.04	0				0	0	New
National Alliance of Hungarian Families				2,005	0.04	0				0	0	New
Historic Independent Smallholders' Party				1,792	0.03	0				0	0	New
VP–Fidesz				1,347	0.02	0				0	0	–
Pensioners' Party				1,245	0.02	0				0	0	0
Social Democratic Party				1,197	0.02	0				0	0	New
Democratic Party				1,150	0.02	0				0	0	New
EKGP–KDNP				840	0.02	0				0	0	–
Hungarian Socialist Workers' Party				704	0.01	0				0	0	New
Party of the Hungarian Interest				416	0.01	0				0	0	New
Union of Hungarian Biomedicists				334	0.01	0				0	0	New
Hungarian Mothers' National Party				265	0.00	0				0	0	New
Electoral Coalition for the Hungarians				211	0.00	0				0	0	New
Party for Historic Hungary				203	0.00	0				0	0	New
Hungarian Party of the Unemployed				190	0.00	0				0	0	New
National Forces' Movement				188	0.00	0				0	0	New
Independents				122,190	2.26	0	20,134	0.47	0	0	0	–6
Total	5,400,194	100.00	125	5,400,926	100.00	2	4,286,597	100.00	174	85	386	0
Valid votes	5,400,194	98.44		5,400,926	98.46		4,286,597	98.77				
Invalid/blank votes	85,344	1.56		84,692	1.54		53,299	1.23				
Total votes	5,485,538	100.00		5,485,618	100.00		4,339,896	100.00				
Registered voters/turnout	7,959,228	68.92		7,959,206	68.92		7,873,937	55.12				
Source: CLEA, Nohlen & Stöver

=== Party list results by county ===
County	MSZP	SZDSZ	MDF	FKGP	KDNP	Fidesz	MP	KP	ASZ	MIÉP	Others
Bács-Kiskun	26.70	18.07	12.82	12.36	7.63	6.57	3.00	1.87	3.38	1.60	6.00
Baranya	32.09	21.75	10.87	8.48	6.30	6.60	3.13	3.35	2.31	1.51	3.62
Békés	31.93	19.35	9.75	12.40	3.97	5.99	5.46	3.32	2.07	-	5.77
Borsod-Abaúj-Zemplén	40.12	16.26	9.60	6.93	8.89	6.95	4.31	1.79	2.14	-	3.00
Budapest	35.15	20.77	14.94	4.60	5.61	6.15	2.64	4.78	1.76	3.58	-
Csongrád	26.88	20.64	10.64	11.38	7.20	6.92	3.47	2.64	2.87	2.02	5.35
Fejér	33.37	19.52	9.85	10.42	5.62	10.01	2.63	2.88	2.03	1.59	2.08
Győr-Moson-Sopron	26.75	22.21	12.68	10.89	8.18	8.11	1.93	2.68	1.62	-	4.95
Hajdú-Bihar	35.47	17.49	10.49	9.91	4.77	8.04	2.46	1.59	2.44	2.29	5.04
Heves	34.61	20.84	9.68	7.45	8.76	5.63	4.71	1.35	1.73	1.44	3.81
Jász-Nagykun-Szolnok	34.97	19.39	9.57	10.27	5.12	7.41	4.74	1.63	2.02	-	4.88
Komárom-Esztergom	38.72	22.89	8.64	8.37	6.42	6.36	3.39	-	1.69	-	3.52
Nógrád	34.79	16.61	10.47	6.23	10.73	6.50	10.60	-	1.69	-	2.39
Pest	29.88	20.69	12.00	9.62	7.70	7.01	2.19	3.19	1.66	2.49	3.57
Somogy	40.60	15.42	9.03	12.37	6.49	7.42	1.86	1.25	2.24	1.52	1.79
Szabolcs-Szatmár-Bereg	32.64	16.25	12.00	8.79	7.84	7.61	3.54	1.58	1.93	1.72	6.09
Tolna	31.25	18.07	10.65	8.25	8.88	7.92	2.59	2.04	4.18	2.09	4.09
Vas	25.83	25.63	12.31	11.32	10.54	6.99	2.15	1.44	2.60	-	1.19
Veszprém	29.00	22.31	12.23	10.44	7.74	8.04	2.10	1.26	1.94	-	4.95
Zala	29.37	18.87	12.35	13.91	9.81	7.66	2.13	-	2.06	-	3.84
Total	32.99	19.73	11.73	8.82	7.03	7.01	3.18	2.53	2.10	1.58	3.25
