= József Antall =

Hungarian politician (1932–1993)

Dr. József Antall de Dörgicse et Kisjene
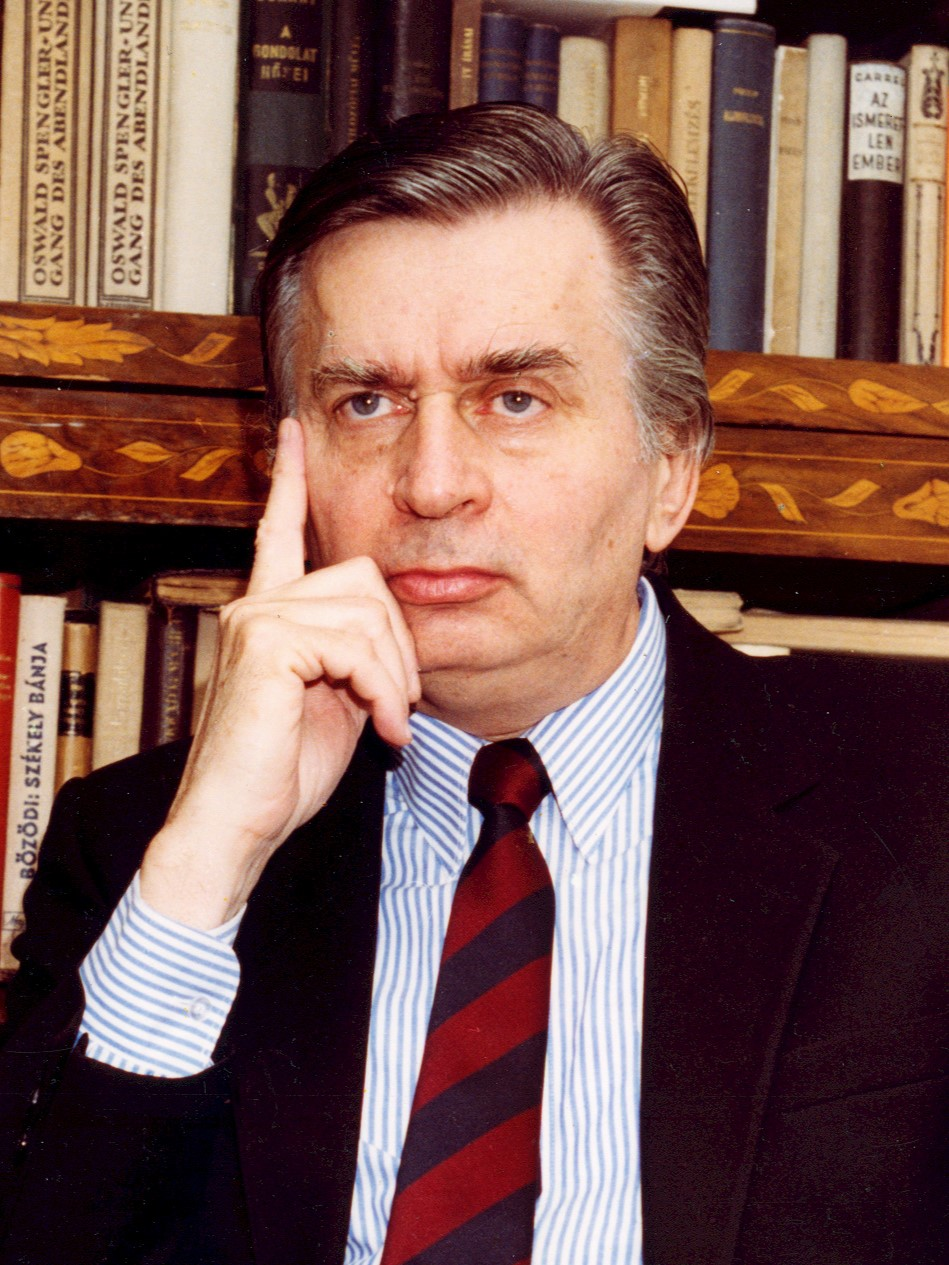
- Formal portrait by Péter Antall, 1990

Prime Minister of Hungary
- In office 23 May 1990 – 12 December 1993
- President: Árpád Göncz
- Preceded by: Miklós Németh
- Succeeded by: Péter Boross

Leader of the Hungarian Democratic Forum
- In office 21 October 1989 – 12 December 1993
- Preceded by: Zoltán Bíró
- Succeeded by: Lajos Für

Member of the National Assembly
- In office 2 May 1990 – 12 December 1993

Personal details
- Born: 8 April 1932 Budapest, Hungary
- Died: 12 December 1993 (aged 61) Budapest, Hungary
- Party: MDF
- Spouse: Klára Fülepp
- Children: 2
- Education: Eötvös Loránd University (MSc, PhD)

József Tihamér Antall, Jr. (Note: Hungarian: ifjabb Antall József Tihamér; Hungarian pronunciation: [ˈifjɒbː ˈɒntɒl ˈjoːʒef]) (8 April 1932 – 12 December 1993) was a Hungarian teacher, librarian, historian, and statesman who served as the first democratically elected prime minister of Hungary, holding office from May 1990 until his death in December 1993. He was also the leader of the Hungarian Democratic Forum from 1989.

== Early life and education ==
József Tihamér Antall de Dörgicse et Kisjene was born to an ancient Hungarian family from the lower nobility in Budapest on 8 April 1932. His father, József Antall Sr., a jurist and civil servant, worked for the government in several ministries. Antall Sr. coordinated the first living wage calculations in Hungary, and he was a founding member of the Independent Smallholders' Party (1931). During World War II, he presided over the government committee for refugees. After the German occupation of Hungary he resigned; later he was arrested by the Gestapo. After the war, he became minister of reconstruction in the government of Zoltán Tildy. Later, he became president of the Hungarian Red Cross, but after the Communist takeover and the establishment of the Hungarian People's Republic he resigned and retired to his family estate. In 1991, he was posthumously honoured by Yad Vashem.

His mother, Irén Szűcs had Jewish roots, she was the daughter of a village teacher. Her father, István Szűcs (born Hermann Frankl), also became a political figure during World War I and the interwar period. In the 1920s Szűcs became a deputy secretary of state. Antall had a sister, Edith Antall. His brother-in-law, Géza Jeszenszky later became Minister of Foreign Affairs in the Antall cabinet.

He graduated from the Budapest Piarist High School in 1950. He was interested in politics early on, but did not pursue his political career during the communist regime of the 1950s. After graduating from high school, he studied Hungarian language and literature at the Eötvös Loránd University as well as history and archival science. He wrote his thesis about the politics of József Eötvös, obtaining degrees in teaching, library science and museology. On 30 September 1991, Antall was awarded an honorary doctoral degree from Central Connecticut State University.

Antall and his wife, Klára Fülepp, had two children, György Antall, a lawyer, and Péter Antall, a photojournalist, who later became director of the Antall József Knowledge Centre.

== Early career ==
Following the graduation, Antall worked for the Hungarian State Archives and the Research Institute of Pedagogy. In 1955, he started teaching in József Eötvös Grammar School, leading the Revolutionary Committee of the school during the 1956 Hungarian Uprising. During the revolution, he participated in the reorganization of the Independent Smallholders Party and in the founding of the Christian Youth Alliance. After the Soviet Union crushed the revolution, he was arrested and released several times. He continued his teaching career in Ferenc Toldy Grammar School in 1957, but in 1959 he was banned from teaching due to his former political activities.

Following this, he worked as a librarian for two years. In 1963 he wrote biographies of 80 doctors for the Lexicon of Hungarian Biographies. He became interested in the history of medicine, and conducted fundamental research in the area. He started working in the library and archives department of the Semmelweis Museum of Medical History, dedicated to the history of medicine. Starting as a research fellow, he was promoted to deputy director and in 1974 he became director of the institute. His research was recognised internationally, and in 1986 he was the vice president of the International Society for the History of Medicine.

== Prime minister ==
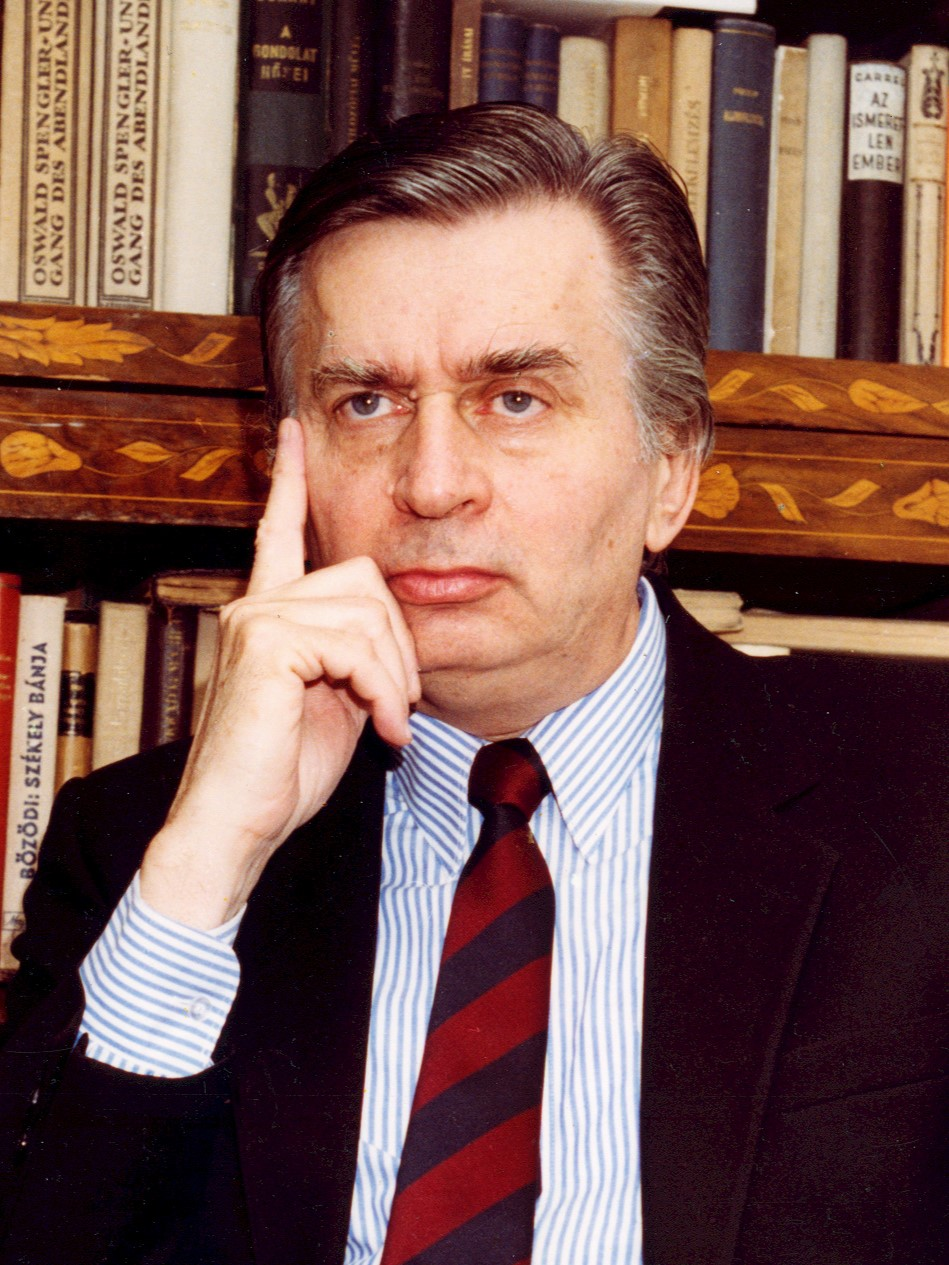
- Formal portrait by Péter Antall, 1990
- Premiership of József Antall; 23 May 1990 – 12 December 1993
- President: Árpád Göncz
- Cabinet: Antall Government
- Party: Hungarian Democratic Forum
- Election: 1990

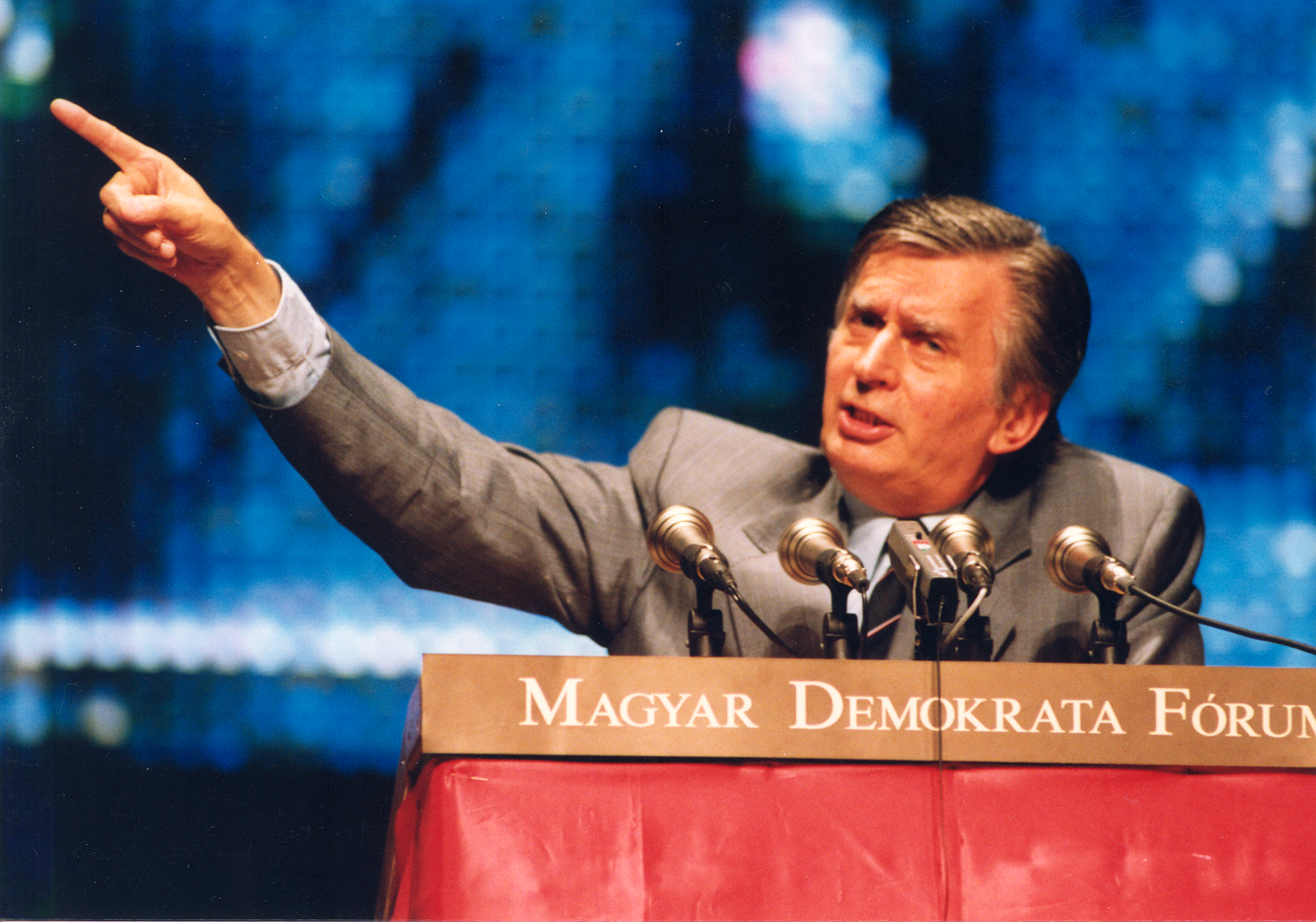
Antall became leader of the Hungarian Democratic Forum (MDF) in 1989

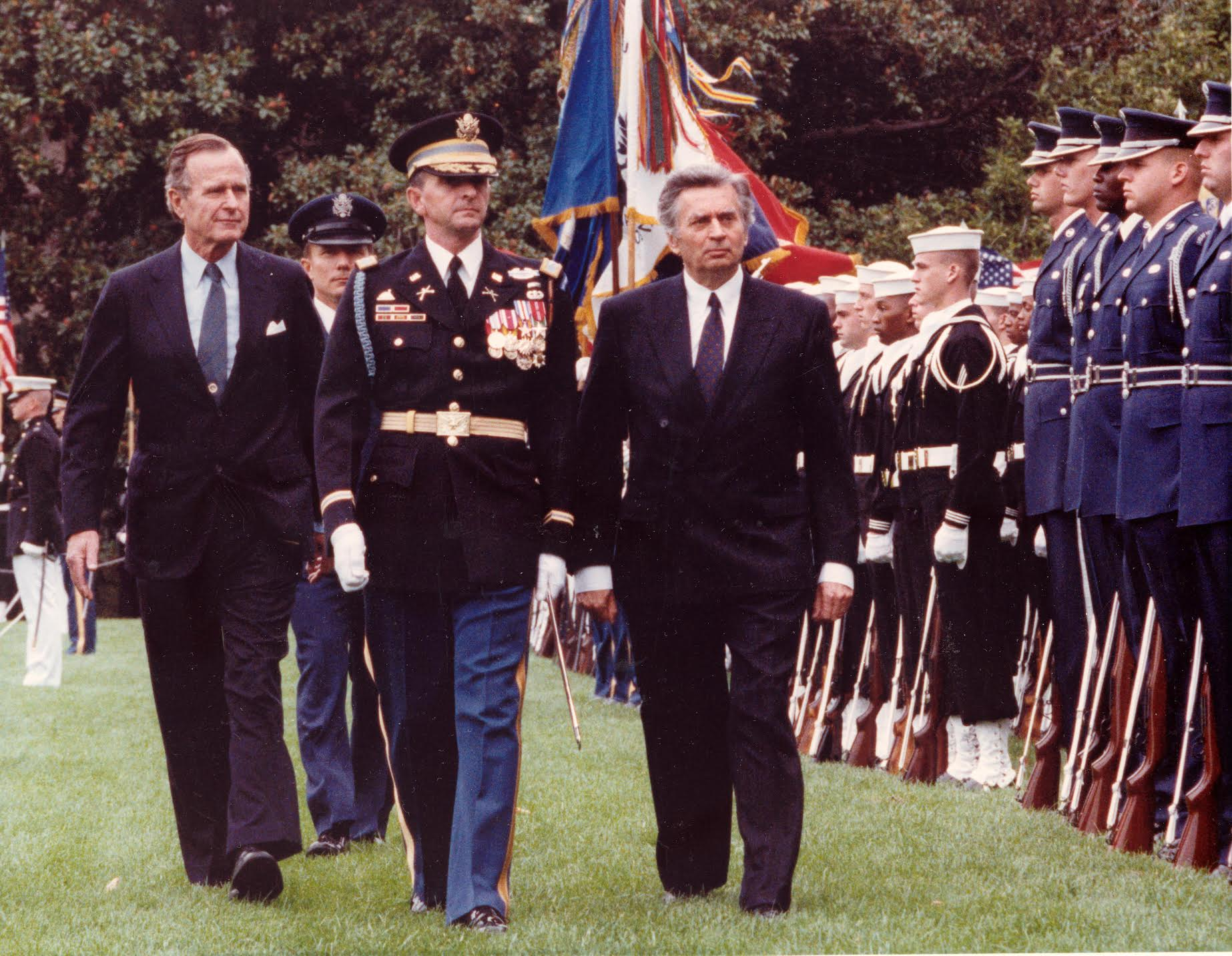
Antall with U.S. President George H. W. Bush in October 1990

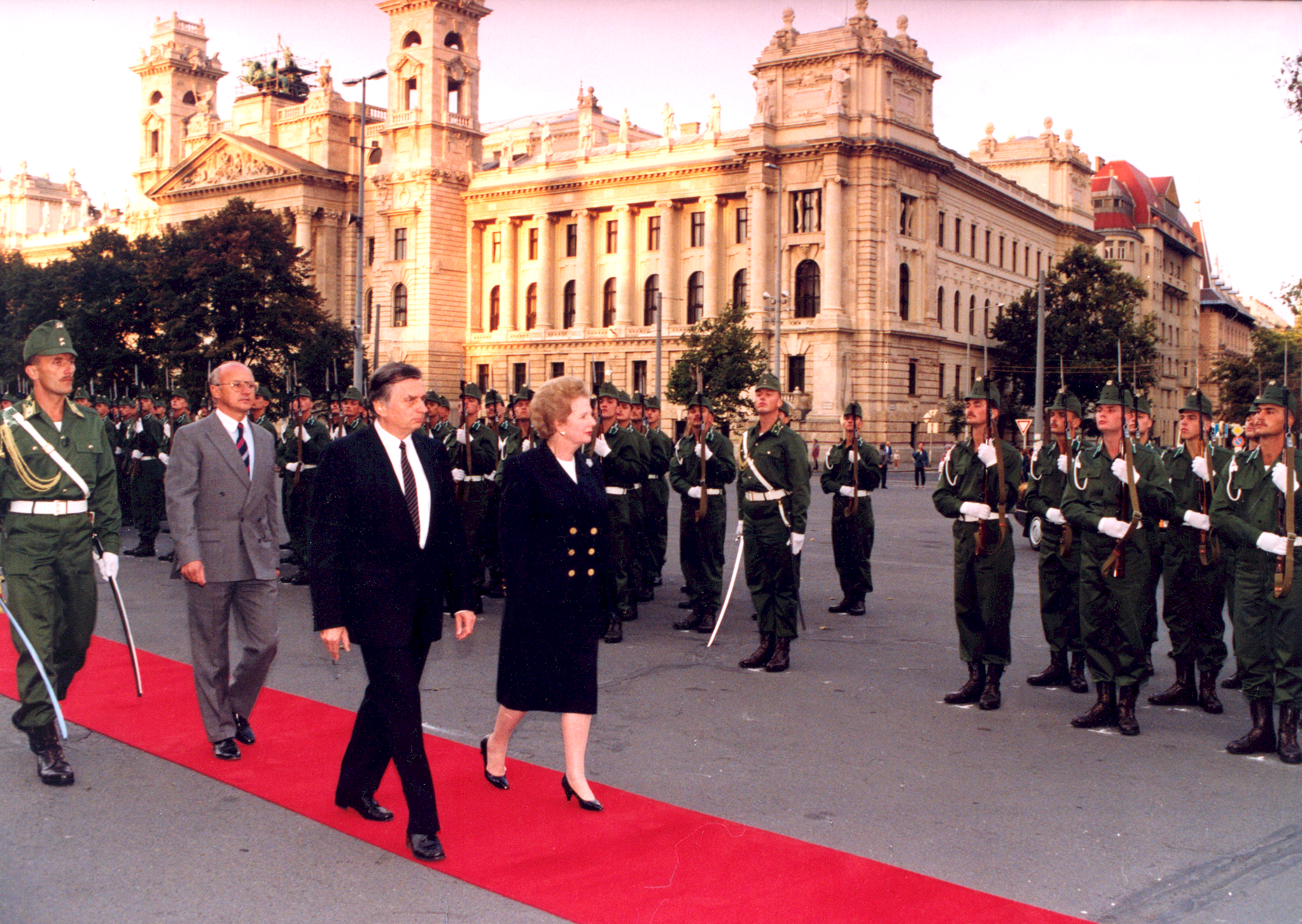
Antall with British Prime Minister Margaret Thatcher in Budapest in 1990

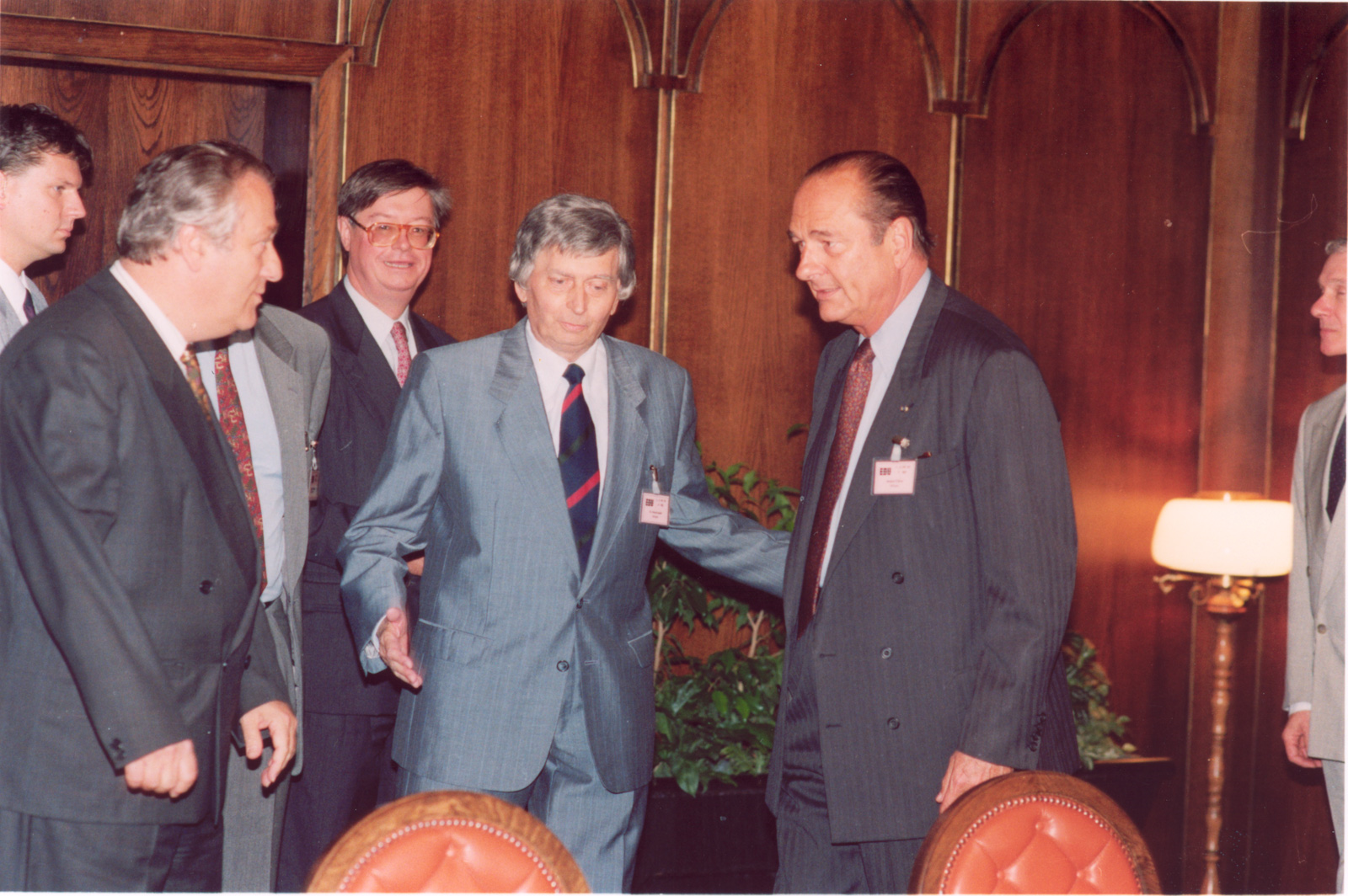
Antall with Jacques Chirac at the European Democrat Union conference in 1993

Antall was delegated to the National Roundtable Talks by the Hungarian Democratic Forum on 22 March 1989 and worked in the committee on constitutional reform. He became well known for his activities during the negotiations.

On 21 October 1989 he was elected President of the Hungarian Democratic Forum (MDF) by an overwhelming majority, thus becoming the party's official candidate for prime minister. The MDF was heavily tipped to win the 1990 elections, and as expected won a sweeping victory with 164 seats, just short of a majority. On 23 May he became the first prime minister since 1948 who was not either a Communist or fellow traveler. He headed a centre-right coalition comprising the MDF, the Independent Smallholders, Agrarian Workers and Civic Party (FKGP), and the Christian Democratic People's Party (KDNP)–the first in 44 years with no Communist participation. He also made a pact with the main opposition party, the liberal Alliance of Free Democrats (SZDSZ). This agreement laid the foundations for the parliamentary operation of Hungarian democracy. His statement that, in spirit, he wanted to be the Prime Minister of 15 million Hungarians made a great sensation. At the same time, he contributed to the Euro-Atlantic orientation of Hungary. He played a great role in the dissolution of the Warsaw Pact and the termination of the Comecon as well as in the withdrawal of the occupying Russian forces in 1991. In 1991, in Strasbourg, he was awarded with the Robert Schuman Prize for his activities aimed at uniting Europe as well as extending Hungary's European relations.

As prime minister, Antall oversaw the establishment of a legal system to promote a market economy and attract foreign investment. The ruling coalition attempted to stabilize the economy while implementing privatization and other elements of a market economy, while the populist right wing of the MDF was vocal about the "national issue", the question of the Hungarian minorities in neighbouring countries—and attempted to put it at the centre of the government's platform.

However, the return to a capitalist system and all its accompanying reforms resulted in socioeconomic difficulties for the country during Antall's term. Unemployment jumped from nonexistence to 14 percent. Inflation increased at an annual rate of 23–35 percent (excluding indexing of wages and pensions). Older, retired people, more than one-fifth of the population, suffered the most, and the living standards of more than one-third of the populace declined to below subsistence level. In the meantime, income disparities increased, which irritated the people. Corruption became more widespread and visible than before. Together with the previously omnipotent police force, street security also collapsed in 1990. The crime rate, especially in Budapest, increased threefold in five years.

In the summer of 1990, Antall and the MDF supported the introduction of a Catholic religious education into the national curriculum. This led to conflict with the other coalition parties, since only three-quarters of the Hungarian population were Catholics. Antall appointed Miklós Lukáts of the KDNP as his State Secretary for Church Affairs; from this position, Lukáts oversaw religious affairs, including the return of church properties seized by the communists. By 1991 Antall was receiving criticism for his authoritarian style, though this contrasted with his uncharismatic presence. Conflict over their powers erupted between him and Hungary's president, Árpád Göncz, who belonged to the opposing party, the Alliance of Free Democrats.

In the realm of domestic politics, Antall had to face hardships during his career: the taxi-blockade in Budapest in 1990 and the withdrawal of the Independent Smallholders' Party from the coalition government forced him to restructure his cabinet in February 1992; that reorganisation ultimately saved his administration from being toppled. Within MDF, Antall was continuously attacked by István Csurka who later on set into motion a stand-alone movement, thus Hungarian Justice and Life Party (MIÉP) came into existence.

== Illness and death ==
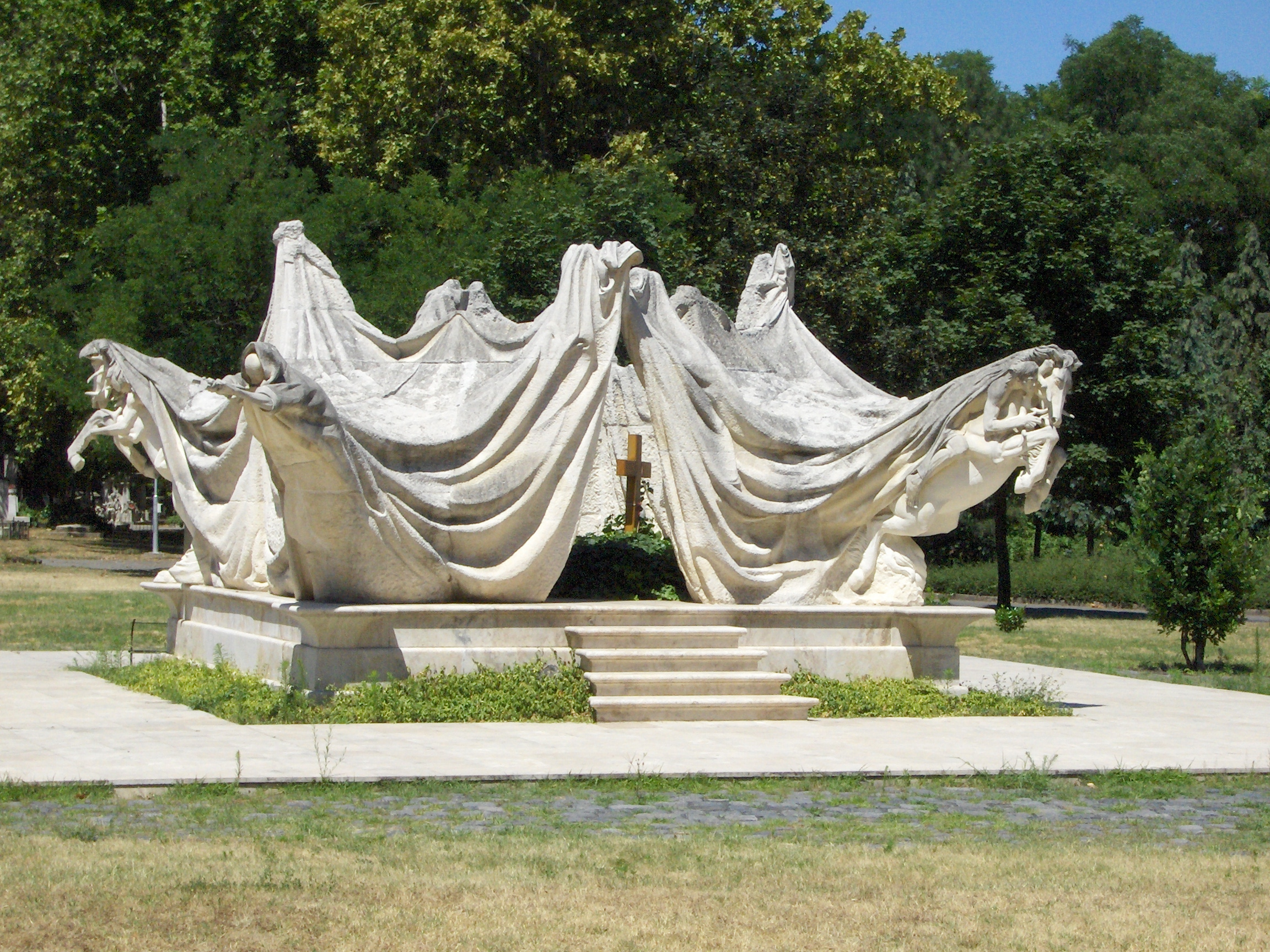
Tomb of József Antall

Antall became ill and was diagnosed with non-Hodgkin lymphoma in the summer of 1990. In October, two days before the start of the taxi drivers' blockade, he underwent surgery; a famous interview with him in pajamas was recorded thereafter in the hospital so that he could respond to the heated political situation caused by the taxi blockade. Antall's cancer recurred half a year later. On the day before his death, Antall was awarded Grand Cross of the Hungarian Order of Merit by President Árpád Göncz on 11 December 1993. During the last period of his premiership Antall was substituted by the Interior Minister Péter Boross.

Antall died on 12 December 1993 before the end of his 4-year term. He led the former Eastern Bloc's longest lasting and most stable post-communist government. He was succeeded by Boross as prime minister, who led the cabinet until the 1994 parliamentary election, where the MDF suffered a serious defeat from the Socialist Party, while Defence Minister Lajos Für replaced him as party leader. Antall was buried on 18 December 1993, with the day of the funeral being declared a day of national mourning. His bier was erected in front of the Hungarian Parliament Building, where it was bidden farewell by Speaker György Szabad, writer András Sütő and titular abbot Pál Bolberitz. The funeral procession finished at Kerepesi Cemetery. His tomb was later erected by sculptor Miklós Melocco in 1999.

=== Interruption of DuckTales ===
The announcement of Antall's death happened on a Sunday afternoon, during which the state television channel Magyar Televízió was airing a DuckTales episode called "A Whale of a Bad Time", as part of The Disney Afternoon; at 18:08, mid-cartoon the screen abruptly went black, after which the station logo was shown and Frédéric Chopin's Funeral March began playing. The abrupt shift in tone has created a flashbulb memory for the generation of children watching, who as adults were still able to recall specific details of the event, down to the exact dialog when the interruption in the episode occurred; some of the same adults have expressed their distaste in politics as a direct result of the interruption.

== Legacy ==
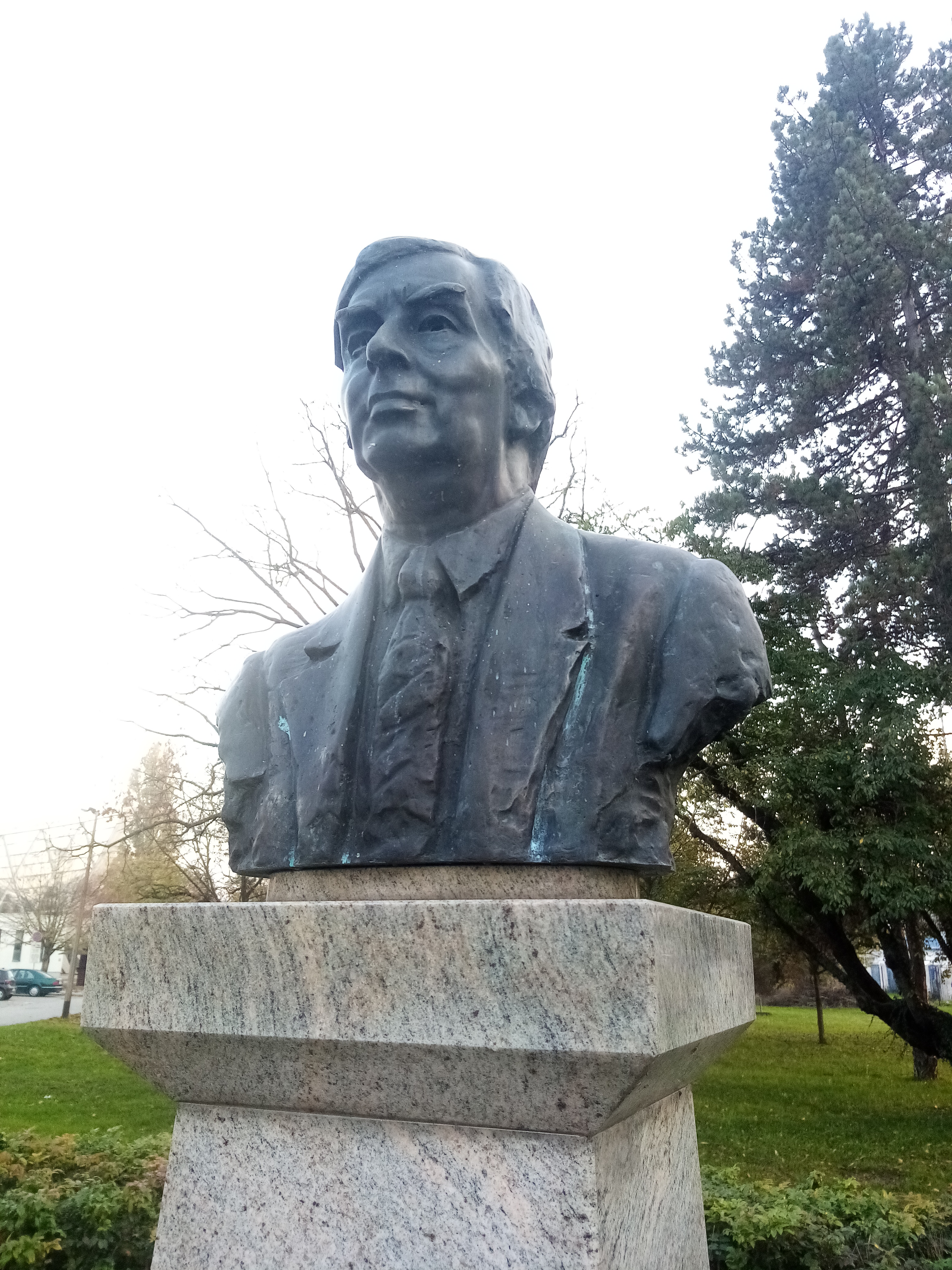
The bust of Antall on the eponymous road in Zagreb

In recognition of his work, one of the buildings of the European Parliament in Brussels was named after Antall in 2008. There is a bust of him on Apród Street in Budapest and a bust on the road named after him in Zagreb.

== Other information ==
- Hungary from Encyclopædia Britannica 2006 Ultimate Reference Suite DVD
- Monography: A Miniszterelnök (author: Debreczeni József)

Political offices
| Preceded by Miklós Németh | Prime Minister of Hungary; 1990–1993 | Succeeded by Péter Boross |
Party political offices
| Preceded by Zoltán Bíró | President of the Hungarian Democratic Forum; 1989–1993 | Succeeded by Lajos Für |
