= List of members of the National Assembly of Hungary (1990–1994) =

National Assembly of Hungary (1990–1994)

Type
- Type: unicameral
- Houses: National Assembly

History
- Founded: 2 May 1990
- Disbanded: 27 June 1994 (4 years, 56 days)
- Succeeded by: Members 1994–1998

Leadership
- Speaker of the National Assembly: Árpád Göncz, SZDSZ 2 May – 3 August 1990 György Szabad, MDF since 3 August 1990

Structure
- Seats: 386
- Political groups: Government (230): MDF (165); FKGP (44); KDNP (21); Opposition (156): SZDSZ (94); MSZP (33); Fidesz (22); ASZ (1); Ind. (6); Government (194): MDF (135); EKGP (36); KDNP (23); Opposition (191): SZDSZ (83); MSZP (33); Fidesz (26); MIÉP (12); FKGP (9); ASZ (2); Ind. (26)

Elections
- Last election: 25 March and 8 April 1990
- Next election: 8 and 29 May 1994

Meeting place
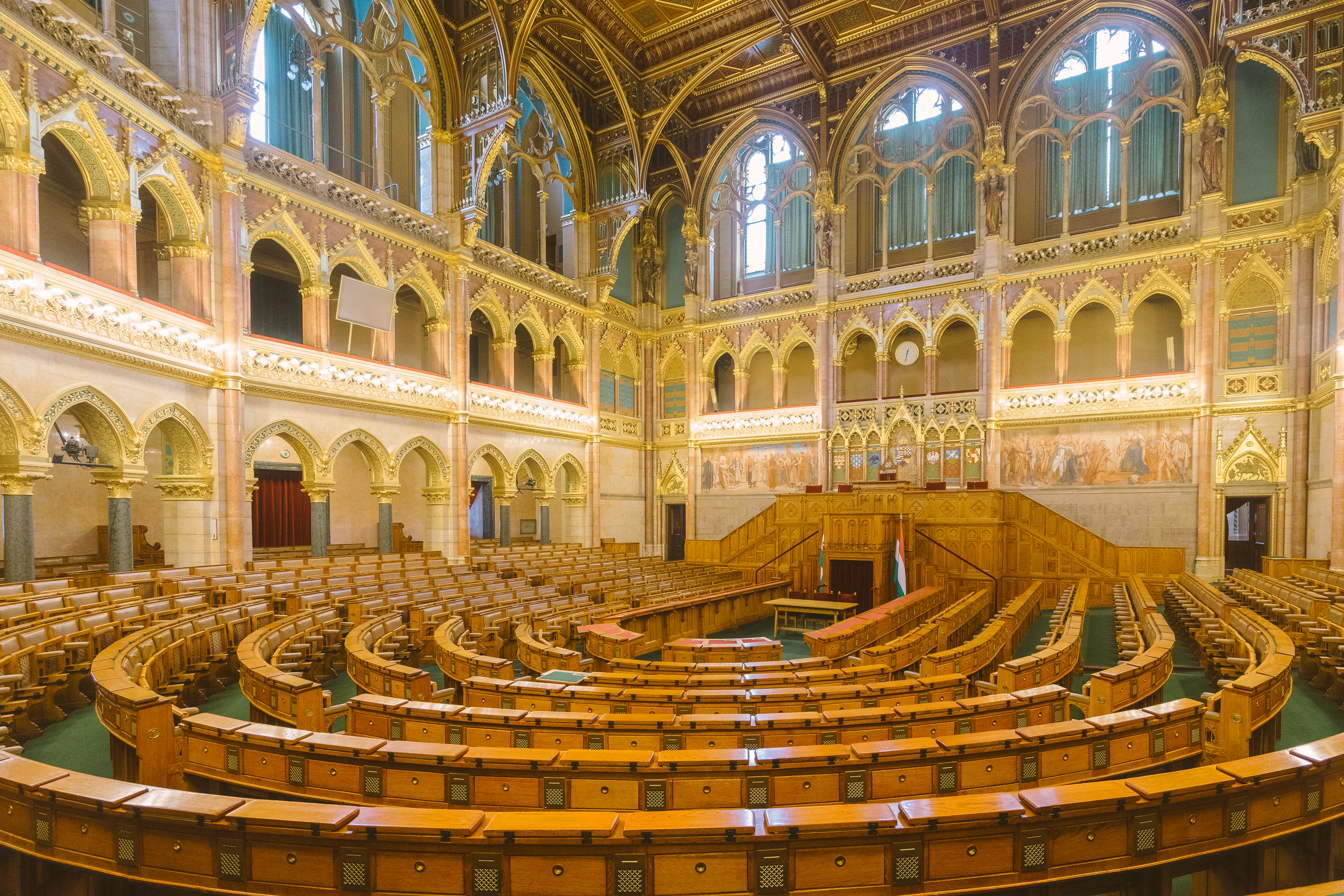
- Hungarian Parliament Building; Lajos Kossuth Square 1 Budapest, H-1055; Hungary

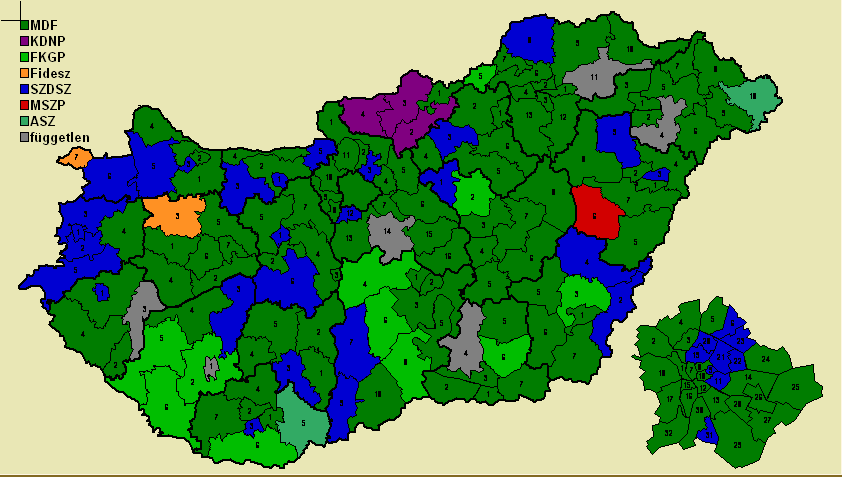
The winners of the individual seats in 1990

The list of members of the National Assembly of Hungary (1990–1994) is the list of members of the National Assembly - the unicameral legislative body of Hungary - according to the outcome of the Hungarian parliamentary election of 1990. The members of the new National Assembly were installed on May 2, 1990. There has been a sizable number of mutations since due to the particular nature of the Hungary constitutional system. New members are supplied from their party lists so the resignation of individual members' seats does not change the balance of power in the National Assembly.

== Officials ==
=== Speaker of the National Assembly ===
- Árpád Göncz (May 2, 1990 – August 2, 1990)
- György Szabad (August 3, 1990 – June 27, 1994)

=== Deputy Speakers of the National Assembly ===
- Alajos Dornbach (SZDSZ) (August 3, 1990 – June 27, 1994)
- György Szabad (MDF) (May 2, 1990 – August 3, 1990)
- Mátyás Szűrös (MSZP)
- Vince Vörös (FKGP; EKGP)

=== Recorders ===
- István Balás (MDF) (May 2, 1990 – June 11, 1990)
- Gábor Balogh (KDNP) (May 2, 1990 – March 17, 1993)
- Balázs Bárdos (FKGP) (May 2, 1990 – January 15, 1991)
- László Boros (MSZP) (February 11, 1991 – 27 June 1994)
- Katalin Bossányi (MSZP) (May 2, 1990 – January 31, 1991)
- Béla Glattfelder (Fidesz)
- József Horváth (MDF) (June 11, 1990 – 27 June 1994)
- Péter Juhász (KDNP) (March 24, 1992 – 27 June 1994)
- Mária Kóródi (SZDSZ)
- Gyula Pásztor (FKGP) (February 11, 1991 – May 7, 1991)
- Lajos Szabó (FKGP) (May 14, 1991 – June 27, 1994)
- Sándor Tóth (KDNP)
- Zoltán Trombitás (Fidesz)

=== Father of the House ===
- Kálmán Kéri (MDF) (May 2, 1990 – May 26, 1994)
- Vince Vörös (EKGP) (May 26, 1994 – June 27, 1994)

=== Baby of the House ===
- Béla Glattfelder (Fidesz) (May 2, 1990 – December 22, 1993)
- Róbert Répássy (Fidesz) (December 22, 1993 – June 27, 1994)

==== Senior Recorders ====
- Tamás Deutsch (Fidesz)
- Zsuzsanna Szelényi (Fidesz)
- Tamás Wachsler (Fidesz)

== Leaders of the parliamentary groups ==
- MDF:
  - Imre Kónya (May 2, 1990 – December 20, 1993)
  - Ferenc Kulin (December 21, 1993 – June 27, 1994)
- SZDSZ:
  - Péter Tölgyessy (May 2, 1990 – October 15, 1990)
  - Iván Pető (October 16, 1990 – December 2, 1991)
  - Márton Tardos (December 3, 1991 – May 31, 1993)
  - Gábor Kuncze (June 1, 1993 – June 27, 1994)
- MSZP:
  - Imre Pozsgay (May 2, 1990 – October 31, 1990)
  - Zoltán Gál (November 1, 1990 – June 27, 1994)
- KDNP:
  - Tibor Füzessy (May 2, 1990 – June 17, 1992)
  - Béla Csépe (June 18, 1992 – June 27, 1994)
- Fidesz:
  - Viktor Orbán
- FKGP:
- EKGP:
  - István Böröcz (September 27, 1992 – June 27, 1994)
- MIÉP:
  - Lajos Horváth (July 5, 1993 – June 27, 1994)

== Government ==
No.	Portrait	Name (Birth–Death)	Term of office		Political party	Cabinet
53		József Antall (1932–1993)	23 May 1990	12 December 1993 (died in office)	MDF	Antall; MDF–FKGP–KDNP
—		Péter Boross (born 1928) acting	12 December 1993	21 December 1993	MDF	Antall; MDF–FKGP–KDNP
54		Péter Boross (born 1928)	21 December 1993	15 July 1994	MDF	Boross; MDF–EKGP–KDNP

== Composition ==
Affiliation	Members			
Affiliation	2 May 1990	Status	27 June 1994	Status
MDF	165	Government	135	Government
SZDSZ	94	Opposition	83	Opposition
FKGP	44	Government	9	Opposition
MSZP	33	Opposition	33	Opposition
Fidesz	22	Opposition	26	Opposition
KDNP	21	Government	23	Government
ASZ	1	Opposition	2	Opposition
EKGP	–	–	36	Government
MIÉP	–	–	12	Opposition
Independent	6	–	26	–
Total number of seats	386	230	385	194

Note: ASZ and, after 1992, FKGP politicians were also technically independent MPs

== Members of the National Assembly ==
=== Parties of the Coalition Government ===
==== MDF ====
- Bertalan Andrásfalvy (Baranya County I)
- József Antall (Budapest Regional List)
- András Baka (Budapest Regional List)
- Lajos Bakó (Győr-Moson-Sopron County II)
- Tibor Balázsi (Borsod-Abaúj-Zemplén County I)
- Gábor Tamás Balla (Budapest XXV)
- János Balogh (Győr-Moson-Sopron County V)
- István Balsai (National List)
- György Bánffy (Budapest I)
- Miklós Baranyai (Heves County III)
- Pál Becker (Pest County V)
- István Bethlen (Budapest Regional List)
- Endre Bilecz (Nógrád County Regional List)
- Ferenc Bíró (Baranya County Regional List)
- Péter Ákos Bod (Veszprém County Regional List)
- László Bogár (Borsod-Abaúj-Zemplén County Regional List)
- Zoltán Bogárdi (Pest County I)
- Katalin Botos (Budapest Regional List)
- József Bratinka (Csongrád County III)
- Miklós Csapody (Budapest XV)
- Dénes Csengey (Zala County Regional List)
- István Csizmadia (Veszprém County IV)
- György Csóti (National List)
- Ibolya Dávid (Tolna County V)
- Krisztina Dobos (Budapest Regional List)
- László Dobos (Budapest XIV)
- Gábor Farkas (Pest County VI)
- Attila Fejes (Hajdú-Bihar County I)
- György Fekete (Budapest Regional List)
- Gyula Fekete (Budapest V)
- Pál Fekete (Bács-Kiskun County V)
- János Figler (Tolna County II)
- András Attila Fodor (Budapest XXVIII)
- Lajos Für (Vas County Regional List)
- Antal Gaál (Somogy County IV)
- Ferenc Gömbös (Vas County IV)
- Ferenc Grezsa (Csongrád County Regional List)
- Dezső Gyarmati (National List)
- János Gyurkó (Budapest XXX)
- József Hoppa (Baranya County IV)
- Balázs Horváth (Veszprém County VI)
- Béla Horváth (Budapest XVIII)
- József Horváth (Komárom-Esztergom County Regional List)
- Miklós Horváth (Fejér County II)
- Richárd Hörcsik (Borsod-Abaúj-Zemplén County Regional List)
- István Illésy (Fejér County III)
- Ferenc Jakab (Szabolcs-Szatmár-Bereg County V)
- Károly Jávor (Pest County V)
- Fábián Józsa (Bács-Kiskun County I)
- Attila Kálmán (Komárom-Esztergom County II)
- Gábor Kánya (Bács-Kiskun County III)
- József Kapronczay (Baranya County VII)
- Péter Karsai (Bács-Kiskun County X)
- Zoltán Kátay (Budapest XVII)
- Tamás Katona (Pest County II)
- András Kelemen (Fejér County Regional List)
- Sándor K. Keresztes (Győr-Moson-Sopron County Regional List)
- Kálmán Kéri (National List)
- Gyula Kincses (Hajdú-Bihar County Regional List)
- Gyula József Kis (Budapest Regional List)
- György Kiss (Borsod-Abaúj-Zemplén County IV)
- Sándor Komor (Hajdú-Bihar County IV)
- Imre Kónya (Pest County Regional List)
- Katalin Kónya-Kutrucz (National List)
- Péter Kószó (Csongrád County Regional List)
- László Kovács (Pest County VIII)
- Huba Kozma (Bács-Kiskun County Regional List)
- Ferenc Kulin (Pest County Regional List)
- Sándor Kulin (Pest County XVI)
- István Markó (Békés County Regional List)
- Gyula Marx (Zala County Regional List)
- László Medgyasszay (Győr-Moson-Sopron County I)
- László Mészáros (Veszprém County Regional List)
- Péter Mészáros (Budapest XXXII)
- Károly Mezey (Szabolcs-Szatmár-Bereg County VII)
- Zoltán Mihály (Csongrád County VII)
- Lajos Mile (Borsod-Abaúj-Zemplén County III)
- István Molnár (Jász-Nagykun-Szolnok County V)
- István Nagy (Szabolcs-Szatmár-Bereg County Regional List)
- József Nagy-Bozsoky (Borsod-Abaúj-Zemplén County X)
- Tibor Nyerges (Tolna County Regional List)
- Imre Palkovics (Veszprém County Regional List)
- József Pál (Nógrád County Regional List)
- Gyula Pánczél (Bács-Kiskun County Regional List)
- András Pap (Baranya County II)
- Lehel György Papp (Csongrád County V)
- Sándor Papp (Veszprém County VII)
- Gábor Perjés (Budapest XVI)
- Ferenc Pesti (Borsod-Abaúj-Zemplén County XIII)
- László Petronyák (Jász-Nagykun-Szolnok County IV)
- Jenő Póda (Csongrád County Regional List)
- Endre Pokorny (Heves County Regional List)
- József Pongrácz (Heves County V)
- Erzsébet Pusztai (Veszprém County I)
- Ernő Raffay (Csongrád County I)
- Katalin Remport (Békés County VII)
- Gábor Roszík (Pest County IV)
- Róbert Rudics (Zala County IV)
- László Salamon (National List)
- György Sándorfy (Budapest Regional List)
- József Sápi (Hajdú-Bihar County V)
- László Sárossy (Budapest IV)
- György Schamschula (Budapest VII)
- Ferenc Schmidt (Veszprém County V)
- Csaba Siklós (Budapest III)
- Tamás Somogyi (Budapest X)
- László Sóvágó (Hajdú-Bihar County VII)
- Zoltán Speidl (Nógrád County I)
- György Szabad (Budapest Regional List)
- Iván Szabó (Budapest XII)
- János Szabó (Jász-Nagykun-Szolnok County VIII)
- Lajos Szabó (Jász-Nagykun-Szolnok County VII)
- Tamás Szabó (Veszprém County II)
- Béla Szarvas (Heves County I)
- Rudolf Szauter (Pest County X)
- Zoltán Szeleczky (Budapest XVII)
- László Szendrei (Szabolcs-Szatmár-Bereg County VI)
- János Szentágothai (National List)

== See also ==
- List of Hungarian people
