= István Levente Garai =

Hungarian physician and politician (1955–2018)

Member of the National Assembly
- In office 27 August 2004 – 5 May 2014
- In office 28 June 1994 – 17 June 1998

Personal details
- Born: 15 June 1955 Berettyóújfalu, Hungary
- Died: 25 December 2018 (aged 63)
- Party: MSZMP (1988–89); MSZP (since 1989); Fédisz (1989–?)
- Profession: physician, politician

István Levente Garai (15 June 1955 – 25 December 2018) was a Hungarian physician and politician, member of the National Assembly (MP) for Kiskunfélegyháza (Bács-Kiskun County Constituency V) from 1994 to 1998 and from 2006 to 2010. He was also a Member of Parliament from the Bács-Kiskun County regional list of the Hungarian Socialist Party (MSZP) from 2004 to 2006 and from 2010 to 2014.

== Biography ==
Garai was born in Berettyóújfalu on 15 June 1955, as the son of teacher István Garai Sr. and health visitor Erzsébet Szabó. He finished his elementary studies in Szank and secondary studies in Kiskunfélegyháza, where graduated at the Móra Ferenc Secondary School in 1973. He earned his degree of general practitioner at the Medical University of Szeged (today a faculty of the University of Szeged, SZTE) in 1979. He started his professional career in the local hospital of Kiskunfélegyháza. He made a special examination of internal medicine in 1985.

He was elected to the local council of Kiskunfélegyháza in 1985, serving in this capacity until 1990. He chaired its health and social committee. He joined the Hungarian Socialist Workers' Party (MSZMP) in 1988. After Mihály Korom resigned from his parliamentary seat (Bács-Kiskun County Constituency VIII) under social pressure on 30 May 1989, Garai was nominated the ruling communist party's candidate for the position. He won the two by-elections held throughout in 1989, but turnout was too low to make the ballots valid in both cases. Garai was a founder of the local organization Democratic Youth Federation of Kiskunfélegyháza (Fédisz), which initially was established as an autonomous regional branch of the Hungarian Democratic Youth League (DEMISZ) in Kiskunfélegyháza, the short-lived successor organization of the Hungarian Young Communist League (KISZ). Its first congress elected Garai as leader of the organization. Meanwhile, he also joined the newly established Hungarian Socialist Party (MSZP) in October 1989, the legal successor of the MSZMP. The Fédisz transformed itself as a party to the 1990 parliamentary election. They made an electoral coalition with the local Regional Democratic Youth Alliance (Tedisz) from Kiskunmajsa, the two parties had only one individual candidate, István Levente Garai, who ran in the Kiskunfélegyháza constituency and came to the fourth place. During the 1990 municipal election, he was elected to the local representative body of Kiskunfélegyháza as the list leader of Fédisz, where he chaired the health, social and family protection committee, and was also a member of the culture, education and youth committee.

Garai participated in the 1994 parliamentary election as a candidate of the Socialist Party and secured an individual mandate, representing his hometown Kiskunfélegyháza. He sat in the Social and Health Committee until the 1998 parliamentary election, when he lost his parliamentary seat against Fidesz candidate Sándor Endre. Garai was again defeated by Endre in the 2002 parliamentary election, while MSZP became the governing force. However, Garai secured a mandate two years later from his party's Bács-Kiskun County regional list on 27 August 2004, when replaced Csaba Tabajdi, who was elected to the European Parliament. He worked for the Social and Family Committee until 2006 and the Committee on Foreign Affairs for a brief time. He was a member of the Health Committee from 2004 to 2014. Meanwhile, Garai served as deputy mayor of Kiskunfélegyháza between 2002 and 2010, and was considered a strong local ally of mayor József Ficsór (SZDSZ). During the 2006 parliamentary election, Garai defeated Endre after two unsuccessful attempts and became MP for Kiskunfélegyháza again after eight years. In the 2010 parliamentary election, he lost to Krisztián Kapus (Fidesz). He became a Member of Parliament through the Socialists' Bács-Kiskun County regional list. Garai was nominated to the MSZP's candidate for the mayoral position of Kiskunfélegyháza in the 2010 local elections, after Ficsór retired from politics, but he was again defeated by Kapus. Garai functioned as MP until the 2014 parliamentary election, when he ran as a joint candidate of the Unity parties in Kiskunfélegyháza (Bács-Kiskun County Constituency IV), but came only to the third place after Sándor Lezsák (Fidesz) and László Kollár (Jobbik).

== Sources ==
- Vida, István (2011). "Félegyházi Demokratikus Ifjúsági Szövetség (Fédisz)". Magyarországi politikai pártok lexikona (1846–2010) [Encyclopedia of the Political Parties in Hungary (1846–2010)] (in Hungarian). Gondolat Kiadó. p. 346. ISBN 978-963-693-276-3.
