= Democratic Youth Federation of Kiskunfélegyháza =

Democratic Youth Federation of Kiskunfélegyháza Félegyházi Demokratikus Ifjúsági Szövetség
- President: István Levente Garai
- Founded: 3 June 1989
- Dissolved: 8 April 1990
- Ideology: Democratic socialism Localism
- Political position: Left-wing

The Democratic Youth Federation of Kiskunfélegyháza (Hungarian: Félegyházi Demokratikus Ifjúsági Szövetség; Fédisz), was a local political party based in Kiskunfélegyháza, Hungary.

== History ==
The Fédisz initially founded as an autonomous regional branch of the Hungarian Democratic Youth League (DEMISZ) in Kiskunfélegyháza, the short-lived successor organization of the Hungarian Young Communist League (KISZ). Its first congress elected physician István Garai as leader of the organization. The Fédisz's programme represented the idea of democratic socialism while rejected the rapid political and economical transformation from Communist party state to political pluralism.

Soon the Fédisz transformed itself as a party to the 1990 parliamentary election. They made an electoral coalition with the local Regional Democratic Youth Alliance (Tedisz) from Kiskunmajsa, the two parties had only one individual candidate, István Levente Garai, who received only 0.08 percent of the votes. The two parties broke up shortly thereafter.

== Election results ==
=== National Assembly ===
| Election year | National Assembly | | | | Government |
| Election year | # of overall votes | % of overall vote | # of overall seats won | +/– | Government |
|---|---|---|---|---|---|
| 1990 | 3,759 | 0.08% | 0 / 386 | | extra-parliamentary |

== Sources ==
- Vida, István (2011). "Félegyházi Demokratikus Ifjúsági Szövetség (Fédisz)". Magyarországi politikai pártok lexikona (1846–2010) [Encyclopedia of the Political Parties in Hungary (1846–2010)] (in Hungarian). Gondolat Kiadó. p. 346. ISBN 978-963-693-276-3.
