= Géza Gyimóthy =

Hungarian politician (born 1952)

Deputy Speaker of the National Assembly of Hungary
- In office 18 June 1998 – 19 September 2001

Personal details
- Born: 12 March 1952 (age 74) Tata, Hungary
- Party: MDF, FKGP
- Profession: politician, agrarian

Géza Gyimóthy (born 12 March 1952) is a former Hungarian politician, who served as one of the Deputy Speakers of the National Assembly of Hungary from 18 June 1998 to 19 September 2001.

== Political career ==
Gyimóthy joined Hungarian Democratic Forum (MDF) in 1988 and formed the party's basic organization in Tata. However he quit the party one year later. After that, he became a member of the Independent Smallholders, Agrarian Workers and Civic Party (FKGP) on 12 January 1990. He served as chairman of the party in his birthplace between 1990 and 1991. He was a strong supporter of József Torgyán.

He unsuccessfully ran for the parliamentary seat for Komárom-Esztergom County 5th Constituency in the elections in 1990. He became Deputy Chairman of the Independent Smallholders Party in July 1994. He was elected to a member of the National Assembly during the 1994 elections from the party's National List. He was appointed Deputy Chairman of the Committee on Agriculture.

After the 1998 elections, Gyimóthy became a deputy speaker of the parliament. He frequently used yellow and red cards to rebuke MPs. In 2000, former Prime Minister Gyula Horn referred to FKGP leader Torgyán as "Pubi", which is why Gyimóthy called him to order. Horn answered: "This is offensive? Do not be silly, Géza!" This moment became a political anecdote in Hungary.

In 2001-2002 the FKGP split into two parts and Gyimóthy's relation with the Party Chairman decayed. He was a candidate for the position of Minister of Agriculture, when Torgyán resigned; however, he was expelled from the party by Torgyán. As a result, Gyimóthy also lost his role as the legislative deputy speaker. After the failure of the 2002 Hungarian parliamentary election for the FKGP, he retired from politics.
