= Hungarian Cooperative and Agrarian Party =

Hungarian Cooperative and Agrarian Party Magyarországi Szövetkezeti és Agrárpárt
- President: János Nyilas
- Founded: 24 November 1989
- Dissolved: 19 December 1992
- Merged into: Agrarian Alliance (ASZ)
- Ideology: Agrarianism
- Political position: Left-wing

The Hungarian Cooperative and Agrarian Party (Hungarian: Magyarországi Szövetkezeti és Agrárpárt; MSZAP), was a short-lived agrarianist political party in Hungary.

The party contested the 1990 parliamentary election, it had individual candidates and a regional list only in Heves County, receiving 0.1 percent of the votes and won no seats. The party nominated Minister of Justice Kálmán Kulcsár as their candidate for the position of President of Hungary. After that the MSZAP did not participate in any further elections, it merged into the Agrarian Alliance (ASZ) on 19 December 1992.

== Election results ==
=== National Assembly ===
| Election year | National Assembly | | | | Government |
| Election year | # of overall votes | % of overall vote | # of overall seats won | +/– | Government |
|---|---|---|---|---|---|
| 1990 | 4,945 | 0.1% | 0 / 386 | | extra-parliamentary |

== Sources ==
- Vida, István (2011). "Magyarországi Szövetkezeti és Agrárpárt (MSZAP)". Magyarországi politikai pártok lexikona (1846–2010) [Encyclopedia of the Political Parties in Hungary (1846–2010)] (in Hungarian). Gondolat Kiadó. p. 430. ISBN 978-963-693-276-3.
