= Ferenc Wekler =

Hungarian politician (born 1955)

Deputy Speaker of the National Assembly of Hungary
- In office 18 June 1998 – 15 September 2004

Personal details
- Born: 23 October 1955 (age 70) Mecseknádasd, Hungary
- Party: SZFV, SZDSZ
- Profession: politician, jurist

Ferenc Wekler (born October 23, 1955) is a Hungarian politician, who served as one of the Deputy Speakers of the National Assembly of Hungary from June 18, 1998 to September 15, 2004. He resigned due to a political scandal. He was replaced by Gábor Világosi.

Wekler was a member of the National Assembly of Hungary between 1990 and 2006. He was a member of the Alliance of Free Democrats since 1990.
