= Somogy County Christian Coalition =

Somogy County Christian Coalition Somogyi Keresztény Koalíció
- Leader: Collective leadership
- Founded: January 1990
- Dissolved: April 1990
- Ideology: Christian conservativism Regionalism
- Political position: Right-wing

The Somogy County Christian Coalition (Hungarian: Somogyi Keresztény Koalíció; SKK) was a short-lived regional electoral coalition in Hungary, formed by minor right-wing conservative parties and organizations in early 1990 to jointly contest the 1990 parliamentary election in Somogy County.

== History ==
Founded in Kaposvár, the SKK consisted of the Alliance of Christian Democrats (KDSZ), the Holy Crown Society (SZKT), the National Alliance of Hungarian Political Prisoners (Pofosz), and later also joined by the National Smallholders' and Civic Party (NKPP).The lead figure of the alliance was archaeologist and historian Kálmán Magyar, and each member parties represented themselves in the SKK's leadership. The alliance's programme emphasized the national values and traditions, Hungary's Western-orientation, the christian democracy and a possible confederate-like integration of the former Eastern Bloc.

The SKK contested the 1990 election with four individual candidates in Somogy County and was also able to set up a regional county list. They received 0.12 percent of the votes and no seats. Shortly thereafter the coalition broke up.

== Election results ==
=== National Assembly ===
Election year	National Assembly				Government
Election year	# of overall votes	% of overall vote	# of overall seats won	+/–	Government
1990	5,966	0,12%	0 / 386		extra-parliamentary

== See also ==
- Association for Somogy

== Sources ==
- Vida, István (2011). "Somogyi Keresztény Koalíció (SKK)". Magyarországi politikai pártok lexikona (1846–2010) [Encyclopedia of the Political Parties in Hungary (1846–2010)] (in Hungarian). Gondolat Kiadó. pp. 447–448. ISBN 978-963-693-276-3.
