= László Pál =

Hungarian politician (1942–2017)

László Pál MP

Minister of Industry and Trade
- In office 15 July 1994 – 15 July 1995
- Prime Minister: Gyula Horn
- Preceded by: János Latorcai
- Succeeded by: Imre Dunai

Member of the National Assembly
- In office 2 May 1990 – 1 May 1997

Personal details
- Born: 5 September 1942 Budapest, Hungary
- Died: 21 November 2017 (aged 75)
- Party: MSZMP; MSZP
- Profession: politician, electrical engineer

László Pál (5 September 1942 – 21 November 2017) was a Hungarian politician and electrical engineer, who served as Minister of Industry and Trade in the cabinet of Prime Minister Gyula Horn from 1994 to 1995. He was also a Member of Parliament for the Hungarian Socialist Party (MSZP) from 1990 until his resignation in 1997. He was appointed CEO of the Hungarian Electrical Works Ltd. (MVM) in 2002.

Pál died on 21 November 2017 after a long illness, aged 75.

Political offices
Preceded by János Latorcai	Minister of Industry and Trade; 1994–1995	Succeeded by Imre Dunai
