= Gombos =

Gombos may refer to:

== People ==
- Ferenc Gömbös (1944-2003) Hungarian dentist and politician
- Gyula Gömbös (1886-1936) Hungarian military officer, politician and Prime Minister
- Károly Gombos (1981) Hungarian cross-country skier and biathlete
- Norbert Gomboš (1990) Slovak tennis player of Hungarian descent
- Sándor Gombos (1895-1968) Hungarian Olympic champion fencer
- Stjepan Gomboš (1895–1975) Croatian Jewish architect
- Zsolt Gombos (1968) Hungarian wrestler who competed in the 1992 Summer Olympics
