= László Mandur =

Hungarian photographer (1958–2020)

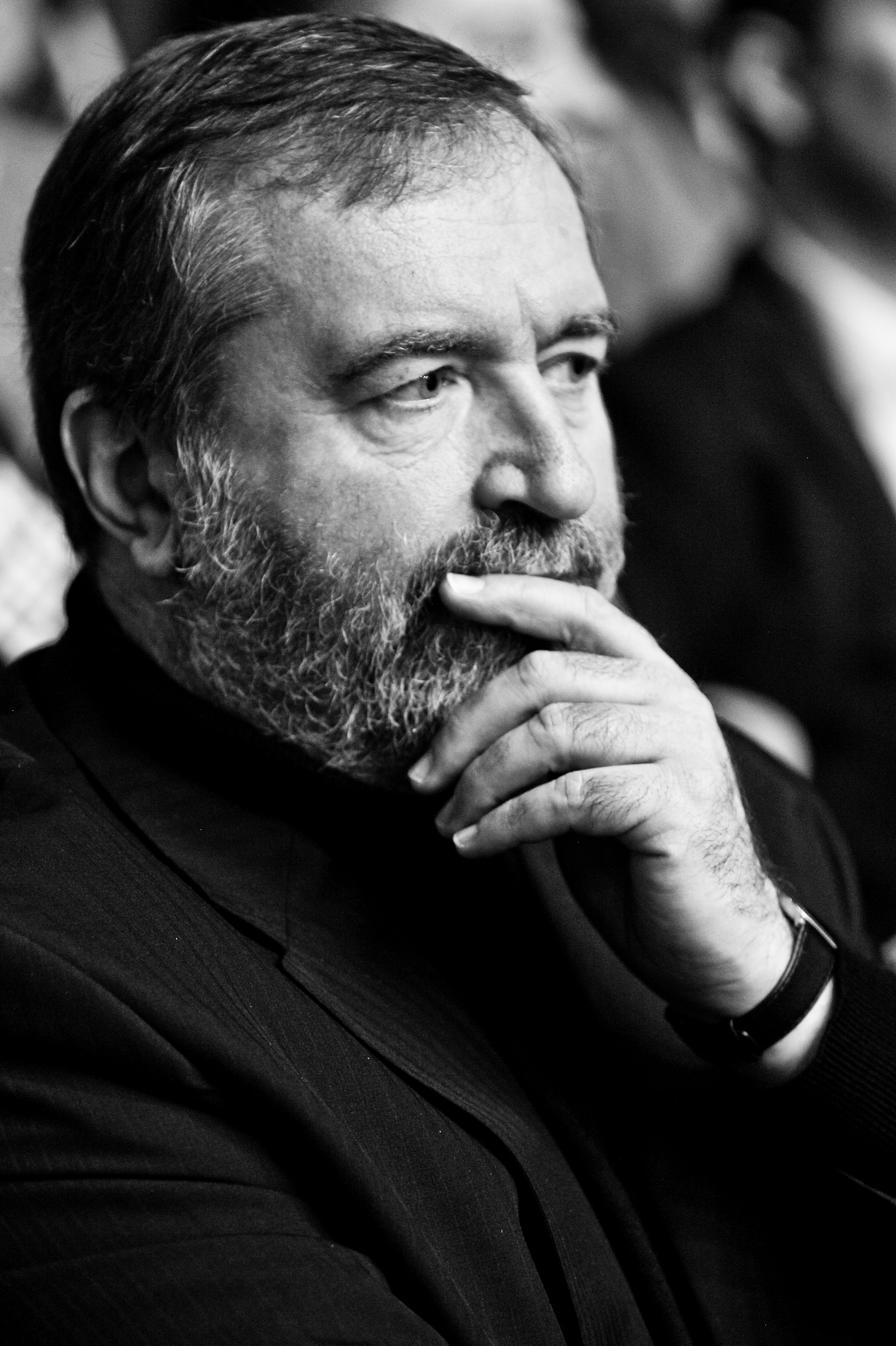

Deputy Speaker of the National Assembly
- In office 15 May 2002 – 13 May 2010

Personal details
- Born: 12 February 1958 Csömör, Hungary
- Died: 13 October 2020 (aged 62)
- Party: MSZMP, MSZP
- Spouse: Erzsébet Lantos
- Profession: politician, economist

László Mandur (2 February 1958 – 13 October 2020) was a Hungarian photographer, politician and economist, who served as one of the Deputy Speakers of the National Assembly of Hungary from 15 May 2002 to 13 May 2010. He was a member of the National Assembly of Hungary between 15 May 2002 and 18 November 2013.

== Political career ==
He finished his secondary studies in 1976. He graduated as a production engineer from the College of Transport, Telecommunications and Technology in 1979. He worked for Concrete Road Constructions Partnership as a building engineer of Budapest Airport Ferihegy 2 from 1979. He was a member of the Budapest Commission of the Communist Youth League from 1981 to 1989 - he was the secretary of 6th district, later of Budapest. He was managing director of Budapest Radio Ltd. from 1989, and managing director and chief executive officer of Antel Invest Ltd. from 1997 to 1998. He graduated from Budapest University of Economic Sciences in 1991, and he obtained qualification as a certified accountant in 1992. He was the managing director of Honline Ltd. from 1999, and of Trangon Bt. from 2000 to 2002. He was a member of the board, then chairman of Hortobágy Fish Farm Rt. from 1995 to 1997, and of the broadcasting company Antenna Hungária Rt. from 1996 to 1998. He was on the supervisory board of Óbuda Shipyard Island Property Management Company from 1996 to 1999. He was on the board of Water Works of Budapest Rt. from 1999 to 2000.

He was a founder of the Hungarian Socialist Party (MSZP) in 1989. He was member of the Budapest 3rd district presidium from 1994 to 1997, and from 1999 member of the Budapest party council. He was president of the Budapest branch of the Hungarian Socialist Party from 2000. He was co-chairman of the national economic department of the Hungarian Socialist Party from 1998 to 2000. He was head of the information society cabinet of the Socialist Party from 2001 to 2002. He was elected incumbent president of the Budapest branch on 22 February 2003. He did not stand for re-election as Budapest party president in the party elections at the congress in October 2004.

In December 1994 he ran for the office of mayor, he made it to the body of representatives of 3rd district, he was the parliamentary faction leader until 1997. He was an external member of the public procurement committee of the Budapest Assembly from 1998 to 2000. He ran in the May 1998 parliamentary elections. He participated in the work of the campaign group of Péter Medgyessy, candidate for PM, from 2001. He secured his seat in Parliament from the Budapest list in April 2002. He was a deputy speaker of the Parliament from 15 May 2002 to 13 May 2010. In the 2006 and 2010 parliamentary elections he obtained a mandate from national list.

Mandur resigned from his parliamentary seat on 18 November 2013 because he was appointed a board member of the Public Service Foundation. He served in this capacity until 2019.

== Personal life and Death ==
He was married to Erzsébet Lantos. László Mandur died on 13 October 2020, at the age of 62.
