= Bankfalu =

Kiskunfélegyháza, Hungary

Coordinates: 46.72669991206476°N 19.860837086091124°E

Bankfalu is a neighborhood in the north of Kiskunfélegyháza, Hungary. Bankfalu is the newest neighborhood in Kiskunfélegyháza.

== Notable residents ==
- György Mizsei: Hungarian boxer, who won a bronze medal in the light middleweight division at the 1992 Summer Olympics.
