= Social Democratic Party of Hungarian Gypsies =

Social Democratic Party of Hungarian Gypsies Magyarországi Cigányok Szociáldemokrata Pártja
- Leader: Pál Farkas
- Founded: 1 October 1989
- Dissolved: 22 February 1991
- Succeeded by: Romani Civil Rights Movement
- Newspaper: Élőszó
- Ideology: Social democracy Romani minority interests
- Political position: Left-wing

The Social Democratic Party of Hungarian Gypsies (Hungarian: Magyarországi Cigányok Szociáldemokrata Pártja; MCSZDP), was a short-lived social democrat political party in Hungary for the ethnic Romani minority, existed between 1989 and 1991.

== History ==
The MCSZDP held its inaugural meeting on 1 October 1989 with 90 members under the leadership of writer and journalist Pál Farkas, also President of the Cultural Association of Hungarian Gypsies and editor-in-chief of the Cigány Újság from 1986 to 1993. The party claimed itself as a sister party to the Hungarian Social Democratic Party (MSZDP). In its programme, called "Romani people, Europe with Us!", the MCSZDP emphasized the legal and economic integration of the Romani people and also fought against ethnic discrimination.

In November 1989, Farkas was elected to the presidency of the MSZDP. The two parties made an electoral cooperation for joint participation in the 1990 parliamentary election, but for the following months, the MCSZDP gradually moved away from its parent organization due internal conflicts. The MCSZDP was able to nominee only one candidate (Elemér Csemer in Pásztó constituency) in the 1990 national election, receiving 0.01 percent of the individual votes. After the failure, the party transformed itself into a civil organization, called Romani Civil Rights Movement.

== Election results ==
=== National Assembly ===
Election year	National Assembly				Government
Election year	# of overall votes	% of overall vote	# of overall seats won	+/–	Government
1990	613	0,01%	0 / 386		extra-parliamentary

== Sources ==
- Vida, István (2011). "Magyarországi Cigányok Szociáldemokrata Pártja (MCSZDP)". Magyarországi politikai pártok lexikona (1846–2010) [Encyclopedia of the Political Parties in Hungary (1846–2010)] (in Hungarian). Gondolat Kiadó. pp. 423–424. ISBN 978-963-693-276-3.
