= Kristóf Szatmáry =

Hungarian businessman and politician

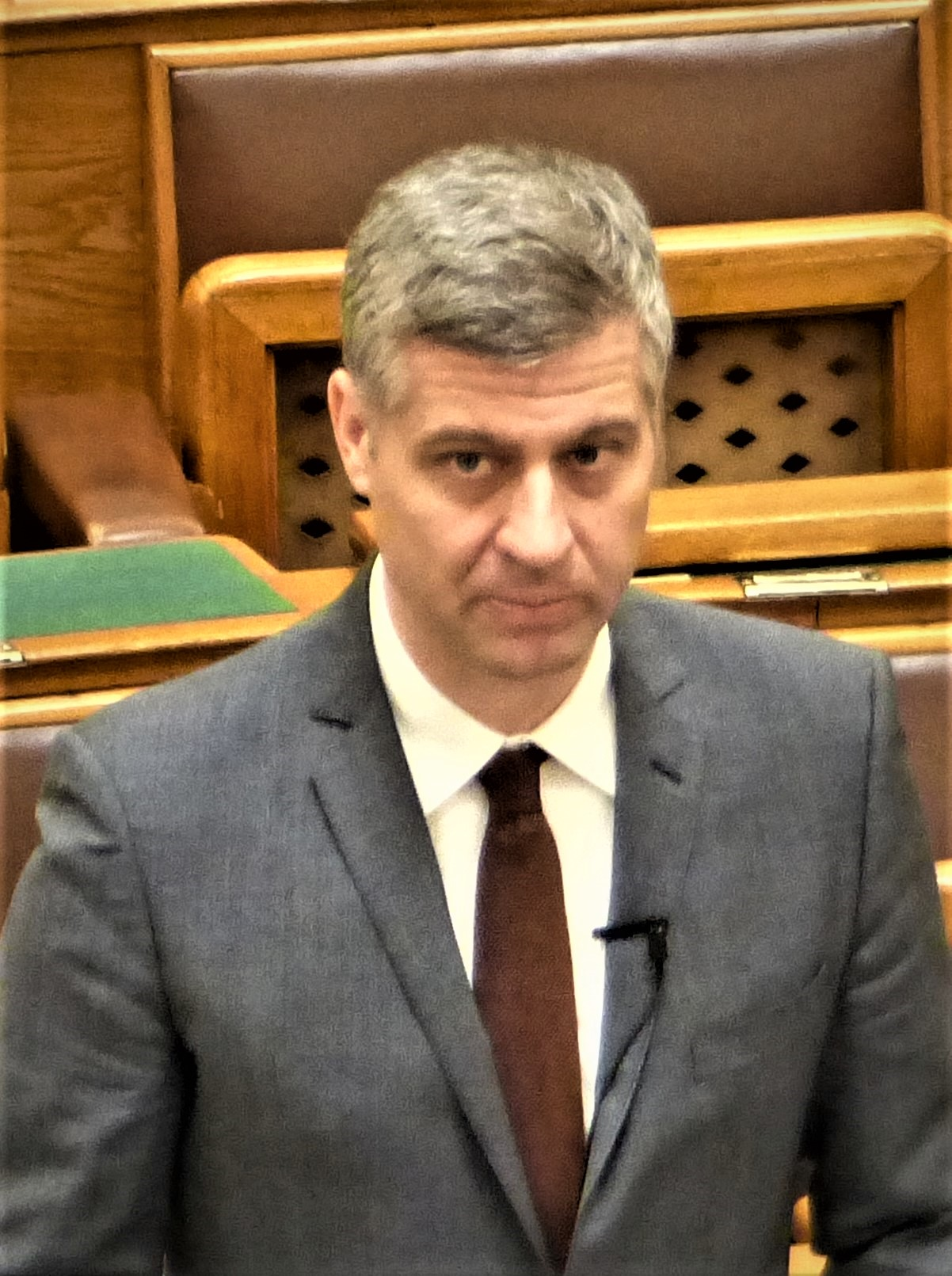

Member of the National Assembly
- Incumbent
- Assumed office 16 May 2006

Personal details
- Born: 10 June 1975 (age 51) Budapest, Hungary
- Party: Fidesz (since 1993)
- Other political affiliations: Entrepreneurs' Party
- Spouse: Beáta Simon
- Children: 4
- Profession: politician

Kristóf Szatmáry (born 10 June 1975) is a Hungarian entrepreneur and politician, who served as Secretary of State for Domestic Economy in the Ministry of National Economy between 1 February 2011 and 5 June 2014. As candidate of Fidesz, he became a member of the National Assembly (MP) in the 2006 parliamentary election.

== Studies and work experience ==
Szatmáry was born to a tradesman and craftsman family; his parents, László Szatmáry and Angéla Jähl were involved in the food trade from the 1980s. He participated in the family business from the age sixteen. After he passed the secondary school final examinations, he attended and graduated at the Faculty of Science and the Faculty of Law of Eötvös Loránd University. Parallel to his university education he was a contributor in Századvég Foundation.

In 1998 he founded a public opinion and market research company with his colleagues. From 2000 to 2002 he worked as a civil servant and gained a short but valuable experience there. He worked for the parliamentary department of the Ministry of Economy. From 2000 he was a secretary and from 2002 was head of department and also successfully took the special public administration examination. After the years in the ministry he came back to family business as a managing director. Theirs company gives work for approximately 30 people, they are in the catering industry and hotel business.

== Career ==
He joined Fidesz in 1993. He participated in the work of the General Assembly of 16th district of Budapest. Since 2002 he was elected member of the presidium of the Chamber of Commerce and Industry of District XVI in the spring of 2004 and then general vice president of the organization in October. He has been President of the National Board of Entrepreneurs' Party since October 2005.

In the parliamentary election held in 2006, he was elected from the Fidesz Budapest Regional List. He was appointed a member of the Economic and Information Technology Committee on 30 May 2006. He was re-elected MP in the 2010 parliamentary election. He served as Vice Chairman of the Economic and Information Technology Committee from 14 May 2010 to 14 February 2011. He was appointed Secretary of State for Domestic Economy in February 2011.

Szatmáry was elected President of the Organization of Budapest Chamber of Commerce and Industry (BKIK), holding the position from 2008 to 2016. He also served as President of the Hungarian Table Tennis Association between 2010 and 2011. Szatmáry was elected MP for District XVI, Budapest in 2014. He was re-elected in 2018. He is vice-chairman of the Enterprise Development Committee since 2014 and member of the Economic Committee since 2018.

== See also ==
- Overtime law, known as the "slave law"
