= Kálmán Kéri =

Hungarian military officer and politician (1901–1994)

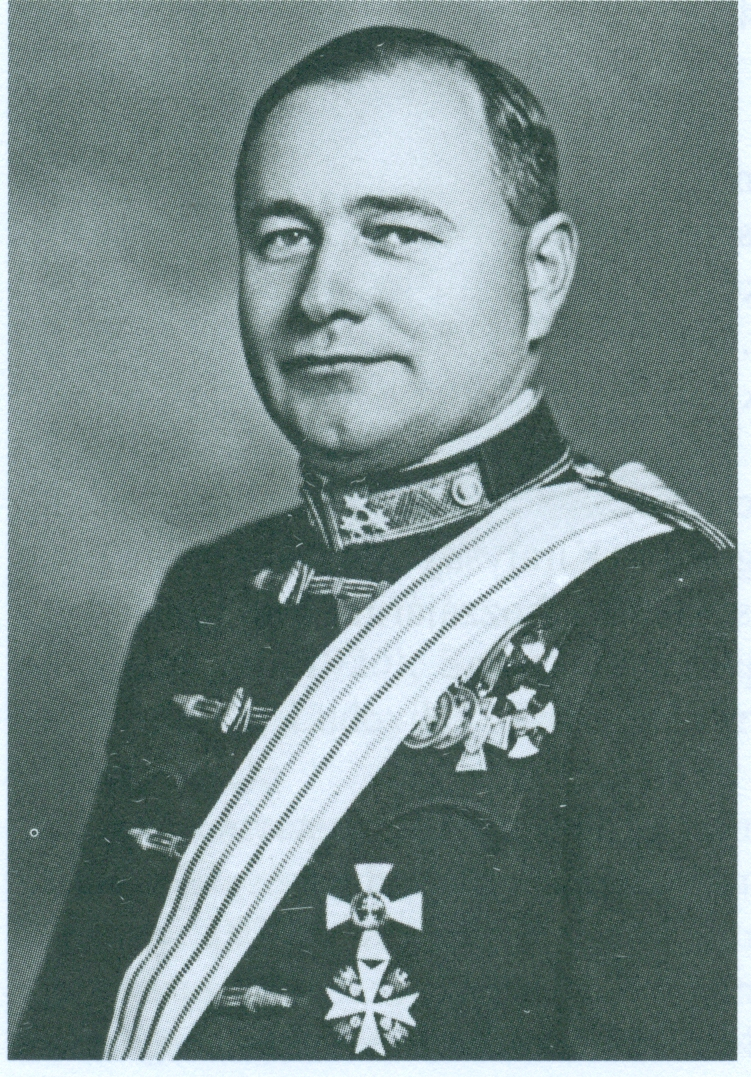
- Portrait of Kálmán Kéri, 1944
- Born: 25 June 1901; Igló, Austria-Hungary
- Died: 26 May 1994 (aged 92); Budapest, Hungary
- Military career
- Allegiance: Austria-Hungary; Hungarian Soviet Republic; Kingdom of Hungary; Republic of Hungary
- Rank: Colonel General
- Conflicts: World War I; Hungarian–Romanian War; World War II
- Awards: Order of the Flag of the Republic of Hungary with Laurel Wreath (1991); Grand Cross of the Order of Merit of the Republic of Hungary (1993)

Kálmán Kéri (25 June 1901 – 26 May 1994) was a Hungarian military officer and politician.

He studied in Nagyvárad (present-day Oradea) at the Royal Hungarian Military Artillery High School and after graduation he joined the Honvédség, the Hungarian part of the Austro-Hungarian army. Under the Hungarian Soviet Republic he joined the Red Army, on the order of Aurél Stromfeld, who was the commander of the Ludovica Military Academy before the revolution. After the war, he received an appointment to the Ludovica Academy and graduated as an artillery officer in 1921. After graduation, he started to work at the General Staff.

Between 1941 and 1942, he served as a military attaché, attached to the Hungarian Embassy in Bratislava. In 1942 he was promoted to Colonel and continued to serve at the General Staff as the adjutant and secretary to the Defence Minister Vilmos Nagy.

In 1944 he became the Chief of Staff of the VI Corps, and shortly after the Chief of Staff of the First Hungarian Army. When in October 1944 Regent Miklós Horthy announced the armistice with the Soviet Union in a nationwide radio address, Kéri approached the Soviet forces and joined the Hungarian armistice delegation in Moscow.

== After 1945 ==
In 1945, he became the military leader of the Ministry of Defence in the Interim government of General Béla Miklós. In the same year he was arrested for sabotage, but he was acquitted from all charges by the military tribunal. After that he was released from active duty.

In 1949 he was arrested again, and he transferred to the internment camp at Kistarcsa and after that to the Recsk Death Camp at the Recsk mine. He was released from there in 1953, when the camp was closed down, and he was sentenced retroactively to 4 years, 9 months term.

Until his retirement in 1966, he worked as a night watchman, unskilled labourer and as a storeman. He was rehabilitated in 1990 and he was promoted to Lieutenant general and in 1991 to General.

== After 1990 ==
In 1988 he was a founding member of the Recsk Alliance, an organization of former Recsk Death Camp prisoners. He became the member of the National Assembly on the 1990 elections as a representative of the MDF. He was the eldest member of that parliament and, in line with the tradition, he was the honorary chairman of the founding session of the new, democratically elected National Assembly. He became the member of the Home Defence Committee and he died one day before the end of the National Assembly's term, in 1994.

== Sources ==
- This page is the translation of the Hungarian Wikipedia (in Hungarian)Kéri Kálmán.
- Szabadon választott – Parlamenti Almanach 1990, Idegenforgalmi Propaganda és Kiadó Vállalat, Budapest, 1990, 154. old.
- Kálmán Kéri's opening address on the first session of the newly elected National Assembly, in 1990, (in Hungarian)
- On this day Kálmán Kéri born, article on mult-kor.hu, (in Hungarian)
- Kálmán Kéri on the memorial site of the Recsk Death Camp, (in Hungarian)

Honorary titles
Preceded by -	Oldest sitting Member of Parliament; 1990–1994	Succeeded by László Varga
