= Móra Ferenc Secondary School =

- Móra Ferenc Gimnázium

Location
- 9 Kossuht utca Kiskunfélegyháza, H-6100; Hungary
- Coordinates: 46.7116°N 19.8459°E

Information
- School type: secondary grammar school (gimnázium)
- Established: 1809
- Headmaster: Ferenc Rosta
- Language: Hungarian
- Website: Móra Ferenc Gimnázium

Móra Ferenc Secondary School (in Hungarian: Móra Ferenc Gimnázium) is a secondary grammar school in Kiskunfélegyháza, Hungary. It is the oldest secondary school in Kiskunfélegyháza, first opening in 1809.

== History ==
The school initially opened in 1809, with four classes. In 1891 the school became the primary grammar school for Kiskunfélegyháza.

== Notable alumni ==
- Ferenc Móra writer
- Piroska Szántó painter
- László Holló painter
- Lajos Holló politician
