= People of the Orient Party – Christian Democrats =

People of the Orient Party – Christian Democrats Kelet Népe Párt, Kereszténydemokraták
- Leader: Frigyes Szent-Tamási
- Founded: 21 October 1989
- Dissolved: 3 December 1998
- Succeeded by: People of the Orient Alliance – Christian National Defence Force (KNSZ–KNV)
- Newspaper: Kelet Népe
- Ideology: Christian nationalism Clerical fascism Royalism
- Political position: Far-right

The People of the Orient Party – Christian Democrats (Hungarian: Kelet Népe Párt, Kereszténydemokraták; KNP–KD), also known as simply People of the Orient Party, was a far-right clerical nationalist political party in Hungary.

== History ==
From Conservative liberalism and Christian democracy, the KNP–KD gradually changed its political position to national far-right party. Initially, the party strived for a neutral, independent parliamentary democratic Hungary, but its position changed by 1998, when under the banner "Faith, Home, Loyalty", the KNP–KD demanded the restoration of the 1000-year-old Kingdom of Hungary.

The KNP–KD participated the 1990 parliamentary election with only one candidate, who received 0.01 percent of the individual votes. On 11 March 1993 it became a founding member of the Christian National Unity led by the Independent Smallholders, Agrarian Workers and Civic Party (FKGP). For a short time, the KNP–KD also concluded an alliance with the neo-Nazi Albert Szabó's Party for World-National People's Supremacy (VNP), but also had a good relationship with the Hungarian Legitimist Party (MLGP) and the Hungarian Freedom Party, which split from the Freedom Party (SZP). The KNP–KD withdrew from contest in the 1994 parliamentary election. The KNP–KD abolished in December 1998 and succeeded by the People of the Orient Alliance – Christian National Defence Force (KNSZ–KNV) which, however, never actually functioned due Szent-Tamási's poor health then death.

== Election results ==
=== National Assembly ===
Election year	National Assembly				Government
Election year	# of overall votes	% of overall vote	# of overall seats won	+/–	Government
1990	346	0.01%	0 / 386		extra-parliamentary

== Sources ==
- Vida, István (2011). "Kelet Népe Párt, Kereszténydemokraták (KNP–KD)". Magyarországi politikai pártok lexikona (1846–2010) [Encyclopedia of the Political Parties in Hungary (1846–2010)] (in Hungarian). Gondolat Kiadó. pp. 365–366. ISBN 978-963-693-276-3.
