= Holy Crown Society =

Holy Crown Society Szent Korona Társaság
- Leader: Ferenc Dévényi
- Founder: Miklós Kállay
- Founded: 15 February 1989; 37 years ago
- Dissolved: April 5, 1990; 36 years ago (as party)
- Ideology: Holy Crown doctrine Legitimism; Ultraconservatism
- Political position: Right-wing

Website
- www.szentkoronatarsasag.hu

The Holy Crown Society (Hungarian: Szent Korona Társaság, pronounced [ˈsɛnt ˈkoronɒ ˈtaːrʃɒʃaːɡ]; SZKT), was a legitimist and ultra-conservative civil organization and a former political party in Hungary.

== History ==
Founded in February 1990, the Holy Crown Society considers itself as the legal successor of the first Holy Crown Society, existed between 1920 and 1948, the Holy Crown League founded in 1920 and the National Hungarian Holy Crown Alliance established in 1926. The SZKT was founded as a scientific group by historians, heraldists, constitutionalists for studying the Holy Crown of Hungary, its history and legal doctrine. Miklós Kállay de Nagykálló, Jr. (1918–1996), the son of the late Prime Minister Miklós Kállay, was elected President of the Holy Crown Society, while historian and academic István Kállay was appointed Secretary-General. The ultra-conservative Franciscan friar Othmár Faddy and historian Iván Bertényi, Sr. became vice-presidents.

After a lengthy debate, the SZKT decided to run in the 1990 parliamentary election and was registered as a party by the Metropolitan Court of Budapest. Its Somogy County branch joined the regional electoral alliance of Somogy County Christian Coalition (SKK). Beside this, the SZKT had two individual candidates in Körmend and Tiszavasvári, who received 0.04 percent of the individual votes. Meanwhile, the majority of the SZKT decided to continue the work as a tradition preserving social organization. Because of disputes, the organization split into two factions, when the newly formed Hungarian Holy Crown Alliance quit the SZKT, which dissolved as a party in April 1990.

== Election results ==
=== National Assembly ===
Election year	National Assembly				Government
Election year	# of overall votes	% of overall vote	# of overall seats won	+/–	Government
1990	1,906	0.04%	0 / 386		extra-parliamentary

== Sources ==
- Vida, István (2011). "Szent Korona Társaság (SZKT)". Magyarországi politikai pártok lexikona (1846–2010) [Encyclopedia of the Political Parties in Hungary (1846–2010)] (in Hungarian). Gondolat Kiadó. pp. 454–455. ISBN 978-963-693-276-3.
