= Entrepreneurs' Party =

Defunct political party in Hungary

The Entrepreneurs' Party (Hungarian: Vállalkozók Pártja, pronounced [ˈvaːlːɒlkozoːk ˈpaːrcɒ] VP) was a political party in Hungary between 1989 and 2007.

== History ==
The party was formed in October 1989. In the 1990 elections it received almost 2% of the vote, but failed to win a seat. Businessman Péter Zwack became party chairman in 1992, and the party formed several alliances prior to the 1994 elections, running joint candidates with the Agrarian Alliance, the Alliance of Free Democrats and Fidesz, as well as running its own independent campaign as the "Liberal Civic Alliance–Entrepreneurs Party". The party won a single seat, taken by Zwack.

The party ran alone and on a joint list with the New Alliance for Hungary in the 1998 elections, but failed to win a seat. It subsequently contested the 2002 and 2006 elections in alliance with Fidesz. On 13 January 2007, the VP had its party status removed and it was reclassified as a civil association as it was unable to run separately in the previous two elections. Following this decision, the VP was de facto integrated into Fidesz, resulting in party chairman Antal Császár leaving the Fidesz parliamentary group. His successors, István Herman and Kristóf Szatmáry were elected MPs as Fidesz candidates in the 2010 elections.
