= Alliance for the Village and Countryside =

Alliance for the Village and Countryside Szövetség a Faluért, a Vidékért
- President: Ferenc Wekler
- Founded: 23 January 1990
- Dissolved: 24 August 2001
- Ideology: Agrarianism; Regionalism
- Political position: Left-wing

The Alliance for the Village and Countryside (Hungarian: Szövetség a Faluért, a Vidékért; SZFV), was an agrarianist political party in Hungary, based in Baranya County.

== History ==
The SZFV made an electoral coalition with the Agrarian Alliance (ASZ), the two parties had two joint individual candidates for the 1990 parliamentary election, József Fabi in Szigetvár and SZFV leader Ferenc Wekler in Mohács. In addition to this, the party's two other politicians also ran solely (Jenő Gáspár in Pécs and Gyula Kóbor in Komló), all four of them in Baranya County. Surprisingly, Wekler won his constituency in the first round. After that he was also supported by the Alliance of Free Democrats (SZDSZ) and he obtained the mandate with 57.2 percent of the votes in the second round. In accordance with the electoral deal, Wekler joined the SZDSZ parliamentary group. The SZFV did not contest any further elections, it became technically defunct by August 2001, when the Baranya County Court ordered to dissolve the organization.

== Election results ==
=== National Assembly ===
Election year	National Assembly				Government
Election year	# of overall votes	% of overall vote	# of overall seats won	+/–	Government
1990^{1}	16,050	0.4%	1 / 386		in opposition

^{1} In an electoral alliance with the Agrarian Alliance (ASZ) in two constituencies out of four. SZFV leader and joint candidate Ferenc Wekler joined the SZDSZ caucus.

== Sources ==
- Vida, István (2011). "Szövetség a Faluért, a Vidékért (SZFV)". Magyarországi politikai pártok lexikona (1846–2010) [Encyclopedia of the Political Parties in Hungary (1846–2010)] (in Hungarian). Gondolat Kiadó. p. 457. ISBN 978-963-693-276-3.
