= Independent Social Democratic Party (Hungary) =

Independent Social Democratic Party Független Szociáldemokrata Párt
- First leader: András Révész
- Last leader: Dezső Guba
- Founded: 4 November 1989
- Dissolved: 2 October 1993
- Split from: Hungarian Social Democratic Party (MSZDP)
- Merged into: Hungarian Social Democratic Party (MSZDP)
- Ideology: Social democracy
- Political position: Left-wing

The Independent Social Democratic Party (Hungarian: Független Szociáldemokrata Párt; FSZDP), was a short-lived political party in Hungary, existed between 1989 and 1993.

== History ==
The FSZDP was founded by lawyer György Ruttner and his approximately fifty followers, who had formerly left the Hungarian Social Democratic Party (MSZDP) during its congress in November 1989, referring to disagreements with the leadership. Also prominent member were Ferenc Kitzinger, Pál Benyó, Szilárd Nyakas, Alfréd Sinkovics and Dezső Guba. Former MSZDP leader András Révész was elected leader of the new party. During its formation, two Members of Parliament also joined the party.

In January 1990, it became a member of the Hungarian Round Table Talks. Before the 1990 parliamentary election, the FSZDP concluded an electoral alliance with the Hungarian People's Party (MNP). The FSZDP had five individual candidates during the election and received 0.15 percent of the votes, gaining no seats. As a result, Ruttner, who already ran as a non-partisan candidate, decided to left the party. The new leadership under Dezső Guba joined the MSZDP's efforts to restoration of the Social Democrat unity. Just before the 1994 parliamentary election, the FSZDP and the Social Democrat People's Party (SZDNP) re-merged into the MSZDP in October 1993.

== Election results ==
=== National Assembly ===
Election year	National Assembly				Government
Election year	# of overall votes	% of overall vote	# of overall seats won	+/–	Government
1990	7,564	0,15%	0 / 386		extra-parliamentary

== Sources ==
- Vida, István (2011). "Független Szociáldemokrata Párt (FSZDP)". Magyarországi politikai pártok lexikona (1846–2010) [Encyclopedia of the Political Parties in Hungary (1846–2010)] (in Hungarian). Gondolat Kiadó. pp. 357–358. ISBN 978-963-693-276-3.
