= Hungarian Workers' Democratic Center Party =

Hungarian Workers' Democratic Center Party Magyar Dolgozók Demokratikus Centrum Párt
- Leader: Tibor Majoros
- Founded: 17 December 1989
- Dissolved: 26 May 1993
- Political position: Centre

The Hungarian Workers' Democratic Center Party (Hungarian: Magyar Dolgozók Demokratikus Centrum Párt; MDDCP), was a minor political party in Hungary between 1989 and 1993.

== History ==
The party was established by Tibor Majoros, previously a Hungarian Democratic Forum (MDF) politician, and his followers in Tápiószele. According to its programme, the MDDCP represented the interests of the manual workers, pensioners and women's equality. The party declared its distance from the Hungarian Socialist Party (MSZP) and all opposition parties, excluding Fidesz. Majoros was the party's only candidate in the 1990 parliamentary election and received 973 votes, gaining 0.02 percent of the votes. The MDDCP dissolved in May 1993.

== Election results ==
=== National Assembly ===
Election year	National Assembly				Government
Election year	# of overall votes	% of overall vote	# of overall seats won	+/–	Government
1990	973	0.02%	0 / 386		extra-parliamentary

== Sources ==
- Vida, István (2011). "Magyar Dolgozók Demokratikus Centrum Párt (MDDCP)". Magyarországi politikai pártok lexikona (1846–2010) [Encyclopedia of the Political Parties in Hungary (1846–2010)] (in Hungarian). Gondolat Kiadó. p. 391. ISBN 978-963-693-276-3.
