= János Latorcai =

Hungarian engineer and politician

János Latorcai MP
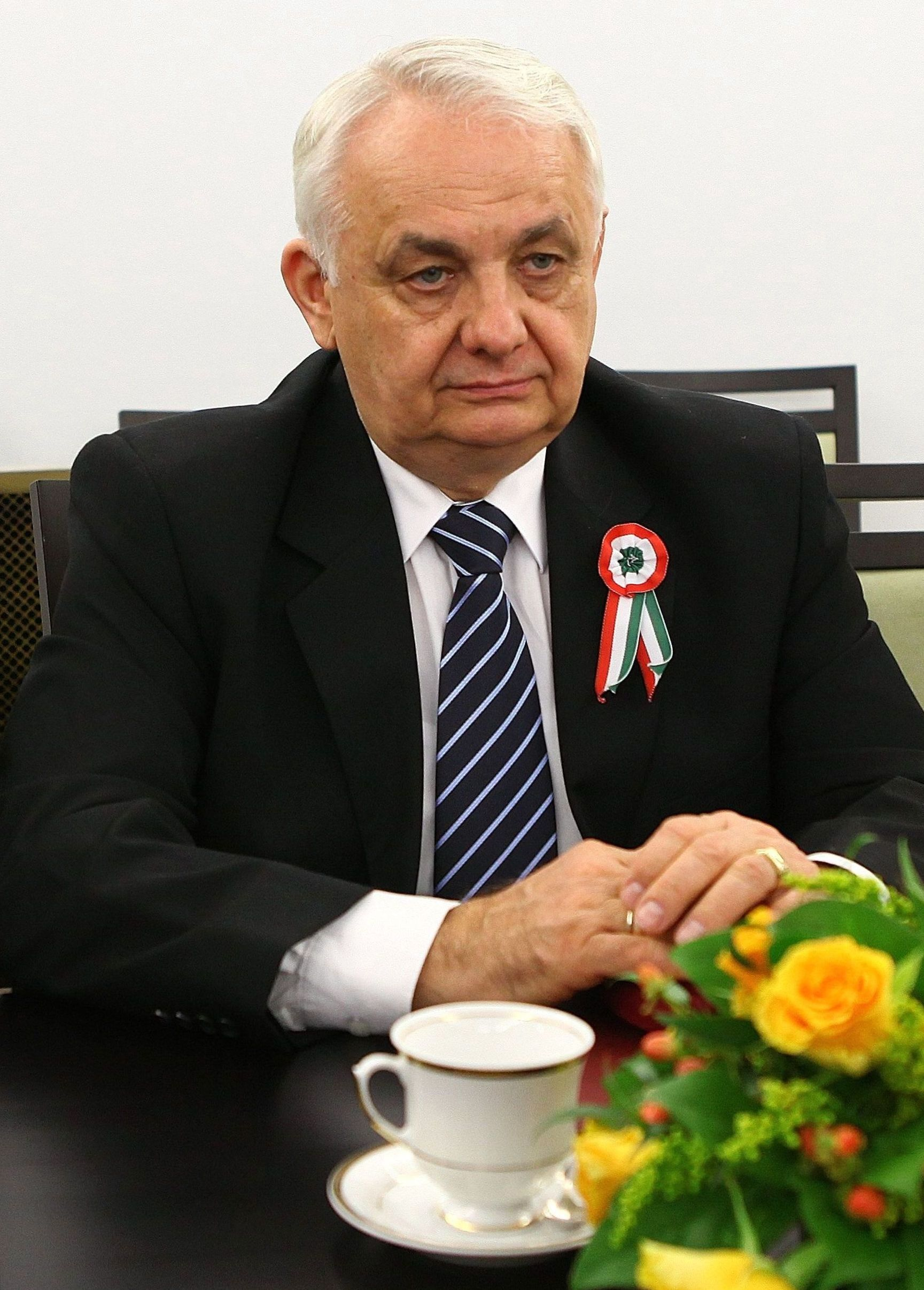
- Latorcai in the Polish Senate (2012)

Deputy Speaker of the National Assembly
- In office 14 May 2010 – 8 May 2026

Personal details
- Born: 9 May 1944 (age 81) Békés, Hungary
- Party: KDNP (1993–1997; 2002–present); Fidesz (1997–2002)
- Children: 2 (including Csaba Latorcai)
- Profession: Engineer, politician

János Latorcai (born 9 May 1944) is a Hungarian engineer and politician, who served as Minister of Industry and Trade from 1993 to 1994. As a politician of KDNP and Fidesz, he was a Member of Parliament from 1994 to 2026. He served as a Deputy Speaker of the National Assembly from 2010 to 2026.

== Biography ==
He was born in Békés on 9 May 1944. He finished Mezőtúr Secondary School and Esztergom Higher Technical School of Chemical Engineering in 1965. He acquired a degree in mechanical engineering in 1971 and a technical doctorate in 1976 at the Technical University of Heavy Industry in Miskolc. He was a researcher of the Textile Industry Research Institute from 1965 to 1971. He worked as an assistant lecturer for the College of Food Industry in 1971. He worked in the Ministry of Labour first as researcher in 1975, then as deputy head of department. He was senior lecturer at the University of Technology in Budapest from 1976 to 1992. From 1989 he worked for the service provider subsidiary of FÉG as senior engineer, then as production development engineer, deputy CEO and finally CEO. He worked in the Ministry of Industry and Trade as head of the Industrial Economy Department in 1991 and as head of the Industrial Policy Department from 1992. He was a member of the corporate council of Rába Rt. from 1991 and later its chairman of the board. He has joined several non-profit organisations. He served as Minister of Industry and Trade in the Antall and Boross cabinets from February 1993 to July 1994.

He joined the Christian Democratic People's Party (KDNP) in 1993. He was the party's vice president from 1994 to 1995 and presided over the National Board from 1995 to 1997. He was one of the founders of the Hungarian Christian Democratic Alliance (MKDSZ) in August 1997 and has been its vice president since. He was vice president of the restructured Christian Democratic People's Party from 2002. He has been president of the National Board since 2003.

He was a Member of Parliament from 1994, elected from the national list of his party in 1994, and from Constituency 5, Esztergom, Komárom-Esztergom County in 1998. He ran as a candidate of the conservative parties for the post of mayor of Budapest in 1994 and 1998. He resigned from his seat in the Assembly. He joined the parliamentary faction of Fidesz in September 1997 and was deputy parliamentary faction leader until May 2002. He chaired the Economic Committee from 1998 to 2002. He was elected to Parliament from the county list in April 2002. He served as deputy chairman of the Economic Committee from 2002 to 2006. In the 2006 parliamentary elections he obtained a mandate from national list. From 30 May 2006 he was a vice-chairman of the Economic and Information Technology Committee. After the 2010 parliamentary election he was appointed one of the deputy speakers of the National Assembly of Hungary. He was re-elected as deputy speaker in 2014, 2018 and 2022 too. He retired from politics after the 2026 Hungarian parliamentary election.

A new land law was developed and passed on 21 June 2013. Pro-government MPs passed a controversial new land law amid raucous protests in Parliament and the resignation of József Ángyán, a high-profile lawmaker from the governing party. The protesting MPs, led by Jobbik head Gábor Vona, were ordered by deputy speaker Latorcai to vacate the lectern, but they refused, leading to a delay in the session and the exclusion of the protesters from the vote. As the votes were being counted, Jobbik lawmakers shouted slogans including "Traitors" and "No, no, never," the latter a traditional protest chant against the post-World War I Treaty of Trianon.

== Personal life ==
He is married and has two children. His wife is an economist and an icon painter. He has two adult children, his elder son Csaba Latorcai is a former member of the body of representatives in Budapest 2nd District. He was elected MP in 2026.

Political offices
Preceded by Iván Szabó	Minister of Industry and Trade; 1993–1994	Succeeded by László Pál
