= Party for Rural Hungary =

Hungarian political party

Party for Rural Hungary Vidéki Magyarországért Párt
- Founded: 20 November 1989
- Dissolved: 1990
- Ideology: Agrarianism

The Party for Rural Hungary (Hungarian: Vidéki Magyarországért Párt; VMP), was an agrarianist political party in Hungary.

The party, founded in Tiszaderzs, contested in the 1990 parliamentary election with one individual candidate (Dezső Herédy) for Karcag (Jász-Nagykun-Szolnok County Constituency VIII), but did not obtain a mandate. After 1990 the VMP did not contest any further elections and became technically defunct. During the 1990 local elections, Herédy was elected mayor of Tiszaderzs, holding the position until 1992 and from 2002 to 2014.

== Election results ==
=== National Assembly ===
Election year	National Assembly				Government
Election year	# of overall votes	% of overall vote	# of overall seats won	+/–	Government
1990	690	0.01%	0 / 386		extra-parliamentary

== Sources ==
- Vida, István (2011). "Vidéki Magyarországért Párt (VMP)". Magyarországi politikai pártok lexikona (1846–2010) [Encyclopedia of the Political Parties in Hungary (1846–2010)] (in Hungarian). Gondolat Kiadó. p. 465. ISBN 978-963-693-276-3.
