= István Herman =

Hungarian entrepreneur and politician (1947–2021)

Member of the National Assembly
- In office 14 May 2010 – 5 May 2014

Personal details
- Born: 16 October 1947 Aldebrő, Hungary
- Died: 21 October 2021 (aged 74)
- Party: Fidesz (2006–2021)
- Other political affiliations: Hungarian Democratic Forum; Entrepreneurs' Party
- Children: Two
- Profession: Businessman, politician

István Ervin Herman (16 October 1947 – 21 October 2021) was a Hungarian entrepreneur and politician, member of the National Assembly (MP) for Füzesabony (Heves County Constituency VI) from 2010 to 2014.

== Biography ==
Herman finished his secondary studies at the Dobó István Grammar School in Eger from 1963 to 1967. He learned zincography in the Kossuth Press in Budapest. He graduated in pedagogy from the Eszterházy Károly College of Eger in 2002.

=== Entrepreneurial career ===
Herman co-founded the Grafotip Advertising and Trading Ltd. in 1989. He was appointed President of the Heves County Chamber of Crafts in 1995. He was the "Entrepreneur of the Year" in 1999.

=== Political career ===
Herman served as a representative in the Eger Assembly from 1990 to 1994. He was a member of the Committee on Budgets between 1994 and 1998. He became a member of the Heves County General Assembly in 1998.

He functioned as deputy chairman of the Hungarian Democratic Forum (MDF) in Heves County between 2002 and 2005. He joined the Entrepreneurs' Party on 30 October 2005. He was elected chairman of the party on 18 October 2006, however the previous leader Antal Császár refused to recognize the victory, referring to formal reasons. Császár directed the case to legal proceedings who, finally, won the lawsuit in August 2008. Proceedings were initiated on suspicion of money laundering against Herman and his deputy chairman Tamás Janzsó in November 2007, because they opened a private account for managing the finances of the party, while the slush fund was blocked by the Court.

Herman joined Fidesz in 2006 and became chairman of the 6th constituency of Heves County. He was elected to the National Assembly from that constituency in 2010. He was a member of the Committee on Audit Office and Budget since 14 May 2010 and of the Economic and Information Technology Committee since 14 February 2011.

== Personal life ==
Herman was married and had two sons. He died on 21 October 2021, aged 74.
