= István Jakab =

Hungarian agronomist and politician

István Jakab MP
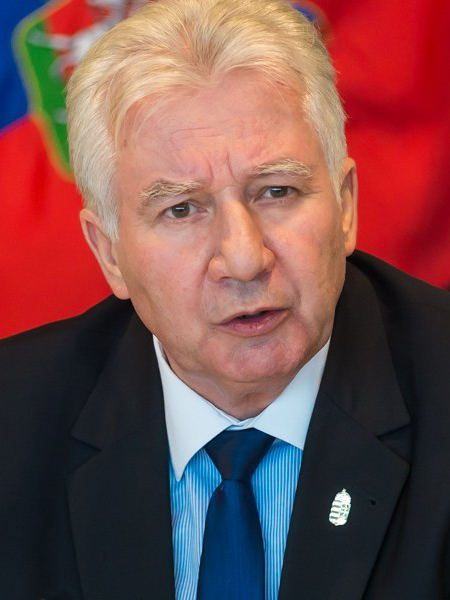
- Jakab in 2015

Deputy Speaker of the National Assembly
- In office 14 May 2010 – 8 May 2026

Member of the National Assembly
- In office 16 May 2006 – 8 May 2026

Personal details
- Born: 17 September 1949 (age 76) Hajdúbagos, Hungary
- Party: MDF (1988–1995); Fidesz (2006–present)
- Children: 3
- Occupation: Agronomist, politician

István Jakab (born 17 September 1949) is a Hungarian agronomist, politician and leader of the National Federation Of Hungarian Peasants Association And Cooperatives (MAGOSZ).

He was a founding member of the Hungarian Democratic Forum in 1988. He quit the party in 1995 and became co-chairman of the MAGOSZ and Vice President of the Hungarian Chamber of Agriculture, a position which he held until 2001. He was elected a member of the presidency of the National Cooperative Council in 1996. He has served as the sole chairman of the MAGOSZ since 1999. In this capacity, he organized the tractor farmers' protest to Budapest in early 2005, during which the capital was blocked.

His organization made an alliance with Fidesz for the 2006 parliamentary election. He gained a parliamentary seat from the Szabolcs-Szatmár-Bereg County party list. He served as deputy chairman of the Committee of Agriculture and deputy leader of the Fidesz parliamentary fraction.

After the 2010 parliamentary election he was elected to the National Assembly of Hungary again. His party nominated him for the position of one of the deputy speakers of the National Assembly of Hungary. He was re-elected as deputy speaker in 2014, 2018 and 2022. After the 2026 Hungarian parliamentary election, where Fidesz–KDNP suffered a heavy defeat and fell from power, Jakab did not take up his mandate.

== Personal life ==
He is married and has three children.
