= Krisztián Kapus =

Hungarian politician

Mayor of Kiskunfélegyháza
- In office 3 October 2010 – 12 October 2014
- Preceded by: József Ficsór
- Succeeded by: József Csányi

Member of the National Assembly
- In office 14 May 2010 – 5 May 2014

Personal details
- Born: 14 January 1974 (age 52) Kiskunfélegyháza, Hungary
- Party: Fidesz
- Children: 3
- Profession: politician

Krisztián Kapus (born January 14, 1974) is a Hungarian politician, member of the National Assembly (MP) for Kiskunfélegyháza (Bács-Kiskun County Constituency V) between 2010 and 2014. He served as mayor of his birthplace from October 2010 to October 2014.

Kapus was a member of the Committee on Youth, Social, Family, and Housing Affairs since May 14, 2010. He also served as Chairman of the Subcommittee on Youth since June 28, 2010.

== Personal life ==
He is married and has three children.
