= Alajos Dornbach =

Hungarian politician (1936–2021)

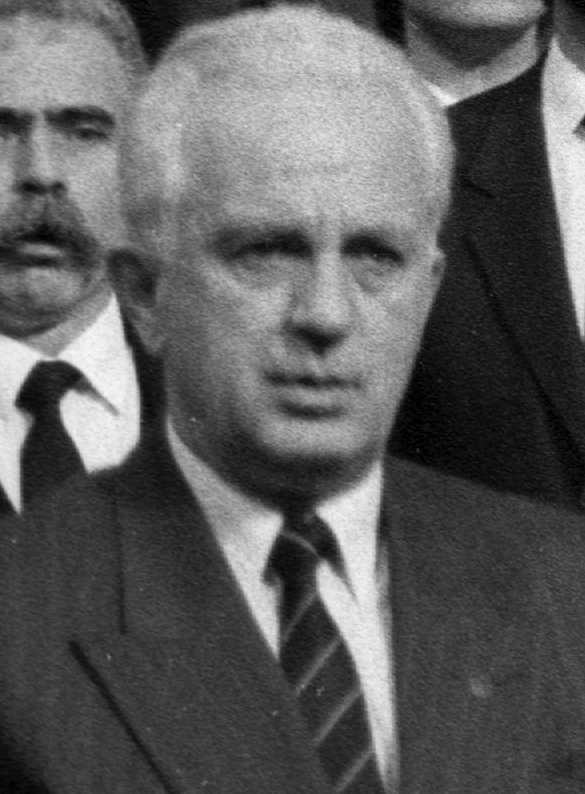
- Dornbach in 1990

Member of the National Assembly
- In office 2 May 1990 – 14 May 2002

Personal details
- Born: 21 January 1936 Ózd, Hungary
- Died: 3 June 2021 (aged 85)
- Party: SZDSZ
- Profession: politician, lawyer

Alajos Dornbach (21 January 1936 – 3 June 2021) was a Hungarian lawyer and politician, member of the National Assembly (MP) from 1990 to 2002. As a politician of the Alliance of Free Democrats (SZDSZ), Dornbach served as one of the deputy speakers of the National Assembly between 1990 and 1994.

He graduated from the Faculty of Law of the Eötvös Loránd University.

Dornbach died on 3 June 2021, at the age of 85.
