= György Csóti =

Hungarian politician (born 1940)

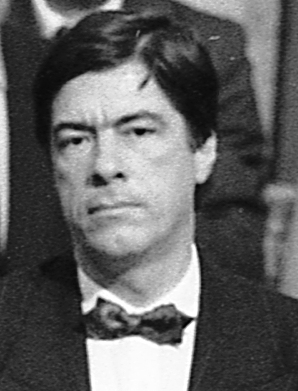
- György Csóti in 1990

Member of the National Assembly
- In office 23 December 2011 – 5 May 2014
- In office 2 May 1990 – 17 June 1998

Personal details
- Born: 24 November 1940 (age 85) Budapest, Hungary
- Party: Fidesz
- Other political affiliations: MDF (1988-2004)
- Profession: politician

György Csóti (born November 24, 1940) is a Hungarian politician, member of the National Assembly (MP) from Budapest Regional List between 2011 and 2014. Formerly he was also a member of the National Assembly from 1990 to 1998 (1990-94: MDF National List; 1994-98: MP for Budapest I).

Csóti was a founding member of the Hungarian Democratic Forum (MDF) between 1988 and 2004. He served as Deputy Parliamentary Group Leader from 1996 to 1998. He became Member of Parliament again via the Fidesz party's Budapest Regional List when Zsolt Láng won the by-election in the 2nd District of Budapest and became representative of its constituency. He is a former Deputy Chairman and member of the Committee on Foreign Affairs.

He also served as Hungarian Ambassador to Croatia from 1999 to 2003. Csóti worked for Echo TV as a broadcaster of the foreign policy program between 2005 and 2011. He functioned as the Foreign Policy Advisor for Hungarian President Pál Schmitt from September 1, 2010 to December 23, 2011.
