= Gábor Világosi =

Hungarian politician and jurist

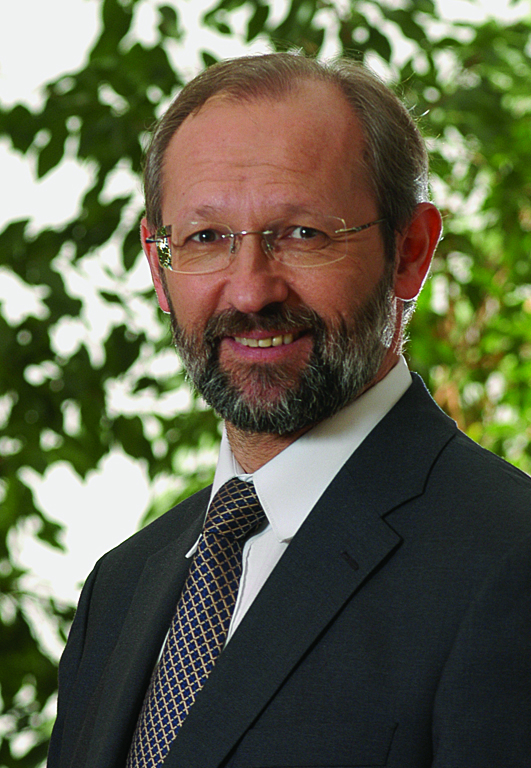

Deputy Speaker of the National Assembly of Hungary
- In office 16 September 2004 – 13 May 2010

Personal details
- Born: 12 January 1956 (age 70) Devecser, Hungary
- Party: SZDSZ
- Spouse: Klára Szentiványi
- Children: Gabriella; Dóra; Márton; Mihály
- Profession: politician, jurist

Gábor Világosi (born January 12, 1956) is a Hungarian politician and jurist, who served as one of the Deputy Speakers of the National Assembly of Hungary from September 16, 2004 to May 13, 2010. He was a member of the National Assembly of Hungary between 1990 and 2010. He was a founding member of the Alliance of Free Democrats. He left the party in 2010.

== Personal life ==
He is since 1982. His wife is Klára Szentiványi. They have four children - two daughters, Gabriella, Dóra and two sons, Márton, Mihály
