= Ferenc Gömbös =

Hungarian dentist and politician

Member of the National Assembly
- In office 2 May 1990 – 27 June 1994

Personal details
- Born: 10 May 1944 Devecser, Hungary
- Died: 17 July 2003 (aged 59) Sárvár, Hungary
- Party: MDF (1989–1997); MDNP (1997–2003)
- Profession: dentist, politician

Dr. Ferenc Gömbös (10 May 1944 – 17 July 2003) was a Hungarian dentist and politician, member of the National Assembly (MP) for Sárvár (Vas County Constituency IV) between 1990 and 1994. He also served as Mayor of Jánosháza from 1998 until his death.

== Biography ==
He graduated as a dentist from the Medical University of Budapest (today: Semmelweis University). He resided Jánosháza since 1967. He joined Hungarian Democratic Forum (MDF) in January 1989. He founded the party's local board in Jánosháza and became its leader. He was elected as Member of Parliament for Sárvár during the first democratic parliamentary election in 1990. He became a member of the Committee on Human Rights, Minority and Religious Affairs on 15 June 1993. He unsuccessfully ran for a parliamentary seat in the 1994 legislative election. Between 1994 and 1998 he politicized in the General Assembly of Vas County, where he worked in the Committee on Health. He served as President of the Vas County Board of the MDF from 1992 to 1997.

Gömbös was elected mayor of Jánosháza in 1998. During his term the construction of sewage systems were completed, roads were renovated and public lighting were also modernized. He, among others, left the MDF and joined Hungarian Democratic People's Party (MDNP). He served as president of the party until 2002. He died in a car accident on 17 July 2003.
