= National Smallholders' and Civic Party =

National Smallholders' and Civic Party Nemzeti Kisgazda- és Polgári Párt
- Honorary President: Dezső Futó
- President: Imre Boross
- Founded: 22 December 1989
- Dissolved: 6 November 1993
- Split from: Independent Smallholders' Party (FKGP)
- Merged into: United Smallholders' Party (EKGP)
- Ideology: Agrarianism; National liberalism
- Political position: Centre-right

The National Smallholders' and Civic Party (Hungarian: Nemzeti Kisgazda- és Polgári Párt), known mostly by its acronym NKPP or its shortened form National Smallholders' Party (Hungarian: Nemzeti Kisgazdapárt), was a short-lived agrarianist national liberal political party in Hungary, formed in December 1989, after having several members quit or expelled from the Independent Smallholders, Agrarian Workers and Civic Party (FKGP) in the previous months.

The party contested the 1990 parliamentary election, receiving only 0.2 percent of the votes and won no seats. After that majority of the party re-joined the FKGP, however the Szeged branch of the NKPP led by Zsolt Lányi remained as a separate organization. The organizing of the party was not successful. Finally, the rest of the party joined the pro-government United Smallholders' Party (EKGP) on 6 November 1993.

== Election results ==
=== National Assembly ===
Election year	National Assembly				Government
Election year	# of overall votes	% of overall vote	# of overall seats won	+/–	Government
1990	9,944	0,2%	0 / 386		extra-parliamentary

== Sources ==
- Vida, István (2011). "Nemzeti Kisgazda és Polgári Párt (NKPP)". Magyarországi politikai pártok lexikona (1846–2010) [Encyclopedia of the Political Parties in Hungary (1846–2010)] (in Hungarian). Gondolat Kiadó. pp. 436–437. ISBN 978-963-693-276-3.
