= List of deputy speakers of the National Assembly of Hungary =

Deputy speakers of the National Assembly of Hungary.

== 1990–1994 ==
Name	Period	Party
György Szabad	2 May 1990 – 3 August 1990	MDF
Alajos Dornbach	3 August 1990 – 27 June 1994	SZDSZ
Mátyás Szűrös	2 May 1990 – 27 June 1994	MSZP
Vince Vörös	2 May 1990 – 27 June 1994	FKGP

== 1994–1998 ==
Name	Period	Party
Mária Kóródi	28 June 1994 – 17 June 1998	SZDSZ
Ágnes G. Nagyné Maczó	28 June 1994 – 3 October 1997	FKGP
Sándor Kávássy	11 November 1997 – 17 June 1998	FKGP
László Salamon	28 June 1994 – 10 March 1996	MDF
Tibor Füzessy	16 April 1996 – 15 July 1997	KDNP
János Áder	9 September 1997 – 17 June 1998	Fidesz

== 1998–2002 ==
Name	Period	Party
Katalin Szili	18 June 1998 – 14 May 2002	MSZP
Géza Gyimóthy	18 June 1998 – 19 September 2001	FKGP
Ferenc Wekler	18 June 1998 – 14 May 2002	SZDSZ

== 2002–2006 ==
Name	Period	Party
László Mandur	15 May 2002 – 15 May 15, 2006	MSZP
József Szájer	15 May 2002 – 31 January 2004	Fidesz
Tamás Deutsch-Für	1 Februar 2004 – 15 May 2006	Fidesz
Péter Harrach	27 May 2002 – 15 May 2006	Fidesz
Ferenc Wekler	15 May 2002 – 15 September 2004	SZDSZ
Gábor Világosi	16 September 2004 – 15 May 2006	SZDSZ
Ibolya Dávid	27 May 2002 – 8 November 2004	MDF
Ibolya Dávid	15 November 2004 – 15 May 2006	MDF

== 2006–2010 ==
Name	Period	Party
László Mandur	8 June 2006 – 13 May 2010	MSZP
János Áder	16 May 2006 – 13 July 2009	Fidesz
Ildikó Pelczné Gáll	14 July 2009 – 13 May 2010	Fidesz
Péter Harrach	8 June 2006 – 13 May 2010	KDNP
Sándor Lezsák	8 June 2006 – 13 May 2010	Fidesz
Gábor Világosi	16 May 2006 – 13 May 2010	SZDSZ

== 2010–2014 ==
Name	Period	Party
István Jakab	14 May 2010 – 5 May 2014	Fidesz
Sándor Lezsák	14 May 2010 – 5 May 2014	Fidesz
István Ujhelyi	14 May 2010 – 5 May 2014	MSZP
Zoltán Balczó	14 May 2010 – 5 May 2014	Jobbik
János Latorcai	14 May 2010 – 5 May 2014	KDNP

== 2014–2018 ==
Name	Period	Party
István Jakab	6 May 2014 – 7 May 2018	Fidesz
Sándor Lezsák	6 May 2014 – 7 May 2018	Fidesz
István Hiller	6 May 2014 – 7 May 2018	MSZP
Tamás Sneider	6 May 2014 – 7 May 2018	Jobbik
János Latorcai	6 May 2014 – 7 May 2018	KDNP

Deputy Speakers for Legislation

Since 2014, the Chairpersons of the Legislative Committee are also ex officio Deputy Speakers for Legislation:

Name	Period	Party
Gergely Gulyás	6 May 2014 – 1 October 2017	Fidesz
Csaba Hende	2 October 2017 – 7 May 2018	Fidesz

== 2018–2022 ==
Name	Period	Party
István Jakab	8 May 2018 – 1 May 2022	Fidesz
Sándor Lezsák	8 May 2018 – 1 May 2022	Fidesz
Tamás Sneider	8 May 2018 – 27 May 2020	Jobbik
Koloman Brenner	3 July 2020 – 1 May 2022	Jobbik
János Latorcai	8 May 2018 – 1 May 2022	KDNP
István Hiller	8 May 2018 – 1 May 2022	MSZP

Deputy Speakers for Legislation

Name	Period	Party
Csaba Hende	8 May 2018 – 1 May 2022	Fidesz

== 2022–2026 ==
Name	Period	Party
István Jakab	2 May 2022 – 8 May 2026	Fidesz
Sándor Lezsák	2 May 2022 – 8 May 2026	Fidesz
János Latorcai	2 May 2022 – 8 May 2026	KDNP
Lajos Oláh	2 May 2022 – 8 May 2026	DK
Dóra Dúró	2 May 2022 – 8 May 2026	MHM

Deputy Speakers for Legislation

Name	Period	Party
Csaba Hende	2 May 2022 – 31 May 2025	Fidesz
Sándor Fazekas	11 June 2025 – 8 May 2026	Fidesz

== 2026–present ==
Name	Period	Party
Anikó Hallerné Nagy	9 May 2026 –	Tisza
Krisztián Kőszegi	9 May 2026 –	Tisza
Eszter Vitályos	13 May, 2026 –	Fidesz
Csaba Latorcai	13 May, 2026 –	KDNP
Dóra Dúró	9 May 2026 –	MHM

Deputy Speakers for Legislation

Name	Period	Party
Richárd Rák	9 May 2026 –	Tisza

== Sources ==
- Official website
