= Agrarian Alliance =

Defunct political party in Hungary

The Agrarian Alliance – National Agrarian Party (Hungarian: Agrárszövetség – Nemzeti Agrár Párt, ASZ) was a political party in Hungary.

== History ==
The alliance was formed in December 1989. In the March 1990 elections it ran alone in some constituencies, and in alliances with the Alliance for the Village and Countryside, the Patriotic Electoral Coalition and the Hungarian Socialist Party (MSZP) in others, winning two seats.

The 1994 elections saw the ASZ form alliance with the Alliance of Free Democrats, Fidesz and the Entrepreneurs' Party, with the party reduced to a single seat.

In the 1998 elections the party renewed its alliance with the Hungarian Socialist Party. It did not run as a separate party, but its members were given places on the MSZP list.
