= Kiskunfélegyháza =

- Town
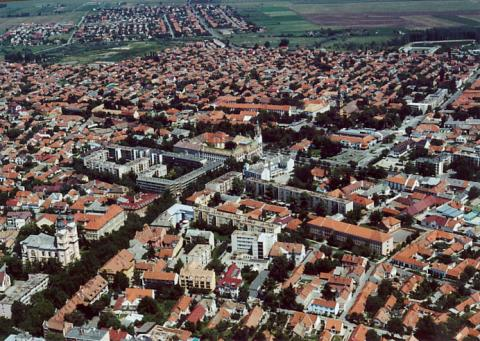
- Aerial view

- Flag Coat of arms

- Location of Kiskunfélegyháza Kiskunfélegyháza (Europe)
- Coordinates: 46.70520°N 19.85005°E
- Country: Hungary
- County: Bács-Kiskun
- District: Kiskunfélegyháza

Government
  - Mayor: József Csányi (Nemzeti Fórum)

Area
  - Total: 256.30 km^{2} (98.96 sq mi)
- Highest elevation: 105 m (344 ft)
- Lowest elevation: 90 m (300 ft)

Population (2023)
  - Total: 28,803
  - Density: 112.38/km^{2} (291.1/sq mi)
- Time zone: UTC+1 (CET)
  - Summer (DST): UTC+2 (CEST)
- Postal code: 6100
- Area code: (+36) 76
- Website: kiskunfelegyhaza.hu

Kiskunfélegyháza (Hungarian pronunciation: [ˈkiʃkunfeːlɛɟaːzɒ]) is a city in Bács-Kiskun County, Hungary.

== Geography ==
Kiskunfélegyháza is located in the middle of the Great Hungarian Plain, 130 kilometres (81 mi) southeast from Budapest. M5 motorway, Highway 5, 451, Budapest–Cegléd–Szeged railway line and railway lines to Szolnok, Kiskunhalas and Szentes also cross the town. The surrounding country is covered with vineyards, fruit gardens, and tobacco and corn fields.

== Name ==
Félegyháza means "half church" in Hungarian, while prefix Kiskun refers to the region Kiskunság ("Little Cumania").

== History ==
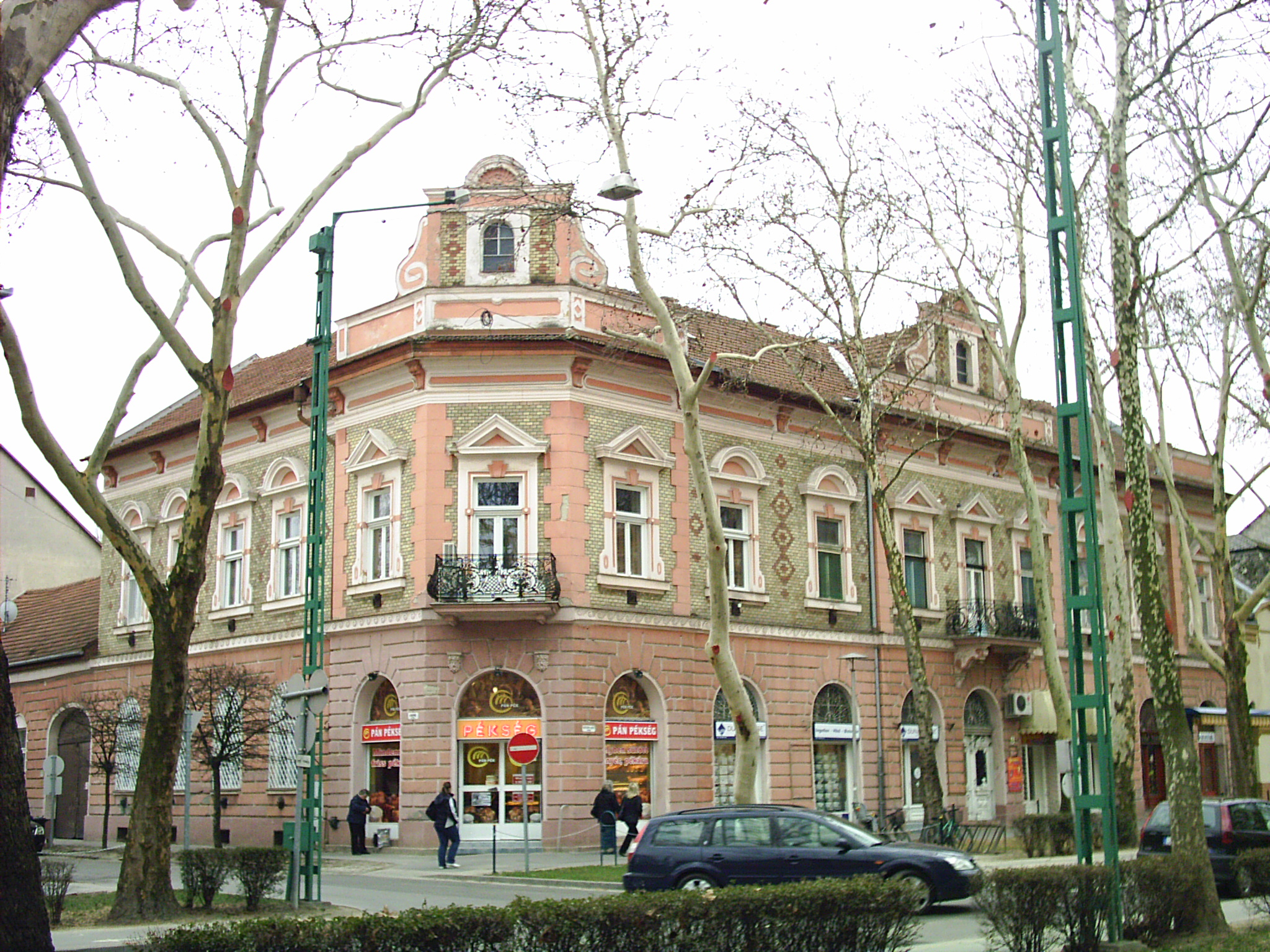
Eclectic apartment, built in 1899

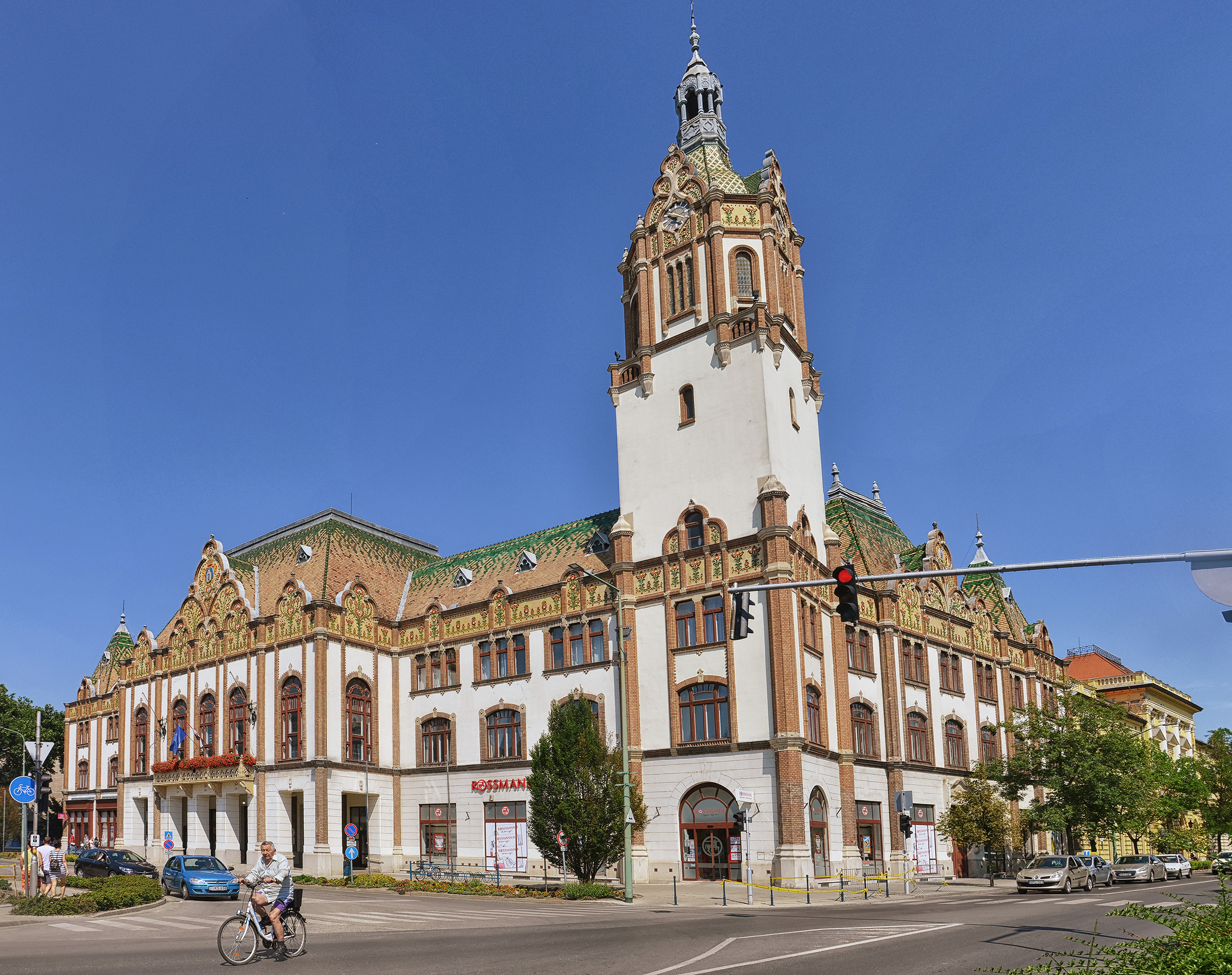
Town hall

Numerous Roman urns and other ancient relics have been dug up in the vicinity.

Conquering Hungarians arrived in the 9th century, adopted Christianity and settled down in the region by the 10th century. The first settlements devastated by the Mongols in 1241–42, the region became uninhabited. King Béla IV invited Cuman settlers, who also adopted Christianity, farming lifestyle and the Hungarian language. The town was existing in 1389 when a document mentions Feledház, an earlier name for the settlement. The town was ruined in 1526 by Ottoman troops and was uninhabited until the Christian troops liberated the area.

Kiskunfélegyháza was reestablished by Roman Catholic Hungarian settlers from Jászfényszaru and Üllés in 1743. Queen Maria Theresa moved the courts and prisons for the Kiskun district to Kiskunfélegyháza in 1753 and granted town privileges also in 1774.

== Notable people ==
- Ferenc Móra (1879–1934), novelist
- Béla Magyari (1949–2018), cosmonaut
- Sándor Petőfi (1823–1849), national poet
- László Réczi (1947), wrestler
- Csaba Szűcs (1965), athlete
- Gyula Zsivótzky (1937–2007), athlete
- Tamás Sulyok (1956), lawyer, President of Hungary

== In popular culture ==
- Kiskunfélegyháza is briefly mentioned in the 2025 videogame Kingdom Come: Deliverance 2

== Twin towns – sister cities ==
Kiskunfélegyháza is twinned with:

- Bagnols-sur-Cèze, France
- Braunfels, Germany
- Corund, Romania
- Die, France
- Feltre, Italy
- Jászfényszaru, Hungary
- Kikinda, Serbia
- Rabka-Zdrój, Poland
- Sighișoara, Romania
- Turda, Romania
- Uhrovec, Slovakia

== See also ==
- Bankfalu
