= 1990 Hungarian parliamentary election =

- 25 March 1990 (first round); 8 April 1990 (second round)

All 386 seats to the National Assembly 194 seats needed for a majority
- Turnout: 65.11% (first round); 45.54% (second round)
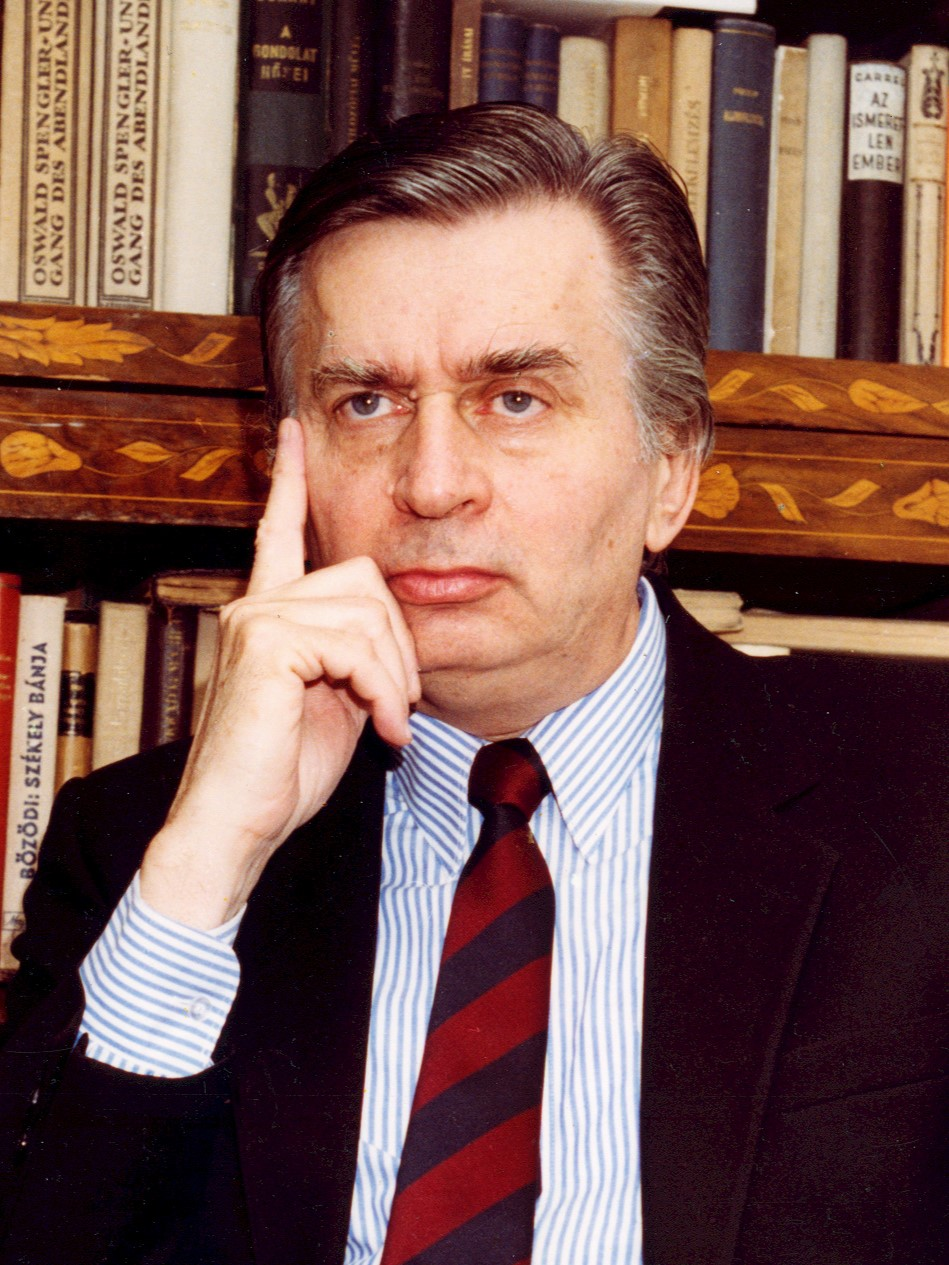

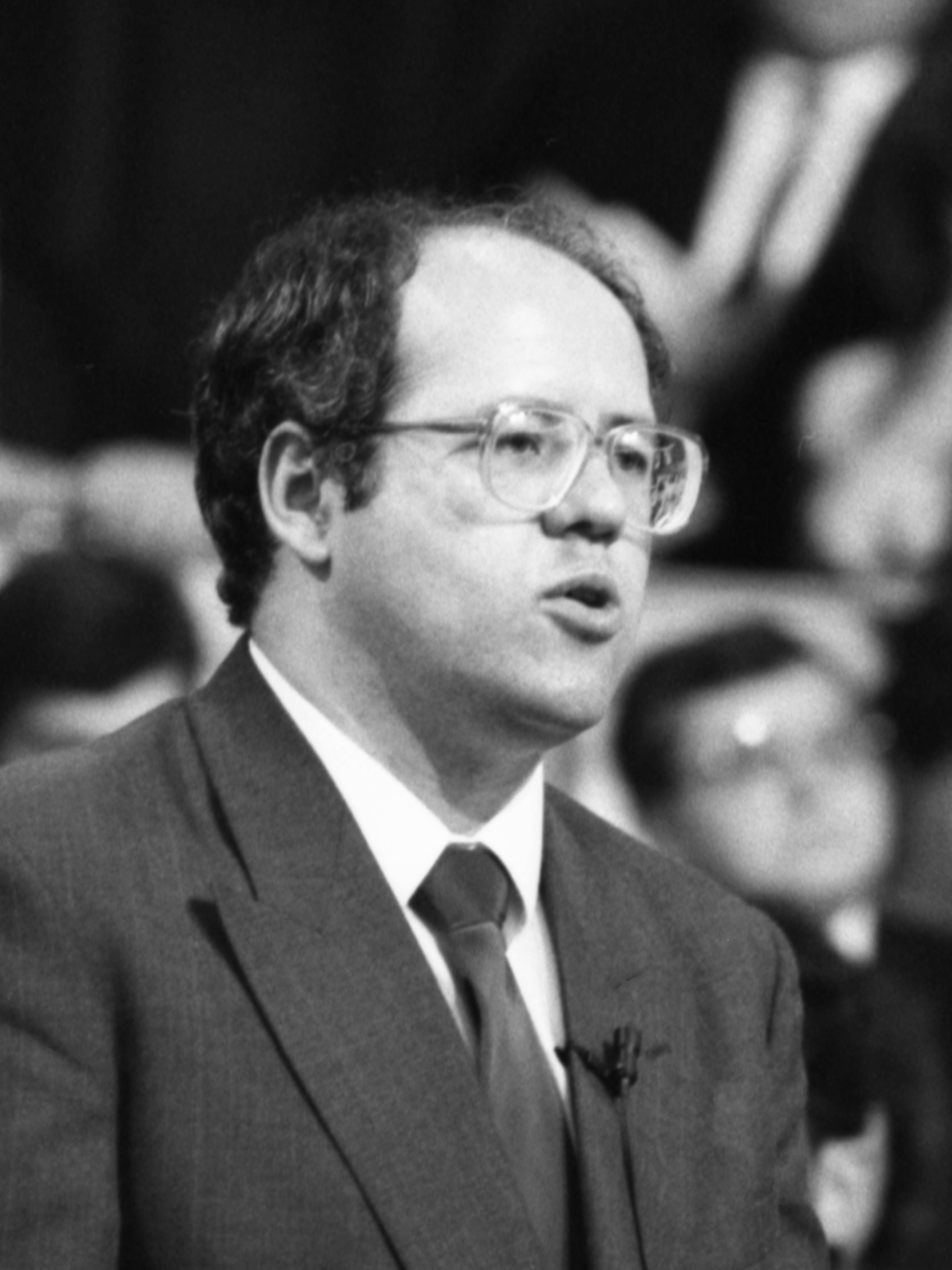

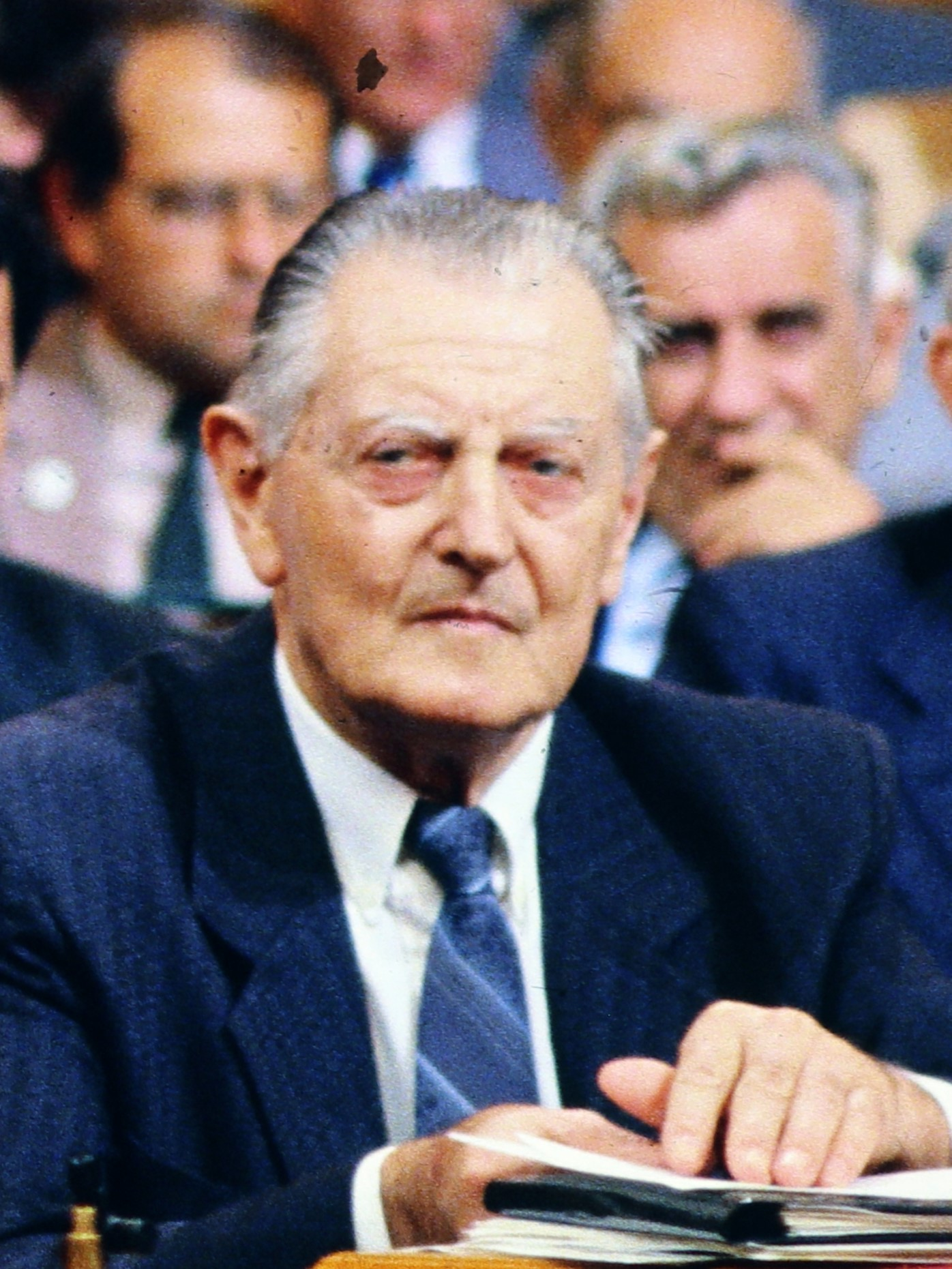

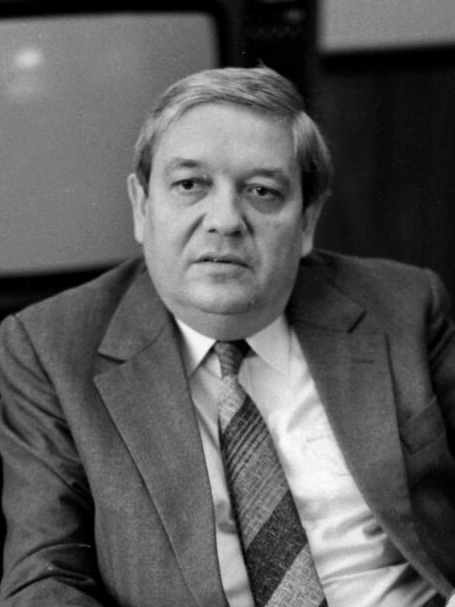

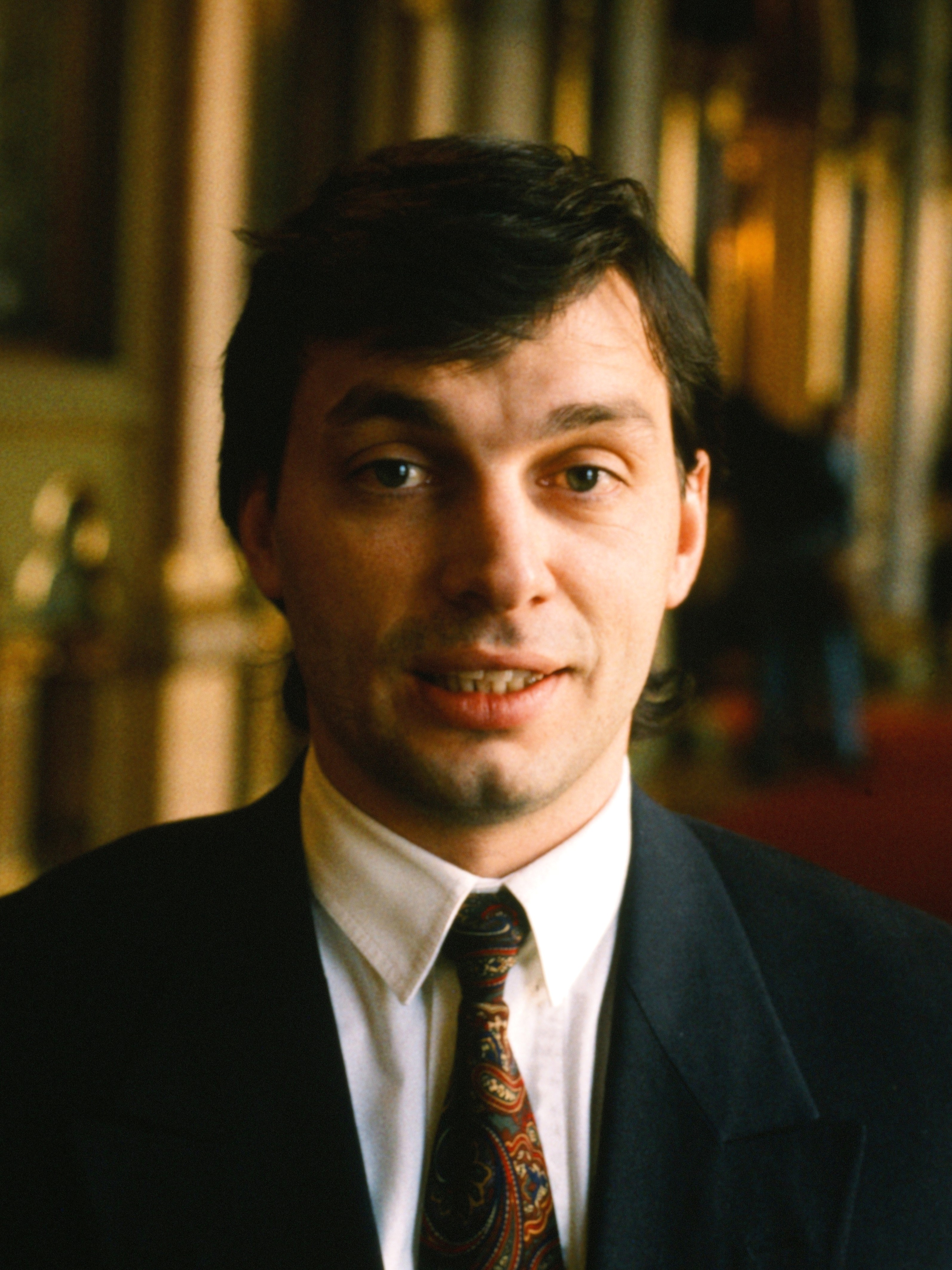

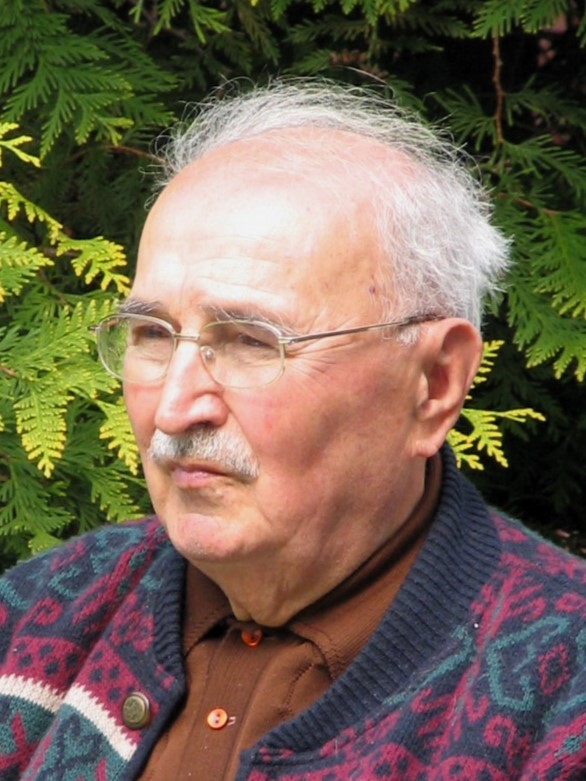
	First party	Second party	Third party
Leader	József Antall	Péter Tölgyessy	Vince Vörös
Party	MDF	SZDSZ	FKGP
Leader since	21 October 1989	(Note: Tölgyessy was lead candidate of SZDSZ, but was not party leader.)	23 March 1989
Seats won	164	94	44
Seat change	New party	New party (Note: Including one deputy elected as joint SZDSZ–Fidesz candidates and one deputy who elected as joint ASZ–SZFV candidate, but joined to the SZDSZ parliamentary group before the assembly session opened.)	New party
1R vote and %	1,186,668 (23.9%)	1,077,386 (21.7%)	529,270 (10.7%)
2R vote and %	1,406,276 (41.2%)	1,046,094 (30.7%)	355,112 (10.4%)
Party vote	1,214,359	1,050,799	576,315
%	24.73%	21.40%	11.73%
	Fourth party	Fifth party	Sixth party
Leader	Imre Pozsgay	Viktor Orbán	Sándor Keresztes
Party	MSZP	Fidesz	KDNP
Leader since	(Note: Pozsgay was lead candidate of MSZP, but was not party leader.)	(Note: Orbán was lead candidate of Fidesz, but was not party leader.)	30 September 1989
Seats won	33	22	21
Seat change	▼255 (Note: In the previous election the party started as MSZMP, they transformed to MSZP on 7 October 1989.)	New party (Note: Including one deputy elected as joint Fidesz–SZDSZ candidate.)	New party (Note: One deputy elected as a joint KDNP–Fidesz–SZDSZ candidate, but joined to the Independent parliamentary group before the assembly session opened.)
1R vote and %	504,909 (10.2%)	235,558 (4.8%)	287,578 (5.8%)
2R vote and %	216,561 (6.4%)	63,064 (1.9%)	127,938 (3.8%)
Party vote	535,064	439,649	317,278
%	10.89%	8.95%	6.46%
- Results of the election. Proportional list results are displayed in the top left.
Government before election
Németh Government (End of Communism)
MSZP
Government after election
Antall Government
MDF–FKGP–KDNP

Parliamentary elections were held in Hungary on 25 March 1990, with a second round of voting taking place in all but five single member constituencies on 8 April. They were the first completely free and competitive elections to be held in the country since 1945, and only the second completely free elections with universal suffrage in the country's history.

The conservative, nationalist Hungarian Democratic Forum beat the liberal and more internationalist Alliance of Free Democrats, which had spearheaded opposition to Communist rule in 1989, to become the largest party in parliament. The Hungarian Socialist Party, the former Communist party, suffered a crushing defeat, winning only 33 seats for fourth place.

MDF leader József Antall became prime minister in coalition with the Christian Democratic People's Party and Independent Smallholders' Party. It was the first government since the end of World War II with no Communist participation.

== Background ==
Hungary's transition to a Western-style democracy was one of the smoothest among the former Soviet bloc. By late 1988, activists within the party and bureaucracy and Budapest-based intellectuals were increasing pressure for change. Some of these became reformist social democrats, while others began movements which were to develop into parties. Young liberals formed the Federation of Young Democrats (Fidesz); a core from the so-called Democratic Opposition formed the Association of Free Democrats (SZDSZ), and the national opposition established the Hungarian Democratic Forum (MDF).

Among the organized opposition, Round Table Talks began in March 1989, a series of formalized, orderly and highly legalistic discussions, inspired by the Polish model. At that point, longtime leader János Kádár had been removed from power for almost a year, and the Communists' Central Committee that month admitted the necessity of a multiparty system, with various groups like Fidesz and the Alliance of Free Democrats (SZDSZ) having emerged. Mass demonstrations on March 15, the National Day, persuaded the regime to begin negotiations with the emergent non-Communist political forces. A week later, these new movements, at the initiative of the Independent Lawyers’ Forum, formed the Opposition Round Table (Ellenzéki Kerekasztal, EKA), designed to prevent the Communists from trying to maintain power by dividing the opposition, and to establish some degree of unity in the face of the regime's own reform agenda. The table was composed of a small number of elite organizations, whose grassroots links were poorly developed and whose very existence stemmed in part from the collaboration of key Communist reformers. Specifically, it involved the SZDSZ, Fidesz, the Hungarian Democratic Forum (MDF), the Independent Smallholders’ Party (FKGP), the Hungarian People's Party (MNP), the Endre Bajcsy-Zsilinszky Society, and the Democratic Trade Union of Scientific Workers. At a later stage the Democratic Confederation of Free Trade Unions and the Christian Democratic People's Party (KNDP) were invited.

In July 1989, four by-elections took place in Gödöllő, Szeged, Kecskemét and Kiskunfélegyháza to replace members like Antal Apró. In these elections SZDSZ, FKGP and Fidesz supported one single candidate from MDF in each constituency. In first three seats MDF candidates came first.

In October 1989, the ruling Communist Hungarian Socialist Workers' Party (MSZMP) convened its last congress and re-established itself as the Hungarian Socialist Party (MSZP), which branded itself as a Western European-style social democratic party. In a historic session from 16 October to 20 October, the parliament adopted legislation providing for multi-party parliamentary elections and a direct presidential election. The legislation changed Hungary's official name from the People's Republic of Hungary to the Republic of Hungary, guaranteed human and civil rights, and created an institutional structure that ensured separation of powers among the judicial, legislative, and executive branches of government.

An agreement was reached involving six draft laws that covered an overhaul of the Constitution, establishment of a Constitutional Court, the functioning and management of political parties, multiparty elections for National Assembly deputies, the penal code and the law on penal procedures (the last two changes represented an additional separation of the Party from the state apparatus).

The electoral system was a compromise: initially it proposed that 222 deputies would be elected proportionally and 152 deputies by the majoritarian system. Overall, National Assembly would have had 374 deputies, but it was agreed to have 386 deputies (down by one).

A weak presidency was also agreed upon, but no consensus was attained on who should elect the president (parliament or the people) and when this election should occur (before or after parliamentary elections). Initially, the opposition was united in wanting the president elected by parliament after new elections to ensure parliamentary supremacy and minimise the MSZMP's power. Then, faced with Communist concessions, the relatively weak opposition split, as at least three moderate groups (including KNDP and MDF) signed the Round Table agreement and implicitly accepted Pozsgay as president while the radicals (notably Fidesz and the SZDSZ) refused to do so. After a burst of negotiations, fully free elections were scheduled for March 1990, in contrast to the semi-free elections held in Poland in June 1989.

== Electoral system ==
Of the 386 seats in the National Assembly, 176 were elected from single member constituencies, 120 from multi-member constituencies and a further 90 from "compensatory" national seats.

== Results ==
Party	Proportional			SMCs (first round)			SMCs (second round)			Seats	
Party	Votes	%	Seats	Votes	%	Seats	Votes	%	Seats	National	Total
Hungarian Democratic Forum	1,214,359	24.73	40	1,186,668	23.93	3	1,406,276	41.24	111	10	164
Alliance of Free Democrats	1,050,799	21.40	34	1,077,386	21.73	0	1,046,094	30.68	35	23	92
Independent Smallholders' Party	576,315	11.73	16	529,270	10.67	0	355,112	10.41	11	17	44
Hungarian Socialist Party	535,064	10.89	14	504,909	10.18	0	216,561	6.35	1	18	33
Fidesz	439,649	8.95	8	235,558	4.75	0	63,064	1.85	1	12	21
Christian Democratic People's Party	317,278	6.46	8	287,578	5.80	0	127,938	3.75	3	10	21
Hungarian Socialist Workers' Party	180,964	3.68	0	131,422	2.65	0	8,640	0.25	0	0	0
Social Democratic Party of Hungary	174,434	3.55	0	104,010	2.10	0	922	0.03	0	0	0
Agrarian Alliance	154,004	3.14	0	139,240	2.81	0	21,923	0.64	1	0	1
Entrepreneurs' Party	92,689	1.89	0	83,376	1.68	0	5,292	0.16	0	0	0
Patriotic Electoral Coalition	91,922	1.87	0	156,899	3.16	0	27,789	0.82	0	0	0
Hungarian People's Party	37,047	0.75	0	38,647	0.78	0	1,157	0.03	0	0	0
Green Party of Hungary	17,951	0.37	0	19,434	0.39	0				0	0
National Smallholders' and Civic Party	9,944	0.20	0	12,366	0.25	0	734	0.02	0	0	0
Somogy County Christian Coalition	5,966	0.12	0	5,029	0.10	0				0	0
Hungarian Cooperative and Agrarian Party	4,945	0.10	0	5,882	0.12	0				0	0
Independent Hungarian Democratic Party	2,954	0.06	0	4,617	0.09	0	3,248	0.10	0	0	0
Freedom Party	2,814	0.06	0	4,342	0.09	0				0	0
Hungarian Independence Party	2,143	0.04	0	2,129	0.04	0				0	0
SZDSZ–Fidesz				29,113	0.59	0	29,017	0.85	2	0	2
ASZ–SZFV				12,958	0.26	0	15,394	0.45	1	0	1
ASZ–HVK				12,897	0.26	0				0	0
Independent Social Democratic Party				7,564	0.15	0	3,947	0.12	0	0	0
KDNP–Fidesz–SZDSZ				6,473	0.13	0	7,856	0.23	1	0	1
Tedisz–Fédisz				3,759	0.08	0	2,202	0.06	0	0	0
Alliance for the Village and Countryside				3,092	0.06	0				0	0
MSZP–ASZ				2,255	0.05	0				0	0
Holy Crown Society				1,906	0.04	0				0	0
Party of Generations, Party of Pensioners and Families				1,762	0.04	0				0	0
MSZP–HVK				1,589	0.03	0				0	0
Alliance for the Protection of Nature and Society				1,284	0.03	0	206	0.01	0	0	0
Hungarian Workers' Democratic Center Party				973	0.02	0				0	0
Party for Rural Hungary				690	0.01	0				0	0
Social Democratic Party of Hungarian Gypsies				613	0.01	0				0	0
People of the Orient Party – Christian Democrats				346	0.01	0				0	0
Independents				342,544	6.91	2	66,280	1.94	4	0	6
Total	4,911,241	100.00	120	4,958,580	100.00	5	3,409,652	100.00	171	90	386
Valid votes	4,911,241	96.43		4,958,580	97.83		3,409,652	98.55			
Invalid/blank votes	181,878	3.57		109,730	2.17		50,163	1.45			
Total votes	5,093,119	100.00		5,068,310	100.00		3,459,815	100.00			
Registered voters/turnout	7,824,110	65.10		7,798,018	64.99		7,603,095	45.51			
Source: CLEA, Nohlen & Stöver

=== Party list results by county ===
County	MDF	SZDSZ	FKGP	MSZP	Fidesz	KDNP	MSZMP	MSZDP	ASZ	VP	HVK	Others
Bács-Kiskun	23.23	19.87	19.17	7.89	7.36	4.66	2.80	3.33	4.82	4.34	1.34	1.18
Baranya	20.18	22.22	16.29	9.23	8.34	5.26	3.67	5.70	6.64	-	2.47	-
Békés	23.85	17.63	21.88	10.21	5.80	-	5.29	4.00	6.07	-	1.44	3.83
Borsod-Abaúj-Zemplén	23.55	15.92	9.92	14.14	8.22	9.32	4.49	3.57	3.92	2.09	1.47	3.38
Budapest	28.40	27.15	5.09	12.91	11.53	5.75	4.15	3.54	-	-	1.62	-
Csongrád	38.67	13.28	13.57	7.35	6.00	4.65	3.95	3.03	4.40	-	1.06	4.04
Fejér	24.32	25.09	12.46	10.01	8.53	-	3.56	4.90	3.53	3.54	3.14	0.92
Győr-Moson-Sopron	20.47	25.29	11.86	8.76	10.58	9.81	2.30	3.90	2.31	1.69	1.15	1.89
Hajdú-Bihar	21.76	19.78	17.01	14.10	6.67	-	3.33	3.64	6.45	2.99	2.80	1.47
Heves	23.09	19.80	7.54	10.25	7.99	13.34	6.10	4.72	-	-	2.63	4.53
Jász-Nagykun-Szolnok	21.32	16.46	17.70	11.42	8.40	-	5.38	4.88	5.49	3.61	2.95	2.39
Komárom-Esztergom	22.14	25.00	8.41	8.33	8.47	7.32	3.21	4.04	3.22	6.26	1.60	2.01
Nógrád	18.34	17.41	6.27	10.97	7.29	15.51	10.21	4.38	3.10	3.03	1.97	1.52
Pest	26.59	22.41	12.77	9.17	9.85	8.29	-	3.22	2.26	2.88	1.19	1.36
Somogy	16.38	15.72	18.95	18.00	7.68	-	3.13	3.35	4.73	2.76	1.54	7.75
Szabolcs-Szatmár-Bereg	22.49	14.77	14.52	10.76	8.47	9.63	5.18	-	5.60	5.34	1.88	1.36
Tolna	19.92	18.57	12.89	8.98	9.67	13.49	2.95	3.41	4.18	-	2.28	3.65
Vas	23.77	30.04	9.79	7.60	7.17	11.74	2.82	-	4.45	-	1.48	1.15
Veszprém	27.45	17.40	11.86	9.14	10.99	7.00	3.09	5.31	1.96	2.88	2.91	-
Zala	25.40	20.90	10.28	9.62	7.12	11.02	2.94	2.65	3.30	2.99	3.41	0.37
Total	24.73	21.40	11.73	10.89	8.95	6.46	3.68	3.55	3.14	1.89	1.87	1.71

== Sources ==
- Butler, David; Ranney, Austin (1994), Referendums Around the World: The Growing Use of Direct Democracy, American Enterprise Institute, ISBN 0-8447-3853-0.
- De Nevers, Renée (2003), Comrades No More: The Seeds of Change in Eastern Europe, MIT Press, ISBN 0-262-54129-7.
- Elster, Jon; Offe, Claus; Preuss, Ulrich K (1998), Institutional Design in Post-communist Societies, Cambridge University Press, ISBN 0-521-47931-2.
- Falk, Barbara J (2003), The Dilemmas of Dissidence in East-Central Europe, Central European University Press, ISBN 963-9241-39-3.
- Grzymała-Busse, Anna Maria (2002), Redeeming the Communist Past: The Regeneration of Communist Parties in East Central Europe, Cambridge University Press, ISBN 0-521-00146-3.
- Heenan, Patrick; Lamontagne, Monique (1999), The Central and Eastern Europe Handbook, Taylor & Francis, ISBN 1-57958-089-0
- Nohlen, Dieter; Stöver, Philip (2010). Elections in Europe: A data handbook. Nomos. ISBN 978-3-8329-5609-7.
