= Kisújszállás =

- Town
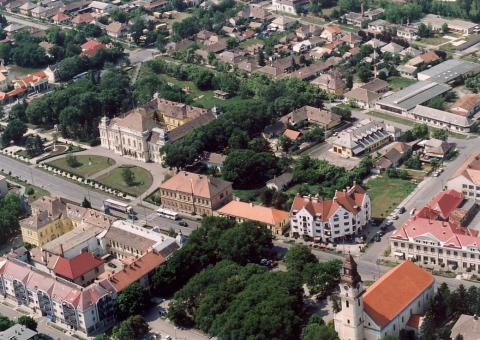
- College of Kisújszállás

- Flag Coat of arms

- Location within Hungary
- Coordinates: 47°13′01″N 20°46′01″E
- Country: Hungary
- County: Jász-Nagykun-Szolnok
- District: Karcag

Area
  - Total: 205.27 km^{2} (79.26 sq mi)

Population (2025)
  - Total: 9,635
  - Density: 54/km^{2} (140/sq mi)
- Time zone: UTC+1 (CET)
  - Summer (DST): UTC+2 (CEST)
- Postal code: 5310
- Area code: (+36) 59
- Website: www.kisujszallas.hu

Kisújszállás is a town in the Karcag District of Jász-Nagykun-Szolnok county. The name means: the word kis (small) refers to the relatively small size of the settlement, új (new) indicates repeated or renewed occupation, while the word szállás (lodging) refers to the villages of the Kuns and Jász people in the 14th and 15th centuries, which were less structured and had a different layout than those of the Hungarians.

== Location ==
Administratively, the town is in the Karcag District, geographically to the Szolnok–Túri plain micro-region, and culturally to the Nagykunság region. Its neighbors are Karcag to the northeast, Bucsa to the east, Ecsegfalva to the southeast, Túrkeve to the south, Kuncsorba to the southwest, Örményes to the west, and Kenderes to the northwest. Its administrative border also touches the southeastern border of Fegyvernek to the west and the southeastern border of Kunhegyes to the north.

== Approach ==
Its two most important roads are Main road 4 (Hungary), which runs through the town center, and the M4 motorway (Hungary), which bypasses it to the north and also has a rest area. Until the M4 motorway (Hungary) was opened, the northern bypass of the town was part of Main road 4 (Hungary) between 2011 and 2026. Among the surrounding settlements, it is connected to Túrkeve and Mezőtúr by road 4202, to Ecsegfalva, Dévaványa, and Körösladány by road 4205, and to Örményes by road 4207.

Among the domestic railway lines, the MÁV 100 (Budapest–)Budapest–Záhony railway passes through the town, and the 102 Kál-Kápolna–Kisújszállás railway line has its southern terminus here. The Kisújszállás–Dévaványa–Gyoma railway line started here, essentially as a continuation of the former line, but it was discontinued decades ago and its tracks were dismantled. Kisújszállás railway station is located between Fegyvernek-Örményes railway station and Karcag railway station in relation to the current stations on line 100, and after Kenderes railway station on line 102. Physically, it is located on the northern edge of the town center, and is accessible by road via the 34 303 side road branching off from the Main road 4 (Hungary). In addition to the station, the Turgony stop on line 100 and the Márialaka stop (and possibly the Mirhó stop) on the Gyoma line were also located in the Kisújszállás area, but none of these are in operation today.

== Politics ==
The current mayor of Kisújszállás is Szűcs Tamás (Fidesz-KDNP-Nagykun Civilian Circle).

The local Municipal Assembly, elected at the 2024 local government elections, is made up of 11 members (1 Mayor, 8 Individual constituencies MEPs and 3 Compensation List MEPs) divided into this political parties and alliances:

Party	Seats	Current Municipal Assembly
Fidesz-KDNP-Nagykun Civilian Circle	8	M
DK-MSZP-Jobbik	3	

== List of Kisújszállás Mayor's ==
Term	Mayor	Party
1990–1994:	Dr. Lajos Ducza	Unknown
1994–1998:	Dr. Lajos Ducza	Independent
1998–2002:	Gábor Palágyi	Independent
2002–2006:	Gábor Palágyi	MSZP
2006–2010:	István Kecze	Nagykun Civic Circle
2010–2014:	István Kecze	Fidesz–KDNP–Nagykun Civic Circle
2014–2019:	István Kecze	Fidesz–Nagykun Civic Circle
2019–2024:	István Kecze	Fidesz–KDNP–Nagykun Civic Circle
2024–:	Tamás Szűcs	Fidesz–KDNP–Nagykun Civic Circle

== History ==
Kisújszállás is one of the great Kun settlements, an ancient Kun settlement. Its area has been inhabited for 4–5,000 years. Archaeological excavations have uncovered Sarmatian pottery fragments on the outskirts of the town, dating from the 1st to 3rd centuries. There have been permanent settlements here since the Middle Ages, and twenty-two Árpád-era settlements have been discovered in the last fifty years. A small number of these settlements were winter lodgings, while 17–18 were villages that existed simultaneously at the end of the 11th century. The dense settlement network was destroyed during the Mongol invasion of 1241–42, when the First Mongol invasion of Hungary happened, it destroyed the villages along with the Árpád-era church. Between 1243 and 1246, the Cumans, the ancestors of today's inhabitants, settled in these places for the second time, as King Béla IV of Hungary invited them back in 1246 and settled them there, as they represented a significant military force. The marriage of the heir to the throne, Stephen V, and Princess Elizabeth of Cumania in 1247 sealed the alliance. The marriage of Crown Prince Stephen V and Princess Elizabeth of the Cumans in 1247 sealed the alliance. After that, Cuman soldiers were everywhere in the battles fought by the Hungarians for hegemony in Central Europe in Austria, Styria, Bohemia, and Moravia. In 1278, the Kun horsemen played a significant role in the Battle of Dürnkrut, where Ladislaus IV of Hungary (Kun) defeated King Ottokár of Bohemia alongside Rudolf of Habsburg. In 1470, King Matthias mentioned Kisújszállás by its present name in a deed of donation to the Kun Lőrinczi family. This royal deed of donation was confirmed in 1552 by Ferdinand I and later by Rudolf II, Holy Roman Emperor. During the first decades of Ottoman Hungary, Kisújszállás was the smallest village in Nagykunság. In 1557, approximately 120 people lived in this area. The village was first destroyed in 1594 during the Fifteen Years' War, but the population later returned. During the 17th century, the population fled and returned several times. The village was finally destroyed in 1683, following the military operations of the Turks and their Tatars allies in the Tiszántúl region.

After the Treaty of Karlowitz in 1699, which ended the war against the Turks, imperial census taker Jakab Petz arrived that same year to find only desolation and uninhabited places in Kisújszállás and the surrounding settlements. This is why Leopold I, Holy Roman Emperor of Hungary decided to sell Nagykunság, along with Jászság and Kiskunság, to the Teutonic Order for 500,000 forints on March 22, 1702. During the Rákóczi War of Independence, which broke out in 1703, the fugitive population was allowed to settle on Francis II Rákóczi's estate in Rakamaz, as ordered by the prince in his letter dated May 6, 1707.

The letter of patent for resettlement was sent for approval on August 17, 1717, by Captain General Orczy to Nyssa, Grand Master of the Teutonic Order, granting the settlers two years of tax exemption. After that, the population grew very quickly. In 1720, at the time of the first census, about 300 people lived in the village, which grew eightfold within 25 years, a trend that neither the great fire of 1724 nor the plague of 1739 could slow down. By the end of the 18th century, however, the population had grown so large that four settlements in the southern region of Bačka, now part of Serbia, were populated from here: the Hungarian populations of Bácsfeketehegy, Bácskossuthfalva, Pacsér, and Piros originated from Kisújszállás. The emigrants from Kisújszállás did not all leave the village together at the same time, but in groups at different times. The first group left the village on April 12, 1786.

The economic boom of Nagykunság and the restoration of independence were brought about by Maria Theresa's redemptio (redemption) charter in May 1745. Kisújszállás, as one of the six Nagykun towns (Karcag, Kunhegyes, Kunmadaras, Kunszentmárton, Túrkeve), has enjoyed the privileges sanctioned by the king since 1745, such as choosing its own chief judge, council, and officials, as well as being an independent economic entity.

Description of the settlement at the end of the 18th century: "A Hungarian town in Jász-Kun County, in the Nagykunság district, on the Pest-Debrecen road, 16 miles from Pest and 8 miles from Debrecen. It has 9,159 inhabitants, of whom 9,108 are Reformed, 11 are Catholic, and 40 are Old Believers. It has a large and dignified Reformed mother church and a good inn. The fields are rich black soil, which yields every kind of grain. The so-called Takács Greek melon is famous; From Kardszag (Karcag) lies the Kara János marsh. There are 202 craftsmen, 840 citizens, and 1593 houses here. The women raise a lot of poultry, which they trade in Pest." (András Vályi, Description of the Hungarian Country, 1796–1799)[5]

In 1806, King Francis I granted the settlement the status of a market town, with the right to hold fairs. Trade began to develop. Craftsmen's guilds were formed one after another. Sándor Gaál's small bundles gained fame throughout Europe. The practitioners of this craft, their living descendants today, are members of the Takács dynasty. Among our European treasures are the uniquely patterned, hand-embroidered shirts worn by shepherds.

The settlement played a significant role in the Hungarian Revolution of 1848. János Illéssy, captain of Nagykunság, was Lajos Kossuth's government commissioner and a member of the National Assembly sitting in Debrecen. The 12 points of the revolution were also accepted by the people of Nagykunság at a public meeting held in Kisújszállás on March 20, 1848, supplemented with their own demands: the removal of the leaders of the former Jászkun districts, the recall of the representatives to the National Assembly, the relocation of the district centers to Kisújszállás, the separation of the three districts, and the declaration of their independence. At Kossuth's suggestion, the National Assembly voted to raise an army of 200,000 and 50,000 recruits, which the city fulfilled according to its quota and even sent more recruits. The recruits from Kisújszállás were enlisted in the 2,500-strong national guard, which went to fight against the Serbs in a camp near Verbász. Recruitment took place several times in 1848, and the soldiers from Kisújszállás also fought against General Franz Schlik's army at Szikszó.

Another event took place in the town in 1848: Jews were allowed to settle there, and then Act XVII of 1867 declared the emancipation of the Jews.

In 1857, the railway between Szolnok and Karcag was built, connecting the developing town to the national transport network.

Until 1872, it was administered by an elected captain, but from then on, it became a town with an organized council and a population of 10,000.

The town's current image was formed around the turn of the millennium, with its characteristic thatched-roof peasant and farmhouses and farmsteads alongside Baroque and Classicist buildings.

To preserve the identity and folk traditions of the Nagykunság region, the town participates in the Nagykunság Cooperation Association, which has seven other members: Berekfürdő, Karcag, Kunmadaras, Kunhegyes, Kunszentmárton, Mesterszállás, and Túrkeve.

== Population ==
Similar to Karcag, the original population of Kisújszállás consisted of descendants of the Kun people (belonging to the Eastern Turkic-Kipchak language family) who had become Magyarized. The town's population peaked in the 1970s and 1980s. After the change of regime, it began to decline significantly.

During the 2011 census, 86.6% of residents identified themselves as Hungarian, 4.1% as Roma, 0.3% as German, and 0.2% as Romanian (13.3% did not respond; due to dual identities, the total may exceed 100%). The religious distribution was as follows: Roman Catholic 6%, Reformed 18.8%, non-denominational 49.4% (24.4% did not respond).

In 2022, 92.1% of the population identified as Hungarian, 2.5% as Roma, 0.2% as German, 0.1–0.1% as Bulgarian, Ruthenian, Ukrainian, and Romanian, and 2% as other non-domestic nationalities (7.8% did not respond; due to dual identities, the total may be greater than 100%). In terms of religion, 15.3% were Reformed, 4.8% Roman Catholic, 0.2% Greek Catholic, 0.1% Lutheran, 1.2% other Christian, 0.5% other Catholic, and 43.4% non-denominational (34.2% did not respond).

== Sights ==
Travelers on the Budapest–Debrecen railway line are greeted by the sight of a lowland settlement with outdoor gardening integrated into the landscape. Its structure is unique in this region, with an eccentric center and charming side streets and alleys. It is a market town with industry, commerce, and adequate services. Shops, restaurants, and guesthouses await travelers. The town's beach is located in the pleasant microclimate of the Erzsébet Liget oak forest, which covers several hectares, and offers a 48–49 °C thermal spring (alkaline hydrogen carbonate-iodine) with healing properties and camping facilities.

In addition to bathing, visitors can see the Papi Lajos Creative House (Nyár utca 8) and a collection of more than 2,000 items related to peasant farming and peasant life in the Ethnographic Exhibition Hall. In the nearly 200-year-old Country House, you can learn the craft of straw weaving, one of the folk art heritage and European values.

The Horváth Farm offers a pleasant respite, where you can learn about the ancient traditions of horse riding. More experienced riders can complete the "In the Footsteps of the Outlaws" tour and be inducted as honorary outlaws with a certificate. Every June, the town hosts the "Hétpróbás Kunokért" folk games competition, and in August, the Kisújszállás Days feature colorful folk dance, folk music, and folk art performances and fairs. In September, the Kun-viadal national horseback archery competition takes place, with the election of the Kun captain. The town offers good opportunities for excursions to the Hortobágy Puszta or Eger. To the south, the undisturbed bird life of the Hortobágy-Berettyó River and the bustard reserve attract visitors.

== Education institutions ==
=== Kindergartens and Nurseries ===
- Baptista Szeretetszolgálat Kisújszállási Óvodája
  - Pitypang Óvoda, Ifjúság útja 2.
  - Béla Király Úti Óvoda, Béla király út 67.
  - Petőfi Óvoda, Széchenyi utca 9.
  - Sásastó Úti Óvoda, Sásastó utca 5.
- Móricz Zsigmond Református Kollégium Kisharang Óvoda Tagintézménye, Vásár utca 24.

=== Primary Schools ===
- Arany János Általános Iskola Tagintézmény, Kálvin u. 3.
- Nagykun Baptista Oktatási Központ Kossuth Lajos Általános Iskola és Kollégium Tagintézménye
  - Rákóczi utca 1.
  - Deák Ferenc út 14.

=== Secondary Schools ===
- Móricz Zsigmond Református Kollégium, Gimnázium, Szakgimnázium és Általános Iskola, Széchenyi utca 4.
    - Széchenyi úti Kollégium (part of the main institution)
    - Dózsa György úti Kollégium (part of the main institution)
- Nagykun Baptista Oktatási Központ Illéssy Sándor Szakgimnázium és Szakközépiskola Tagintézménye, Arany János utca 1/a.
- Nagykun Baptista Oktatási Központ Kossuth Lajos Általános Iskola és Kollégium Tagintézménye (Gimnáziumi képzés), Kossuth utca 2.

=== Other Schools ===
- Jász-Nagykun-Szolnok Megyei Kádas György Óvoda, Általános Iskola, Szakiskola, Egységes Gyógypedagógiai Szakszolgálat, Diákotthon és Gyermekotthon, Bajcsy-Zs. u. 37.
- Baptista Alapfokú Művészeti Iskola, Rákóczi u. 3.

== Culture and Community Centers ==
=== Cultural Center ===
- Kisújszállás Cultural Center and Library

=== Libraries ===
- Arany János City Library
- Gallery Library

=== Cinema ===
- Vigadó Cultural Center

=== Media ===
- Kisúji Krónika

== Healthcare ==
Kisújszállás does not have a hospital or a large medical clinic. Basic and specialized healthcare services are provided through local clinics and practices:

- General Practitioner Services
- Pediatric Services
- Dental Services
- Nursing Services

=== Specialist Services ===
- Physiotherapy
- Internal Medicine
- Gynecology
- Occupational Health
- Ophthalmology
- Surgery
- Urology
- Dermatology
- Laboratory
- Balneotherapy

== Sports facilities ==
- Porcsalmi Lajos Sporttelep
- Extreme Sports Field
- Motocross Track

== Notable inhabitants ==
- Katalin Karikó, Hungarian-American Nobel Prize winner and inventor of the COVID mRNA vaccine
- Norbert Pardi, Hungarian biochemist specializing in mRNA-mediated mechanisms

== Twin towns – sister cities ==
Kisújszállás is twinned with:

- Eberschwang, Austria (1992)
- Pačir (Bačka Topola), Serbia (1996)
- Săcele, Romania (1999)
- Serne, Ukraine (2000)
- Spišská Nová Ves, Slovakia (1998)
- Wilamowice, Poland (2004)
