= Pardi (disambiguation) =

Pardi is a town in the Indian state of Gujarat.

Pardi may also refer to:

- Pardi, Bhopal, a village in Madhya Pradesh, India
- Pardi, Dahanu, a village in Maharashtra, India
- Pardi, Iran, a village in Iran
- Pardi, Azerbaijan, a village in Azerbaijan
- Jon Pardi, American country music singer
- Leo Pardi (1915–1990), Italian zoologist
- Norbert Pardi (* 1981), Hungarian biochemist researcher
- Pardison Fontaine (born 1989), American rapper also known as Pardi
- Angelo Pardi, a fictional character in the novels of Jean Giono

== See also ==
- Pardy
