= Kétpó =

- Village
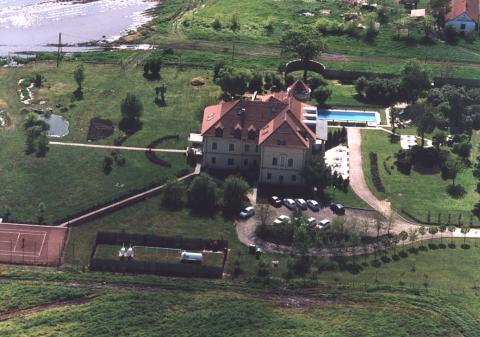
- Aerial photo of Kétpó.

- Coat of arms

- Location within Hungary
- Coordinates: 47°04′26″N 20°28′52″E
- Country: Hungary
- County: Jász-Nagykun-Szolnok
- District: Mezőtúr

Government
  - Mayor: Virágné Lukács Gabriella (Ind.)

Area
  - Total: 66.76 km^{2} (25.78 sq mi)

Population (2022)
  - Total: 554
  - Density: 8.30/km^{2} (21.5/sq mi)
- Time zone: UTC+1 (CET)
  - Summer (DST): UTC+2 (CEST)
- Postal code: 5411
- Area code(s): (+36) 56

Kétpó is a village in Mezőtúr District of Jász-Nagykun-Szolnok County, in the Northern Great Plain region of central Hungary.

== Geography ==
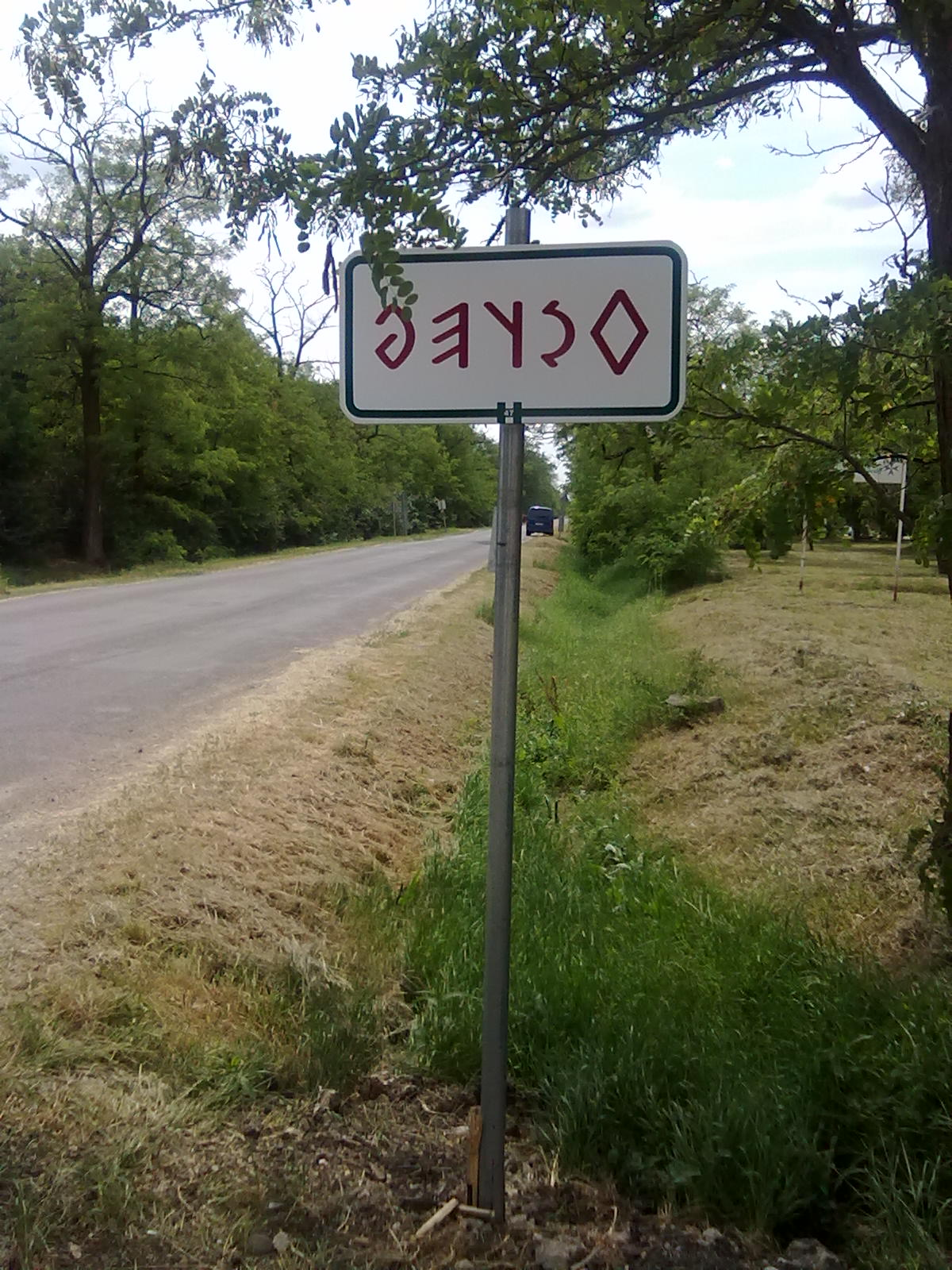
Kétpó town limit sign in Rovas script.

Kétpó covers an area of 66.76 km^{2} (26 sq mi) and has a population of 554 people (2022). Kétpó is situated in the south-eastern part of Jász-Nagykun-Szolnok county near the villages of Túrkeve, Mezőtúr, Törökszentmiklós, Kengyel, Mezőhék, Tiszatenyő, and Kuncsorba. There are no natural streams. One of the branches of the Nagykunság Main Channel is located at the border.

== History ==
=== Prehistory and ancient history ===
Palaeolithic man lived in the area, as found in excavations from Kengyel, Túrkeve, and Törökszentmiklós. In ancient times, the settlement was a marginal part of the Sarmatians, as their line of defense is the forefront of the Csörsz trench. By indirect evidence, it is likely that the region played an important role in Attila's era, when it was a connection between the central campsite along the Tisza (perhaps the area of Szeged) and the eastern parts of the empire, as it was possible to turn to the passes of the uncharted Tisza to the northeast of the Carpathian Mountains for the first time.

=== Age of Conquest ===
Many archaeological finds were found in Kétpó, probably Hungarians belonging to the Tarján tribe led by Ond. The mass of the artifacts and the names of the settlements that existed and still exist in the area (Kispó, Nagypó, Pusztapó, Póhamara, Póhalma) indicate that the vicinity of the settlement was an important neighborhood. There are a good number of Cumanian names (Kuns, Besenyi, Ulysses) among the people of the area and there are signs of their lives in the surrounding settlements. The area was barely suitable for farming due to its marshy nature, so it is likely that livestock and fishing were the primary products. And at a given time, these conditions are for the Bengal peoples. An outstanding archaeological find from this time is the Kétpó Cup, which proves that there was a prestigious headquarters in this place at the time of the conquest.

=== Árpád Age ===
The tribal center was soon established as a settlement, first mentioned in the Váradi Regestrum between 1208 and 1235. This is one of the oldest settlements in the county. The Tatar invasion depopulated this area. In 1240–42, Béla with the introduction of the Kuns. At that time, the Kétpó area was one of the southernmost points of the Kun (apart from Kunszentmárton), which will play a role in the later religious system.

At the turn of the 15th century, Sigismund of Luxembourg was fighting against the Turks for Belgrade, so he exchanged it, among others, in the head of the Twin Pole. The master of the estate became György Brankovics, a descendant of the Rascian despot, who had settled a large number of Serbian families in the area. At this time, two settlements have been registered under the name Kispó and Nagypó. With their introduction, farming became more dominant in the area.

=== Turkish times ===
The area of Kispó and Nagypó was subject to the castle of Törökszentmiklós, and it was noted that both villages had a church and about 200 to 300 inhabitants. The continual harassment of the Turks and the war with the Tatar troops depopulated the country, which was almost completed by the fifteen-year war between 1591 and 1606. The population started to return only after the peace-making, but the area of the settlements was recorded as a desert. Further losses were caused by the relocation of a significant part of the loyal population to Rakamaz after the failure of the Rákóczi's War of Independence.

=== Desert period ===
In the XVII-XIX centuries, the area of Kétpó was registered as a wilderness attached to Mezőtúr.

== Modern development ==
Kétpó has been first mentioned in 1728 as two distinct cadastral properties, Kispó and Nagypó. The name Kétpó itself means Two Pós in Hungarian. The soil in the area was though as rich, as it gave a fivefold yield instead of a threefold one considered average in the region. The pastures were capable of supporting 400 heads of cattle, but for the lack of water they must been driven to remote watering holes.

The lands or Kétpó were mostly used for extersive animal husbandry. Despite the richness of land soil, due to the aridity of the area it took time, until cultivation reappeared at this fairly distant place from the local center of Mezőtúr.

Most of the new inhabitants were sharecroppers, cottars and agricultural labourers, who didn't hold any title to the land they worked on. Population settled in a dispersed pattern, one or some families at most building a homestead. Some consolidation took place at the end of the 19th century when most current outer settlements of Kétpó, amongst them Csali, Csikós-tanya, Keserű falu, Cukorgyár, Mészéros, Dérczi-tanya, Demepó, Csugarpart have been established.

Kétpó itself was founded during the Communist Rule in 1952 when some 1400 persons from the 4000 total have been moved into the newly created village center. Roads, utilities, a community center and shops have been built and a local medical practice has been established. Between 1945 and 1960 128 new detached homes were risen.

== Religion ==
In terms of religion, Kétpó was similar to the other settlements of the Nagykunság, where Roman Catholicism was weakly rooted, Eastern Christianity was more typical, and South Slavic settlement was further strengthened. This resulted in the rejection of Catholicism in the Reformation era and the rapid spread of the Reformed Faith.

In 2022, 48% said they were irreligious, 17% said they were Calvinist, and 5.4% said they were Roman Catholic.

== Demographics ==
In 2022, almost 94% of the population of the settlement declared themselves to be of Hungarian nationality.
