= Margit Sebők =

Hungarian painter and educator (1939–2000)

- Sebők in 1981.
- Born: December 9, 1939; Karcag, Hungary
- Died: October 18, 2000 (aged 60)
- Education: Eszterházy College
- Spouse: József Pogány

Margit Sebők (December 9, 1939 – October 18, 2000) was a Hungarian painter and educator.

She was born in Karcag, Jász-Nagykun-Szolnok county, Hungary. She spent her childhood in Berekfürdő. She finished high school in Karcag then in 1961 received a degree from the Eszterházy College in Eger, as a teacher of arts and geography. She worked as a teacher until 1988, then she was employed by the hu:Vasarely Museum

She was married to painter and teacher József Pogány (1938–2001), and had a son, sculptor Gábor Benő Pogány. A gallery in Berekfürdő was named after her in 2004.
