= Karcag District =

Coordinates: 47.3000°N 20.8500°E

Karcag District Karcagi járás
- Districts of Hungary
- Coat of arms

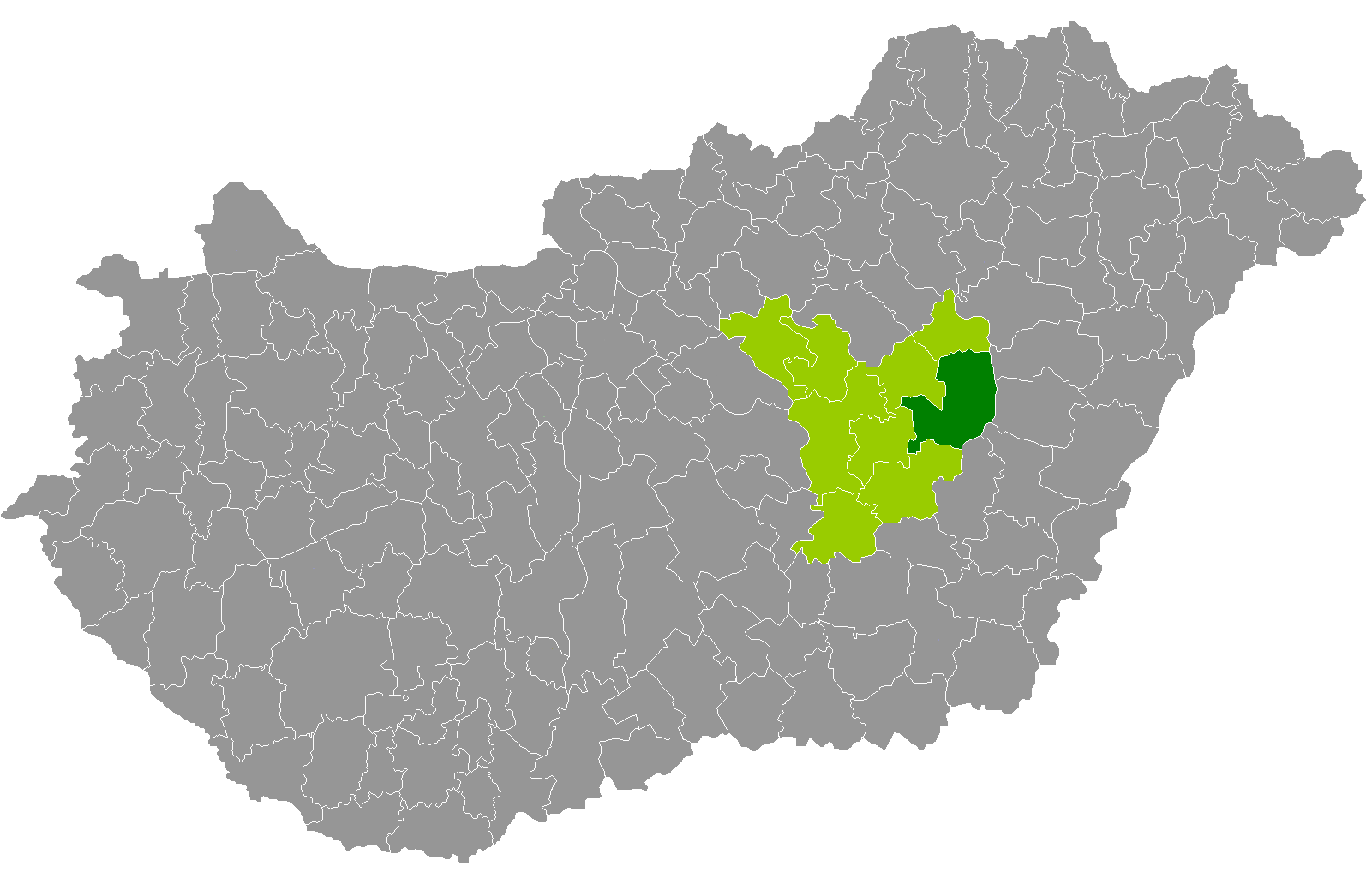
- Karcag District within Hungary and Jász-Nagykun-Szolnok County.
- Country: Hungary
- County: Jász-Nagykun-Szolnok
- District seat: Karcag

Area
  - Total: 857.26 km^{2} (330.99 sq mi)
  - Rank: 2nd in Jász-Nagykun-Szolnok

Population (2011 census)
  - Total: 43,226
  - Rank: 3rd in Jász-Nagykun-Szolnok
  - Density: 50/km^{2} (130/sq mi)

Karcag (Hungarian: Karcagi járás) is a district in eastern part of Jász-Nagykun-Szolnok County, Hungary. Karcag is also the name of the town where the district seat is found. The district is located in the Northern Great Plain Statistical Region. This district is a part of Nagykunság historical and geographical region.

== Geography ==
Karcag District borders with Püspökladány District (Hajdú-Bihar County) to the east, Szeghalom District and Gyomaendrőd District (Békés County) to the southeast, Mezőtúr District to the south, Törökszentmiklós District and Kunhegyes District to the west. The number of the inhabited places in Karcag District is 5.

== History ==
The Karcag District is one of the newly created districts in 2013 and did not exist before the closure of the districts in 1983. Karcag had never been a district seat before, but as a city it had never belonged to any district, and since its creation in 1994 it has been a Karcag Subregion seat.

== Municipalities ==
The district has 3 towns, 1 large village and 1 village. (ordered by population, as of 1 January 2012)

- Berekfürdő (1,010)
- **Karcag** (19,980) – district seat
- **Kenderes** (4,647)
- **Kisújszállás** (11,367)
- Kunmadaras (5,295)

The bolded municipalities are cities, italics municipality is large village.

== Demographics ==
Religion in Karcag District (2011 census)
1. Calvinism (23.1%)
2. Lutheranism (0.10%)
3. Catholic Church (13.5%)
4. Greek Catholicism (0.20%)
5. Other religions (1.30%)
6. Non-religious (37.4%)
7. Atheists (1.20%)
8. Undeclared (23.2%)

In 2011, it had a population of 43,226 and the population density was 50/km².

Year	County population	Change
2011	43,226	n/a

=== Ethnicity ===
Besides the Hungarian majority, the main minorities are the Roma (approx. 3,500) and German (100).

Total population (2011 census): 43,226
Ethnic groups (2011 census): Identified themselves: 41,613 persons:

- Hungarians: 37,755 (90.73%)
- Gypsies: 3,421 (8.22%)
- Others and indefinable: 437 (1.05%)

Approx. 1,500 persons in Karcag District did not declare their ethnic group at the 2011 census.

=== Religion ===
Religious adherence in the county according to 2011 census:

- Reformed – 9,969;
- Catholic – 5,894 (Roman Catholic – 5,816; Greek Catholic – 78);
- Evangelical – 48;
- other religions – 563;
- Non-religious – 16,198;
- Atheism – 535;
- Undeclared – 10,019.

== Transport ==
=== Road network ===
- Main road (W→E): Budapest... – **Karcag District** (3 municipalities: Kenderes, Kisújszállás, Karcag) – ...Záhony
- Main road (N→S): Tiszafüred... – **Karcag District** (1 municipality: Kunmadaras) – ...Fegyvernek

=== Railway network ===
- Line 100 (W→E): Budapest... – **Karcag District** (3 municipalities: Kenderes, Kisújszállás, Karcag) – ...Záhony
- Line 103 (S→N): **Karcag District** (3 municipalities: Karcag, Berekfürdő, Kunmadaras) – ...Tiszafüred (108)

== Gallery ==
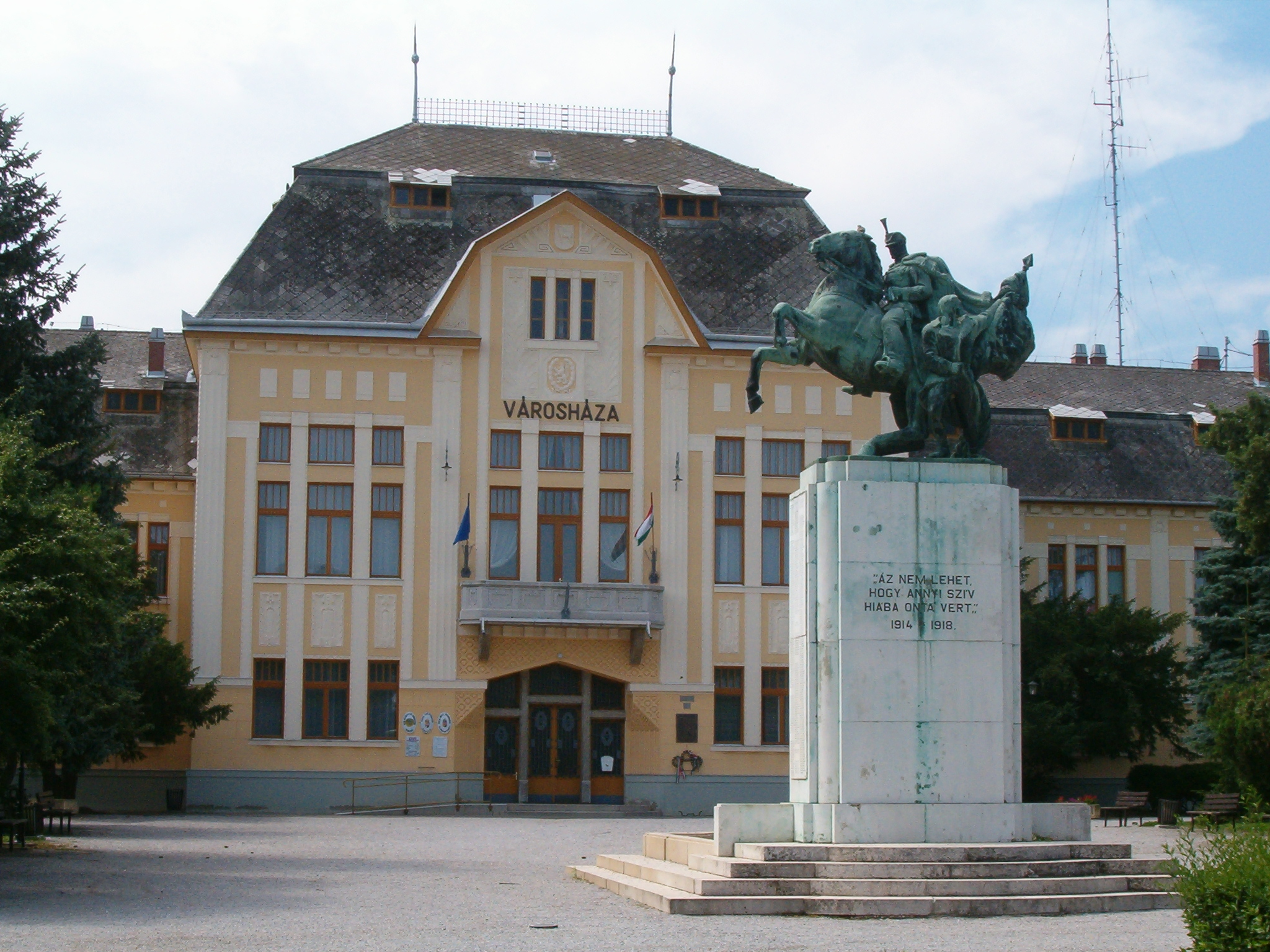
Karcag, Town Hall

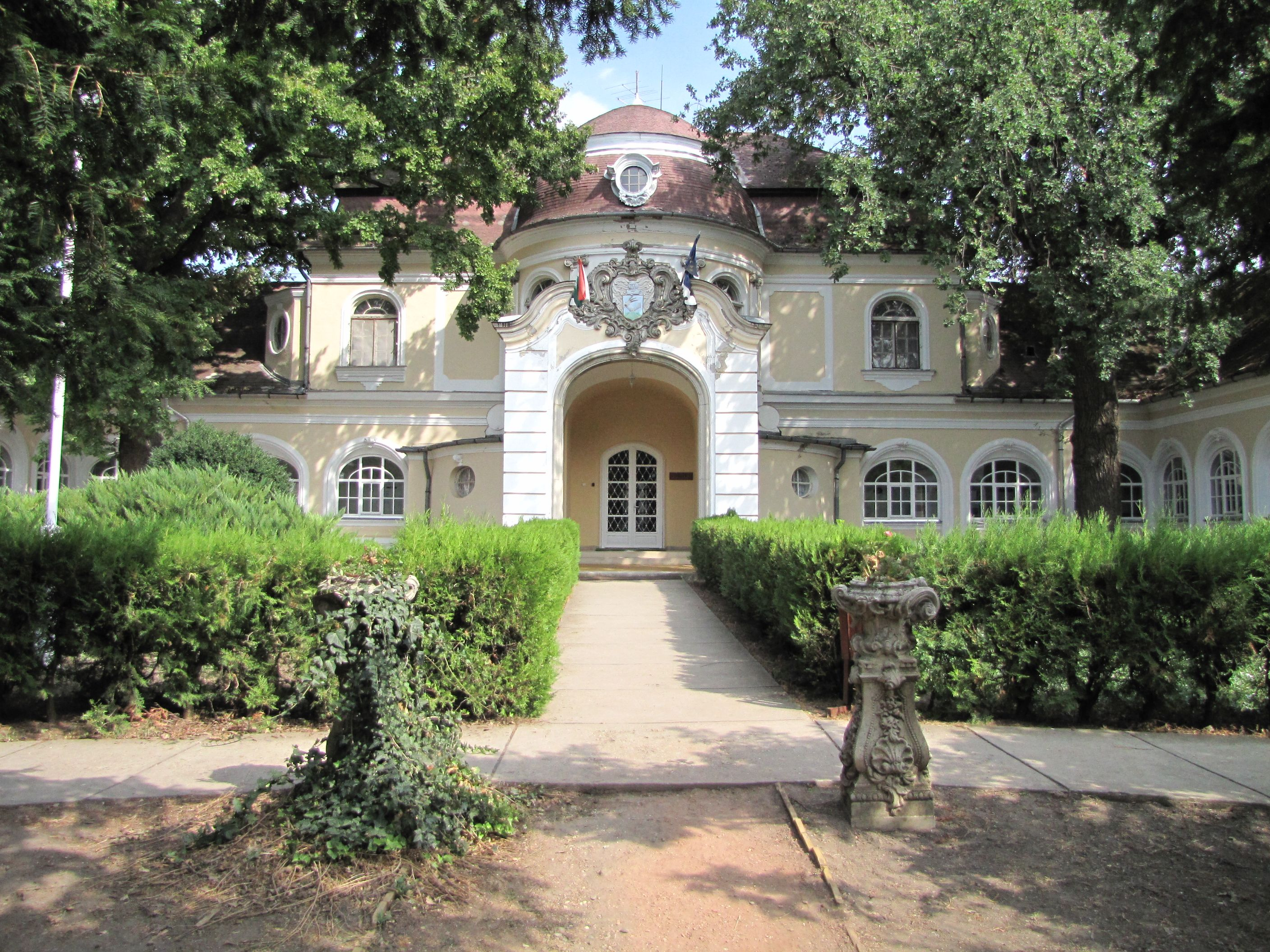
Horthy Mansion in Kenderes

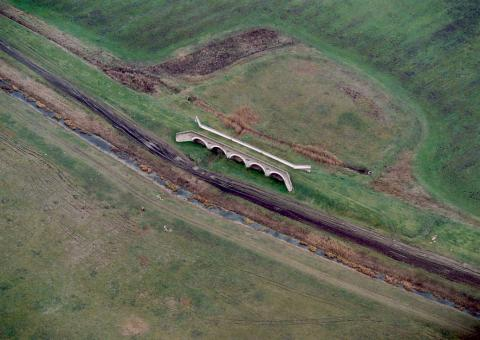
Zádor Bridge near Karcag

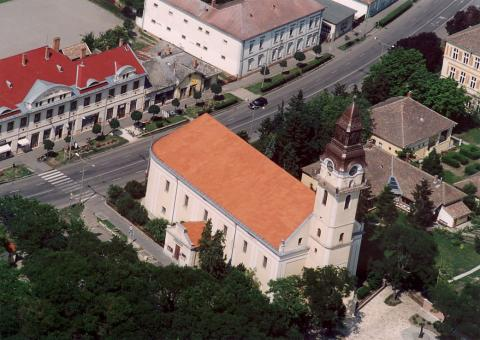
Reformed Church in Kisújszállás

== See also ==
- List of cities and towns of Hungary
