= Eszterházy Károly Catholic University =

University in Eger, Hungary

Coordinates: 47.89999072948177°N 20.375337556642602°E

- Eszterházy Károly Katolikus Egyetem
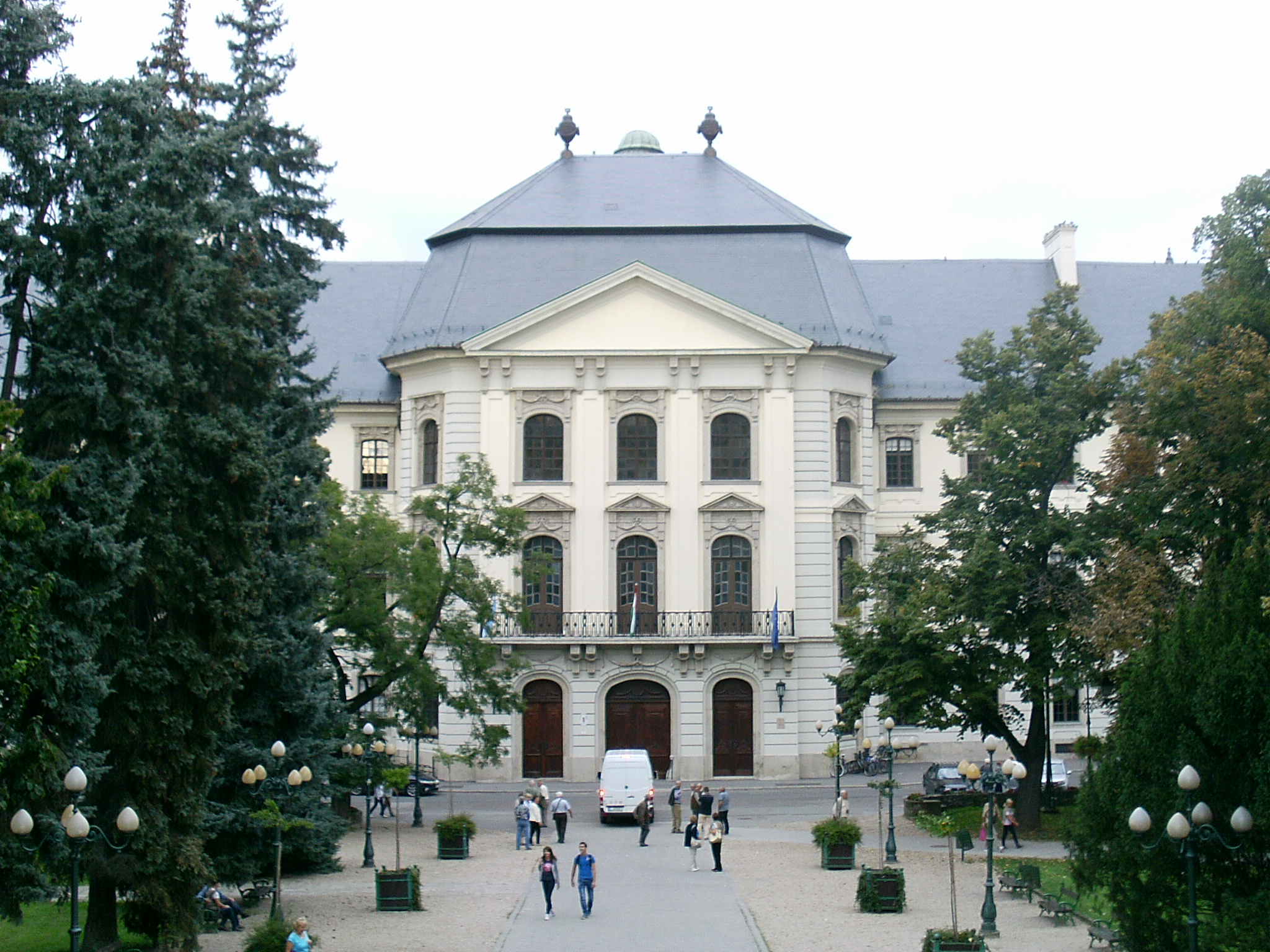
- Type: Private (Catholic)
- Established: 1774
- Rector: Dr. Liptai, Kálmán Csaba
- Students: 8,602
- Location: Eger, Hungary, EU
- Website: http://uni-eger.hu/

University rankings

Regional – Overall
- QS Emerging Europe and Central Asia: 301-350 (2022)

The Eszterházy Károly Catholic University was founded in 1774 in Eger. In 1989 it was renamed after its founder Bishop Károly Eszterházy. As of 1 August 2021, the Roman Catholic Archdiocese of Eger became the owner of university. Number of students is 8,602.

The establishment's buildings are scattered through the city, the largest and oldest among them was built in baroque style lyceum ("A" building).

Previous names: Lyceum, Teacher Training College (1828–), College of Education(in the Lyceum), from 1962 Teacher Training College of Eger, from 1969 Ho Si Minh Teacher Training College, from 1990 Eszterházy Károly Teacher Training College, from January 1. 2000 Eszterházy Károly College (-2016-06-30), Eszterházy Károly University of Applied Sciences.

== History ==
Ferenc Baróczky decided in 1761, that his seminary in Eger will be developed into a similar university as the University of Nagyszombat established by Péter Pázmány which is a three faculty (theology, liberal arts, law) university. The blueprints of the building were made by Josef Ignaz Gerl (1734–1798).

His successor Károly Eszterházy, added a medical faculty to this concept, the building was supposed to be the first 4 faculty university in Hungary. To found the university the permission of Maria Theresa was required, though she rejected it because of the negative responses from his predecessor Ferenc Baróczky. In hope of success Eszterházy continued the building according to the original plans, and in 1769 the fourth faculty was established and it was the first medical studies institution in Hungary. Even though Maria Theresa made the University of Nagyszombat into the base of medical studies (the city didn't even have a hospital to begin with, and in Eger the hospital was directed by Ferenc Markhot), the Scola Medicianis of Eger's right to doctoral degree was revoked, which caused the closure of the institution in 1775.

In 1774 teaching resumed in the new building. However, in 1777 Ratio Educationis put the establishment in a difficult situation: Maria Theresa moved the University of Nagyszombat to Buda, and declared that there can be only one university in Hungary. From this point on the institution was called a lyceum.

Philosophy and law education was discontinued in 1784 and seminary was moved to Pest in 1786. However, Eszterhazy never gave up on his plans. After the death of Joseph II, in 1790 philosophy was reinstated, along with law and seminary. In 1828 archbishop Johann Ladislaus Pyrker established the first Hungarian teacher education. Later, in 1852 it was moved to the Lyceum and continued until 1948. From 1921 on the initiative of Archbishop Louis Szmrecsányi Roman Catholic Boys Higher Commercial School also functioned in the building.

The college of education has moved to the Lyceum in 1949, when the institution, founded by the Hungarian Parliament in 1948, has moved from Debrecen to Eger. The college's philosophy was based on the academic tradition and ideals of renowned founder professors who valued spiritual guidance, openness to the future, and created a high-quality establishment.

The teacher training college became a national college-level teacher training institutions in half a century. Teacher training programs took on almost every versions and also launched some of the first multi-disciplinary program for the national teacher training. During its operation more than thirty thousand college-educated professionals were trained for the Hungarian education and society. Students enrol from all counties in the country and also from abroad.

== Faculties of the College ==
=== Faculty of Humanities ===
==== Institute of Linguistic and Literary Studies ====
- Department of Applied Communication Science
- Department of General Applied Linguistics
- Department of Hungarian Literature

==== Institute of History ====
- Department of Hungarian History: Medieval and Modern Period
- Department of Hungarian History: Modern Period
- Department of World History: Ancient and Medieval Period
- Department of Auxiliary Historical Sciences
- Department of World History: Modern and Current Period

==== Independent Departments ====
- Department of American Studies
- Department of British Studies
- Department of Music
- Department of Philosophy
- Department of French Language and Literature
- Department of German Language and Literature
- Department of Visual Arts

=== Faculty of Teacher Training and Knowledge Technology ===
==== Institute of Media Informatics ====
- Department of Informatics
- Department of Motion Picture Culture
- Department of Instruction and Communication Technology

==== Independent Departments ====
- Department of Andragogy and General Culture
- Department of Ethnic and Minority Studies
- Department of Pedagogy
- Department of Psychology
- Department of Social Pedagogy

==== Service providing organisational units ====
- Foreign Language Unit
- Lyceum TV

=== Faculty of Economics and Social Sciences ===
==== Institute of Economic Sciences ====
- Department of Economics and Business Law
- Department of Business Administration
- Department of Tourism
- Specialised Foreign Language Unit

==== Independent Departments ====
- Department of Communication and Media Science
- Department of Political Science

=== Faculty of Natural Sciences ===
==== Institute of Mathematics and Informatics ====
- Department of Applied Mathematics
- Department of Information Technology
- Department of Mathematics
- Department of Computer Science

==== Biology Institute ====
- Department of Zoology
- Department of Plant Physiology
- Department of Environmental Science

==== Institute of Food Science ====
- Department of Food and Wine Chemistry
- Department of Chemistry, Viticulture Chemistry, and Viticulture
- Department of Microbiology and Food Technology

==== Physical Education and Sports Science Institute ====
- Department of Sports Activities
- Department of Sport Science and Methodology
- Department of Body Culture Theory

==== Service providing organisational units ====
- Foreign Language Unit
- Natural Science Career Orientation and Methodological Centre (Magic Tower)

== Notable students ==
- Margit Sebők (1939–2000), Hungarian painter and educator
- Géza Gárdonyi, writer
- Tamás Cseh, musician
- Barbara Illés-Bódi

== See also ==
- Open access in Hungary
