= Mezőhék =

- Village
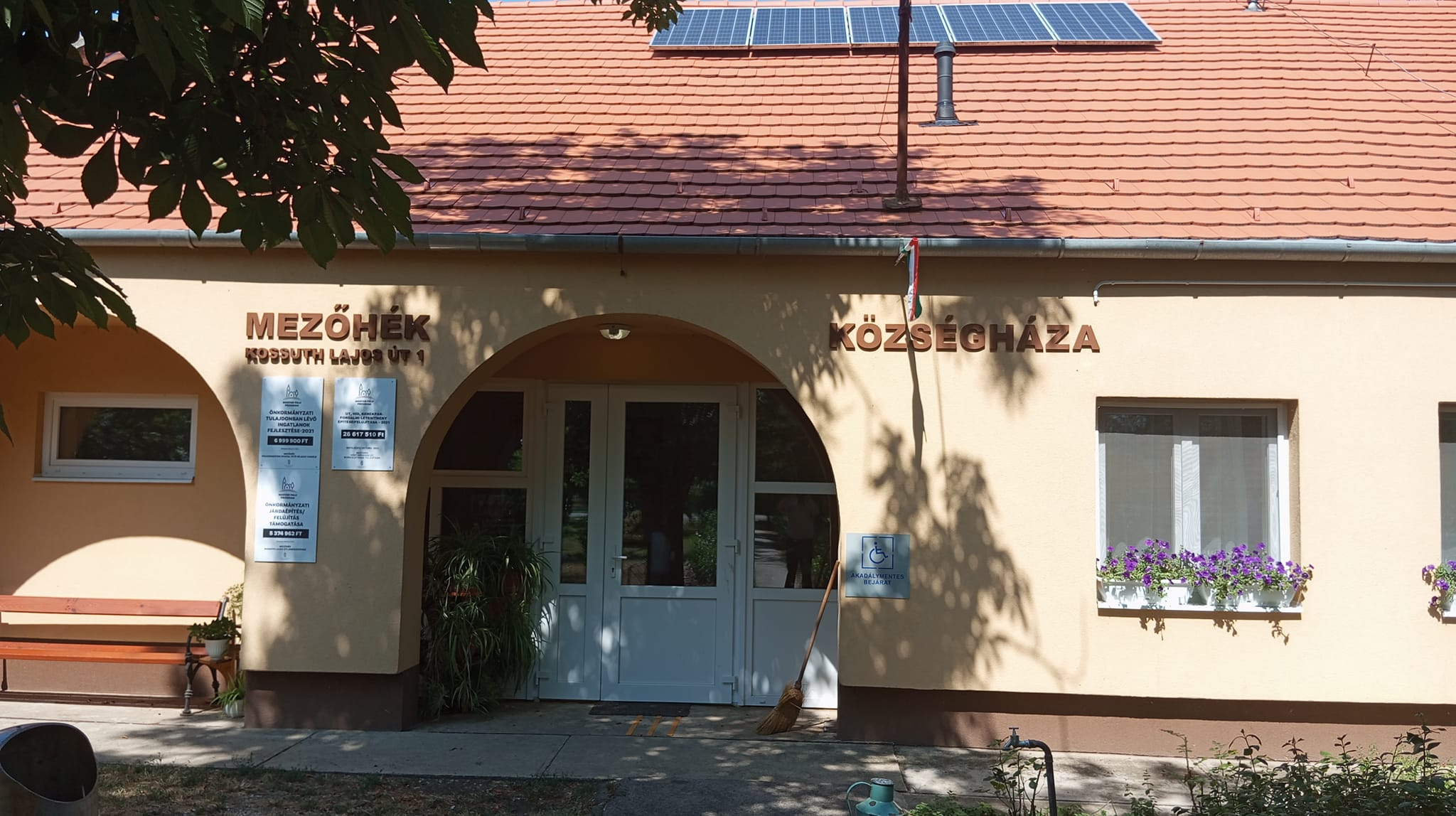
- Village hall

- Coat of arms

- Location within Hungary
- Coordinates: 46°59′38″N 20°23′16″E
- Country: Hungary
- County: Jász-Nagykun-Szolnok
- District: Mezőtúr

Area
  - Total: 89.82 km^{2} (34.68 sq mi)

Population (2015)
  - Total: 355
  - Density: 4/km^{2} (10/sq mi)
- Time zone: UTC+1 (CET)
  - Summer (DST): UTC+2 (CEST)
- Postal code: 5453
- Area code(s): (+36) 56

Mezőhék is a village in Jász-Nagykun-Szolnok county, in the Northern Great Plain region of central Hungary.

== Geography ==
It covers an area of 89.82 km^{2} (35 sq mi) and has a population of 355 people (2015).
