= Mezőtúr District =

Coordinates: 47.0333°N 20.5833°E

Mezőtúr District Mezőtúri járás
- Districts of Hungary
- Coat of arms

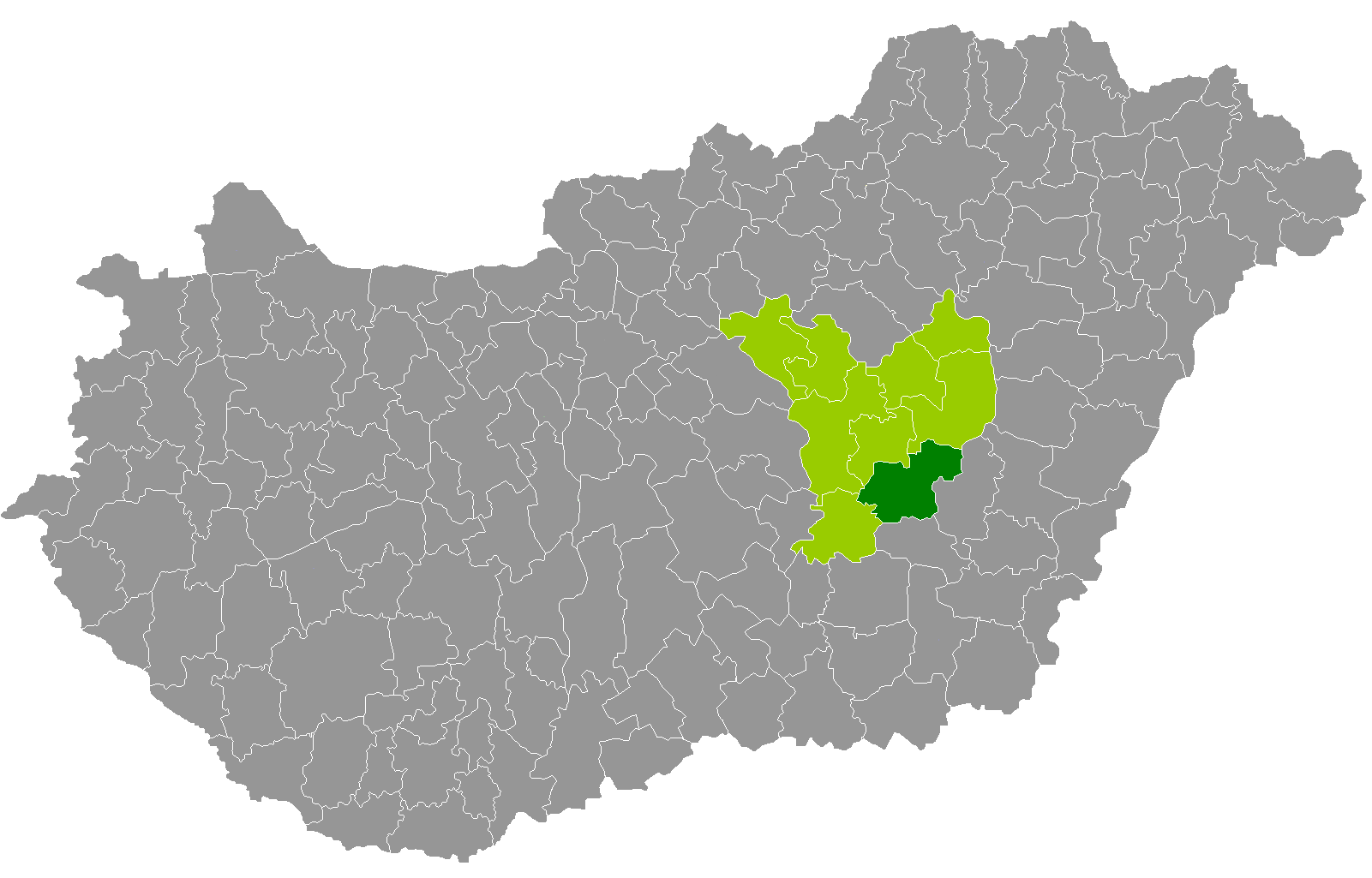
- Mezőtúr District within Hungary and Jász-Nagykun-Szolnok County.
- Country: Hungary
- County: Jász-Nagykun-Szolnok
- District seat: Mezőtúr

Area
  - Total: 725.74 km^{2} (280.21 sq mi)
  - Rank: 3rd in Jász-Nagykun-Szolnok

Population (2011 census)
  - Total: 28,191
  - Rank: 7th in Jász-Nagykun-Szolnok
  - Density: 39/km^{2} (100/sq mi)

Mezőtúr (Hungarian: Mezőtúri járás) is a district in south-eastern part of Jász-Nagykun-Szolnok County. Mezőtúr is also the name of the town where the district seat is found. The district is located in the Northern Great Plain Statistical Region. This district is a part of Nagykunság historical and geographical region.

== Geography ==
Mezőtúr District borders with Törökszentmiklós District and Karcag District to the north, Gyomaendrőd District (Békés County) to the east, Szarvas District (Békés County) and Kunszentmárton District to the south, Szolnok District to the west. The number of the inhabited places in Mezőtúr District is 5.

== Municipalities ==
The district has 2 towns and 3 villages. (ordered by population, as of 1 January 2012)

- Kétpó (682)
- Mesterszállás (691)
- Mezőhék (317)
- **Mezőtúr** (17,337) – district seat
- **Túrkeve** (8,741)

The bolded municipalities are cities.

== Demographics ==
Religion in Mezőtúr District (2011 census)
1. Calvinism (20.2%)
2. Lutheranism (0.40%)
3. Catholic Church (9.10%)
4. Greek Catholicism (0.10%)
5. Other religions (0.70%)
6. Non-religious (43.6%)
7. Atheists (1.10%)
8. Undeclared (24.8%)

In 2011, it had a population of 28,191 and the population density was 39/km².

Year	County population	Change
2011	28,191	n/a

=== Ethnicity ===
Besides the Hungarian majority, the main minority is the Roma (approx. 1,000).

Total population (2011 census): 28,191
Ethnic groups (2011 census): Identified themselves: 24,515 persons:

- Hungarians: 23,576 (96.17%)
- Gypsies: 618 (2.52%)
- Others and indefinable: 321 (1.31%)

Approx. 3,500 persons in Mezőtúr District did not declare their ethnic group at the 2011 census.

=== Religion ===
Religious adherence in the county according to 2011 census:

- Reformed – 5,688;
- Catholic – 2,609 (Roman Catholic – 2,575; Greek Catholic – 34);
- Evangelical – 103;
- other religions – 185;
- Non-religious – 12,292;
- Atheism – 316;
- Undeclared – 6,998.

== Transport ==
=== Road network ===
- Main road (NW→SE): Törökszentmiklós... – **Mezőtúr District** (2 municipalities: Kétpó, Mezőtúr) – ...Mezőberény

=== Railway network ===
- Line 120 (NW→SE): Budapest... – **Mezőtúr District** (2 municipalities: Kétpó, Törökszentmiklós) – ...Lőkösháza
- Line 125 (N→E): **Mezőtúr District** (1 municipality: Mezőtúr) – ...Battonya

== Gallery ==
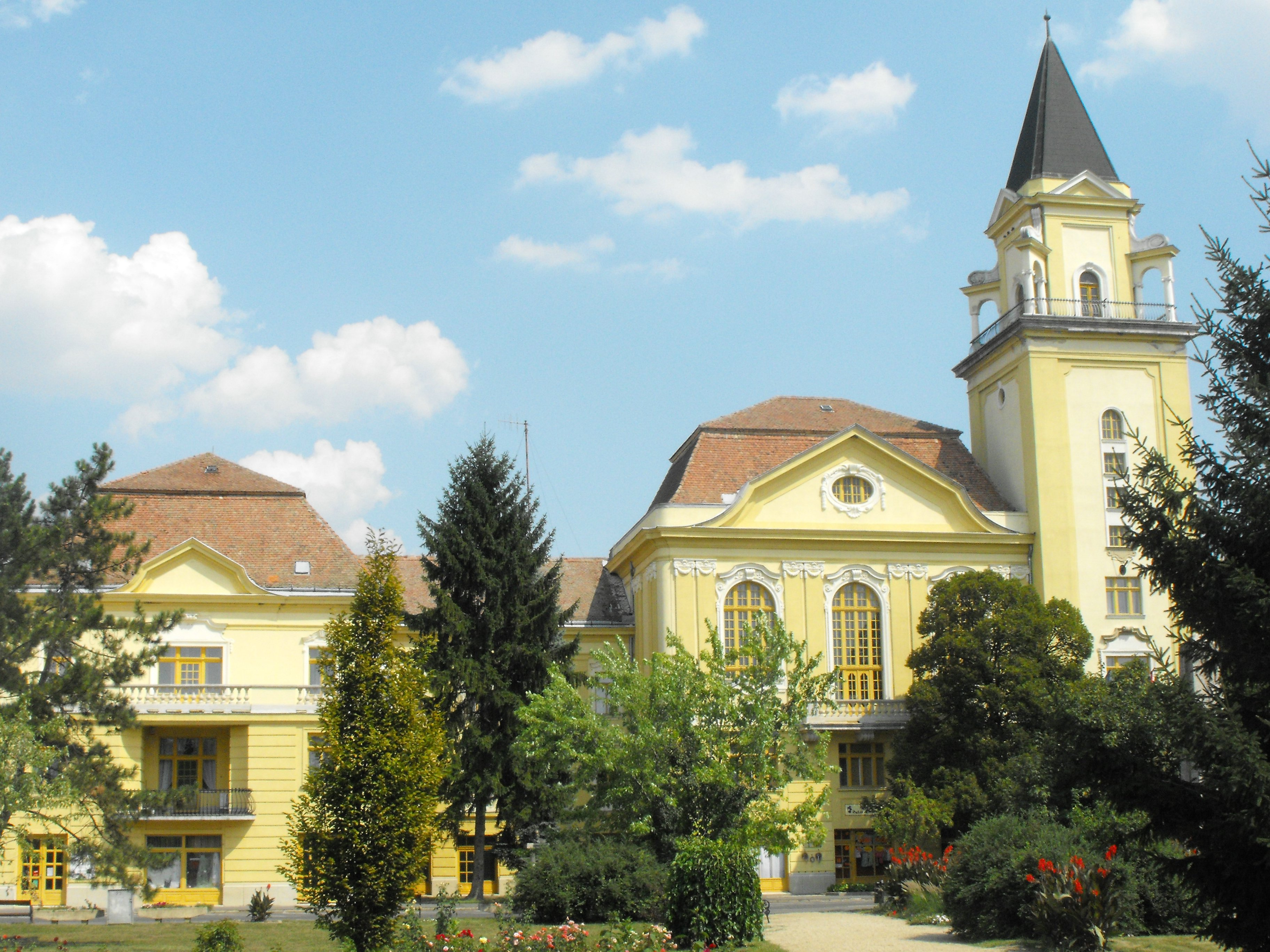
Mezőtúr, Town Hall

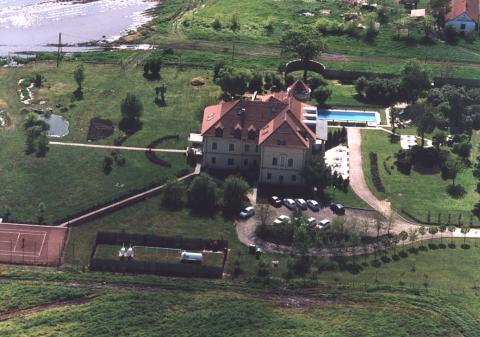
Aerial view of Kétpó

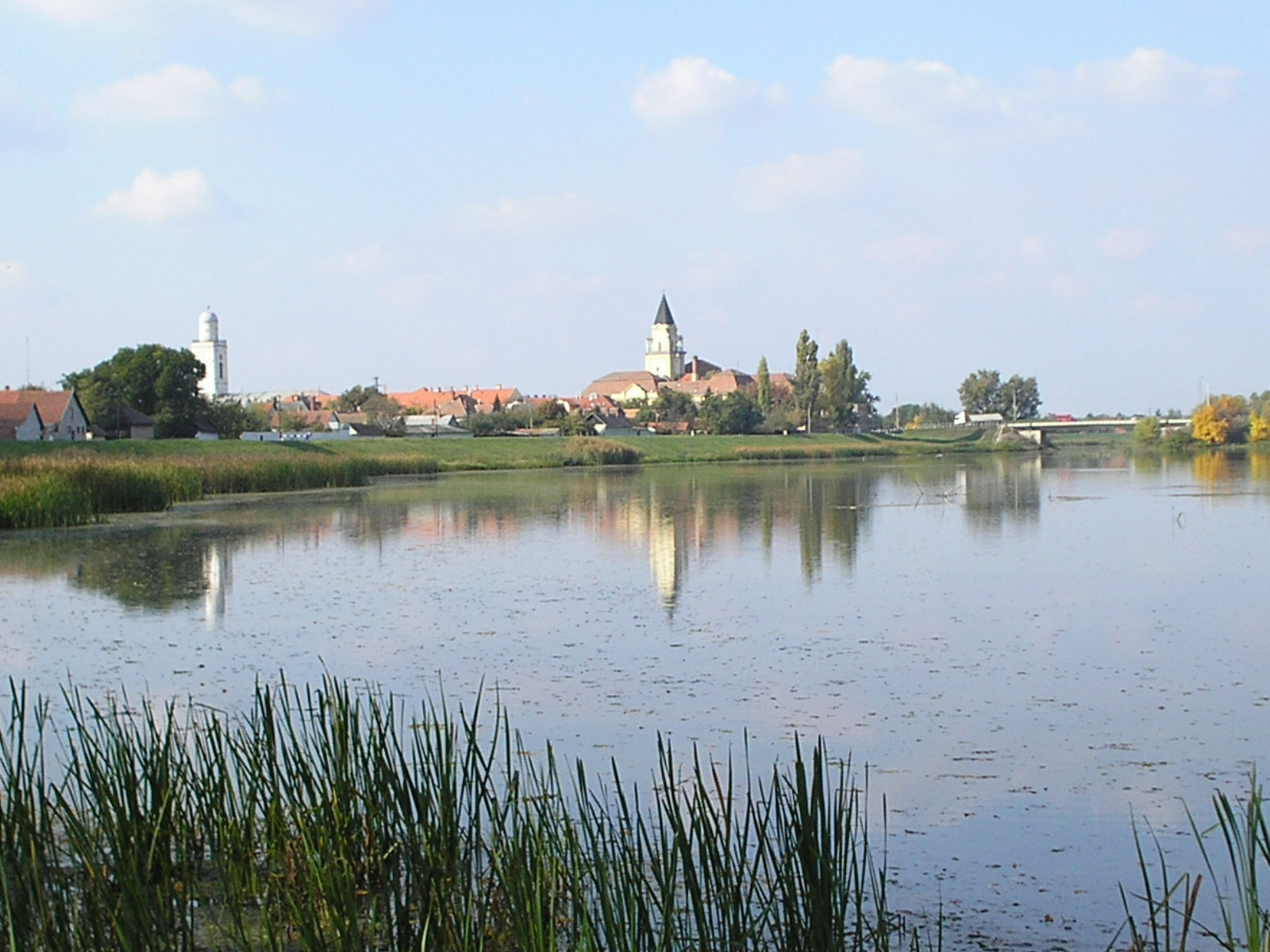
Hortobágy-Berettyó river near Mezőtúr

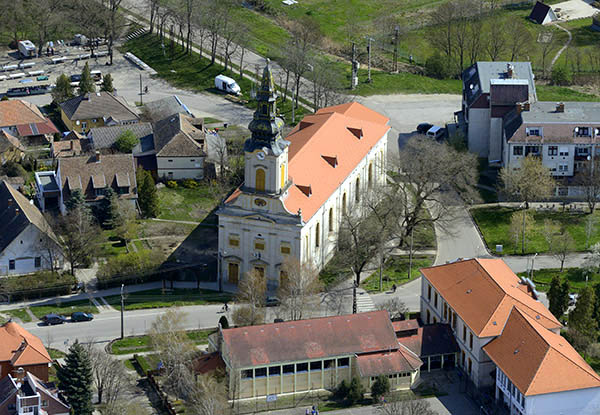
Reformed Church in Túrkeve

== See also ==
- List of cities and towns of Hungary
