= Norbert Pardi =

Hungarian scientist

- Born: February 19, 1981 (age 45); Szolnok, Hungary
- Education: University of Szeged (MSc and PhD)
- Occupation: Associate Professor
- Employer: University of Pennsylvania
- Known for: modified mRNA technologies used in COVID-19 vaccines
- Awards: Dennis Gabor Inventor Award (2021); BIAL Award in Biomedicine (2021); Young Investigator Award of the European Society of Clinical Microbiology and Infectious Diseases (2020); Postdoctoral Student Award from the Duke Center (2017)
- Website: https://www.pardilab.com

Norbert Pardi (born February 19, 1981) is a Hungarian biochemist researcher known for his contributions to the mRNA vaccine technology. He currently holds the position of a tenured associate professor of microbiology at the Perelman School of Medicine at the University of Pennsylvania. Pardi has conducted pioneering work in the development of mRNA vaccines, including those targeting influenza. He also contributed to the better understanding of the mechanism of action of mRNA vaccines.

== Early life and education ==
Norbert Pardi grew up in the Hungarian town of Kisújszállás. He earned an MSc and PhD degree in Biochemistry and Genetics at the University of Szeged in Hungary before moving to the United States in 2011 to work at the University of Pennsylvania.

== Career ==
At the University of Pennsylvania, Pardi started as a postdoctoral fellow. His scientific work has mainly focused on the delivery of nucleoside-modified mRNA in vivo to develop mRNA-based therapeutics and vaccines. He was mentored by the two mRNA-pioneers and nobelists Katalin Karikó and Drew Weissman and published several key papers, that contributed to the advancement of the mRNA vaccine technology. After becoming a research assistant professor in 2019, Pardi became an assistant professor in 2021. Later on in 2024 he was offered the position of associate professor of Microbiology at the University of Pennsylvania, which he currently holds. He has more than 16 000 Citations and an h-Index of 54

== Awards and patents ==
Several awards were given to Norbert Pardi.

In 2017, he received the Postdoctoral Student Award from the Duke Center for HIV/AIDS Vaccine Immunology and Immunogen Discovery (CHAVI-ID).

Three years later in 2020, Pardi was honoured with the 2020 Young Investigator Award of the European Society of Clinical Microbiology and Infectious Diseases (ESCMID)

In 2021, he received the Dennis Gabor Inventor Award. In the same year, Pardi was also awarded the prestigious BIAL Award in Biomedicine as lead author of the honoured scientific paper.

Pardi has invented more than 16 technological advancements that led to being patented. Among them, Nucleoside-modified RNA for inducing an immune response against zika virus and Chimeric Influenza Virus Hemagglutinin mRNA-Based Vaccines and Uses Thereof.
