= Karcag =

- Town
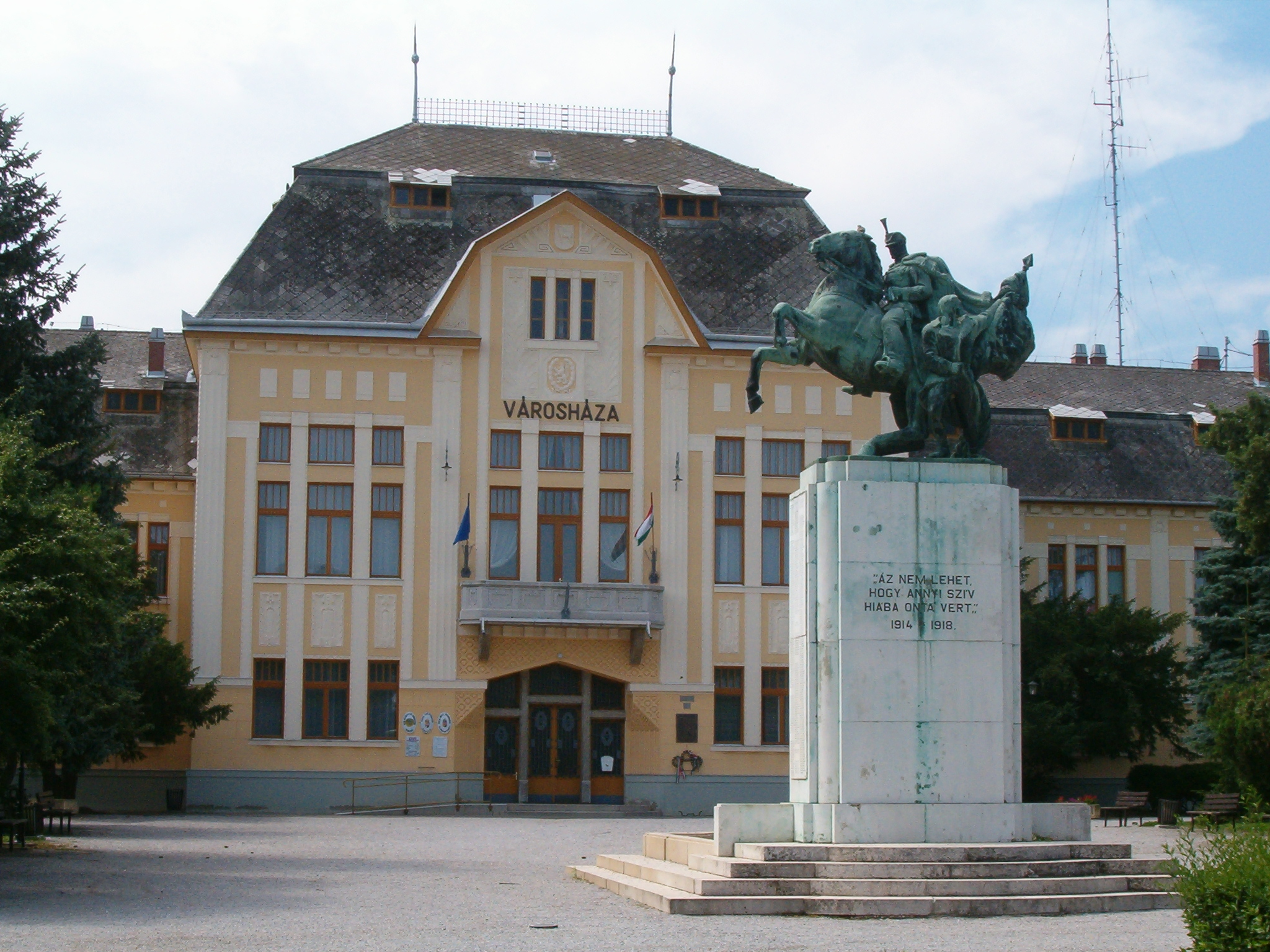
- City Hall in Karcag

- Flag Coat of arms

- Location of Karcag
- Coordinates: 47°18′40″N 20°54′58″E
- Country: Hungary
- Region: Northern Great Plain
- County: Jász-Nagykun-Szolnok
- District: Karcag

Area
  - Total: 368.63 km^{2} (142.33 sq mi)

Population (2018)
  - Total: 19,732
  - Density: 61.25/km^{2} (158.6/sq mi)
- Time zone: UTC+1 (CET)
  - Summer (DST): UTC+2 (CEST)
- Postal code: 5300
- Area code: (+36) 59
- Website: karcag.hu

Karcag (Hungarian pronunciation: [ˈkɒrt͡sɒg]) is a town in Jász-Nagykun-Szolnok county, in the Northern Great Plain region of central Hungary.

== Geography ==
Karcag covers an area of 368.63 km^{2} (142 sq mi) and has a population of 20,632 people (2011).

== Transport ==
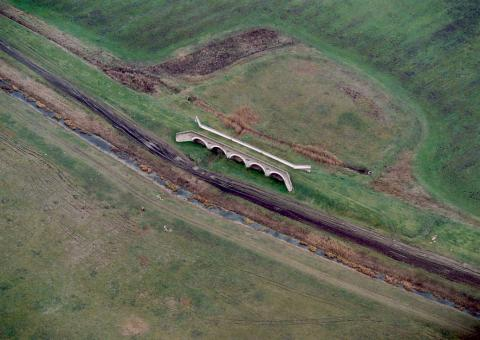
Aerial view of the Zádor Bridge

Karcag has its own railway station.

- Significant minority groups
- Nationality: Population (2011)
German	48
Romanian	20
Russian	8
Slovak	8
Serbian	6

== Politics ==
The current mayor of Karcag is László Dobos (Fidesz-KDNP).

The local Municipal Assembly, elected at the 2019 local government elections, is made up of 12 members (1 Mayor, 8 Individual constituencies MEPs and 3 Compensation List MEPs) divided into this political parties and alliances:

Party	Seats	Current Municipal Assembly
Fidesz-KDNP	9	M
Jobbik	2	
Momentum Movement	1	

== Twin towns – sister cities ==
Karcag is twinned with:

- Cristuru Secuiesc, Romania (1990)
- Kunszentmiklós, Hungary (2009)
- Lazdijai, Lithuania (2004)
- Lednice, Czech Republic (2006)
- Merki District, Kazakhstan (1998)
- Moldava nad Bodvou, Slovakia (1998)
- Schwarzheide, Germany (2004)
- Stara Moravica (Bačka Topola), Serbia (1994)

== Notable people ==
- István Varró (died in 1770), the last speaker of the Cuman language
- Colonel Michael de Kovats (1724–1779), the father of the US cavalry, a Hungarian hussar was born in Karcag
- Gyula (Julius) Németh (1890–1976), Hungarian Turkologist, linguist
- Avram Hershko (born 1937), Israeli biochemist and Nobel laureate in Chemistry
- Margit Sebők (1939–2000), painter and educator
- Kevin Varga (born 1996), footballer
- Mihály Varga (born 1965), politician, since 2013 Minister of National Economy
- Suzi Diamond, Holocaust survivor.
