= Pərdili =

- Municipality
- Location within Azerbaijan
- Coordinates: 39°10′58″N 48°17′19″E
- Country: Azerbaijan
- Rayon: Jalilabad

Population
  - Total: 992
- Time zone: UTC+4 (AZT)
  - Summer (DST): UTC+5 (AZT)

Pərdili (also, Pərdi, Pardu, and Pyardili) is a village and municipality in the Jalilabad Rayon of Azerbaijan. It has a population of 992.
