= Pardi, Bhopal =

Pardi
- village
- Location within Madhya Pradesh Location within India
- Coordinates: 23.4798896°N 77.4271665°E
- Country: India
- State: Madhya Pradesh
- District: Bhopal
- Tehsil: Berasia
- Elevation: 493 m (1,617 ft)

Population (2011)
  - Total: 629
- Time zone: UTC+5:30 (IST)
- ISO 3166 code: MP-IN
- 2011 census code: 482302

Pardi is a village in the Bhopal district of Madhya Pradesh, India. It is located in the Berasia tehsil.

== Demographics ==
According to the 2011 census of India, Pardi has 134 households. The effective literacy rate (i.e. the literacy rate of population excluding children aged 6 and below) is 78.9%.

Demographics (2011 Census)
	Total	Male	Female
Population	629	342	287
Children aged below 6 years	84	46	38
Scheduled caste	147	73	74
Scheduled tribe	0	0	0
Literates	430	269	161
Workers (all)	245	173	72
Main workers (total)	98	91	7
Main workers: Cultivators	57	56	1
Main workers: Agricultural labourers	6	2	4
Main workers: Household industry workers	1	1	0
Main workers: Other	34	32	2
Marginal workers (total)	147	82	65
Marginal workers: Cultivators	3	2	1
Marginal workers: Agricultural labourers	109	60	49
Marginal workers: Household industry workers	10	7	3
Marginal workers: Others	25	13	12
Non-workers	384	169	215
