= Kunmadaras =

- Large village
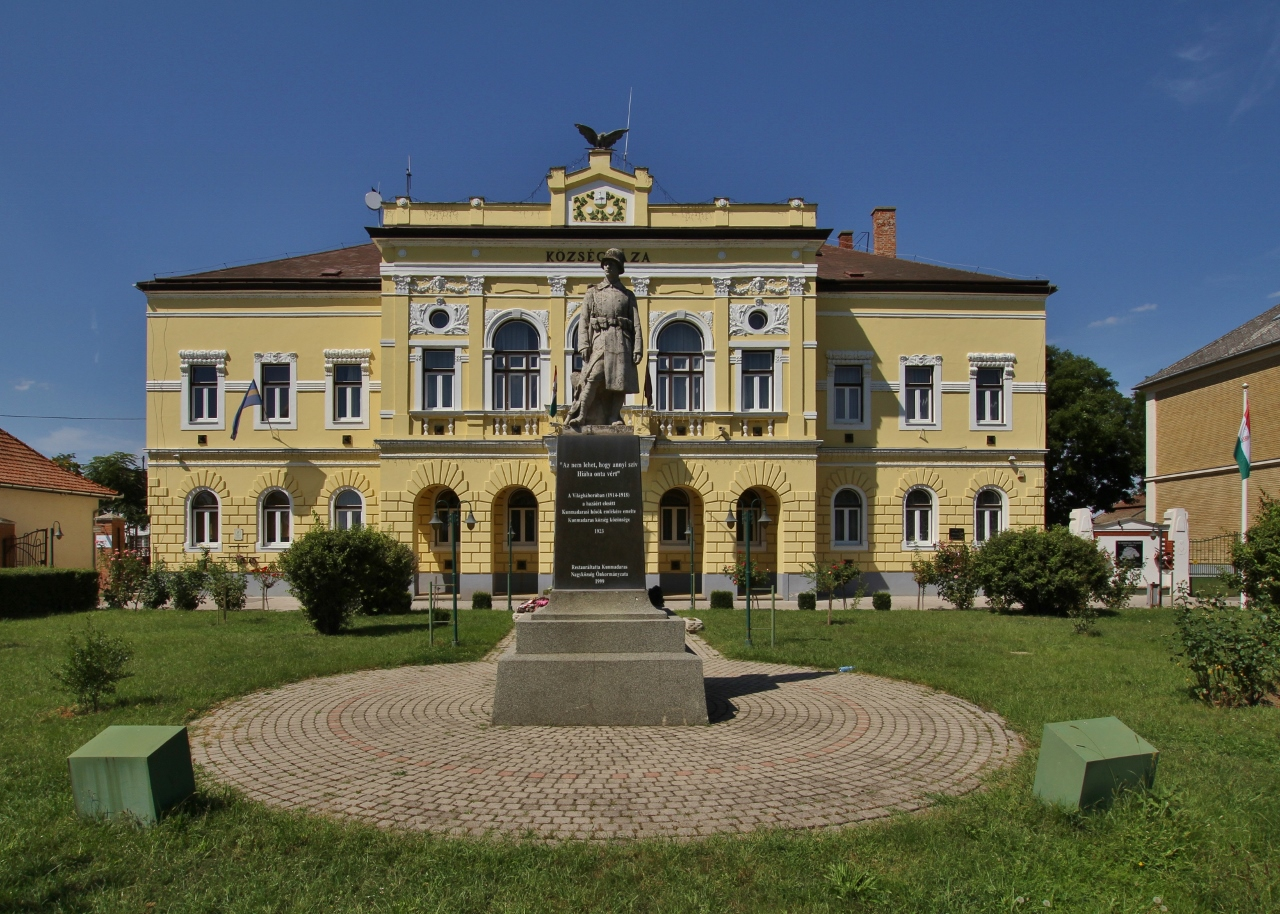
- Village hall and First World War monument

- Coat of arms

- Location within Hungary
- Coordinates: 47°25′41″N 20°47′38″E
- Country: Hungary
- County: Jász-Nagykun-Szolnok
- District: Karcag

Area
  - Total: 153.64 km^{2} (59.32 sq mi)

Population (2009)
  - Total: 5,507
  - Density: 36.22/km^{2} (93.8/sq mi)
- Time zone: UTC+1 (CET)
  - Summer (DST): UTC+2 (CEST)
- Postal code: 5321
- Area code(s): (+36) 59
- Website: kunmadaras.hu

Kunmadaras is a large village in Jász-Nagykun-Szolnok, Hungary.

== History ==
The first written record of the existence of the village is from 1393. According to it the area was given to György Madaras, after whom the village was named, by the Holy Roman Emperor, Sigismund, the king of Hungary.

During the Ottoman occupation the village was destroyed. In the 18th and 19th centuries the population began to increase again, and new houses and buildings were constructed. In 1811 it became a market town.

In 1944 the German army had a military airfield built at the edge of the village. During the Soviet invasion of Hungary in 1944 the Soviet air force took over the airfield.

== Jewish pogrom ==
In 1946 there was a violent attack on Jewish Holocaust survivors (the Kunmadaras pogrom) inspired by a rumour that they were murdering and consuming ("making sausages out of") children. Three Jews were killed and twenty were injured.

== Military role in the socialist period ==
Between 1956 and 1991 Soviet army troops were stationed here. According to a book by Károly Vándor, this airfield was one of the military facilities in which nuclear weapons were held during the Cold War. The Soviet 328th independent Reconnaissance Aviation Regiment, Southern Group of Forces, was stationed at Kunmadaras until 1990–91, whereupon it was withdrawn back to the Odessa region and disbanded.

== Population ==
In 2001 the inhabitants of the village declared themselves as 95% Hungarian and 5% Romanis.
