= Mezőtúr =

- Town
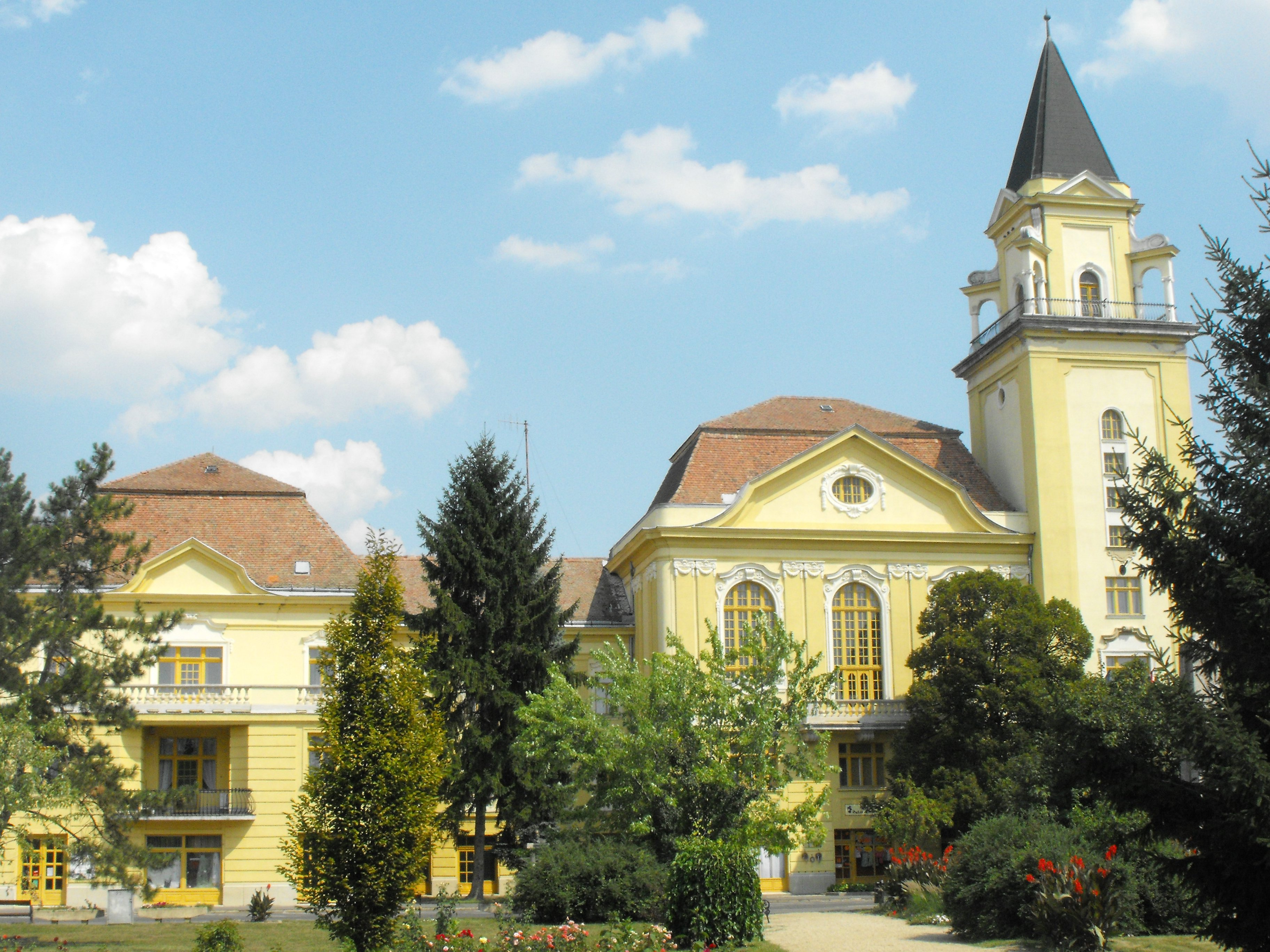
- Town hall

- Flag Coat of arms

- Location within Hungary
- Coordinates: 47°00′N 20°38′E
- Country: Hungary
- County: Jász-Nagykun-Szolnok
- District: Mezőtúr

Area
  - Total: 289.72 km^{2} (111.86 sq mi)

Population (2001)
  - Total: 19,483
  - Density: 67/km^{2} (170/sq mi)
- Time zone: UTC+1 (CET)
  - Summer (DST): UTC+2 (CEST)
- Postal code: 5400
- Area code: (+36) 56
- Website: mezotur.hu

Mezőtúr is a town in Jász-Nagykun-Szolnok county in Hungary, located southeast from Budapest and 88 miles away by rail. It possesses important potteries. Large herds of cattle are reared on the communal lands, which are productive also of wheat, rapeseed and maize. Several well-attended fairs are held here annually.

== Location ==
Mezőtúr lies in the centre of the Great Hungarian Plain, on the banks of the Hortobágy-Berettyó, near the Budapest–Szolnok–Békéscsaba railway line.

== History ==
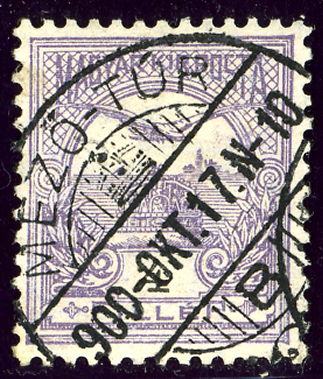
In the Kingdom of Hungary in 1900

The town was founded in the Middle Ages and it was called Túr after the river Berettyó, which was formerly named Túr. Later it was named Mezőtúr (mező means field, referring to the good soil of the Great Plain.) The town was first mentioned under King Andrew II (1205–1235) as villa Tur. The shortest road between Buda and Transylvania led through Mezőtúr, which was the only town in the area having a ferry. Because of this advantage the town prospered and King Louis the Great made it a market town. In the 15th century it held famous markets, and its importance grew.

Mezőtúr was a royal estate until 1378, later it had various owners, and under King Matthias the town was divided into two parts because it was granted to two different people.

During the Ottoman occupation of Hungary, Mezőtúr fell under Ottoman rule in 1562 and was freed in 1692. After the expelling of the Ottomans and during the revolution led by Prince Rákóczi the citizens had to leave the town twice (1692–1699 and 1705–1710).

In the 18th century the town began to prosper again, mainly as an agricultural town.

After the Ottoman occupation until 1918, Mezőtúr was part of the Austrian monarchy, province of Hungary; (in Transleithania after the compromise of 1867) in the Kingdom of Hungary.

Following World War One and the instability in Hungary, it became a part of the Hungarian Kingdom. During World War Two, Mezőtúr was occupied by the German Army before being fought over by the Soviets, who captured Mezőtúr in late 1944. The city was damaged; the railway bridge over the Hortobágy-Berettyó river was destroyed, requiring the current one to be built after the war. A monument was erected near the city hall to commemorate the fighting during the war.

Starting in the 16th century and going throughout the 19th and 20th centuries, Mezotur produced pottery. The pottery industry slowed in the 1950s, but still is a cultural landmark.

The post-office was opened in 1853.

== Travel ==
Mezőtúr is a large railroad hub, serviced by MÁV. The railway station and the nearby storage shed are very old. There are five passenger tracks with three platforms, with an additional three freight tracks and a disused storage track. There are daily trains between Mezőtúr and Szolnok, Mezőtúr and Orosháza-Mezőhegyes, as well as being on the important Budapest Keleti-Szolnok-Békéscsaba-Lőkösháza railway line with daily trains to Budapest, among others. There used to be rail service to the nearby town of Túrkeve, but this railroad was closed in the 1960s due to low ridership, and the tracks later removed.

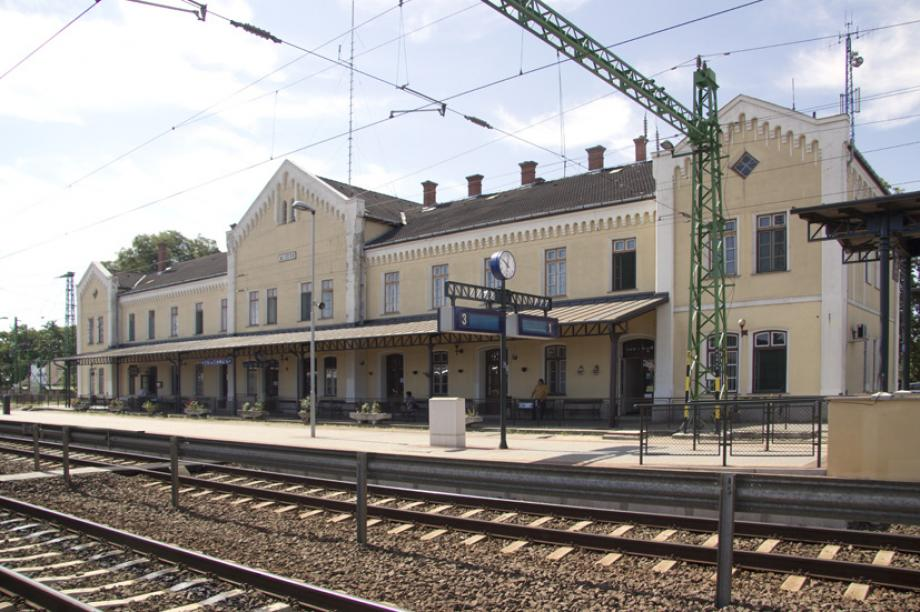
The Mezőtúr railway station

== Politics ==
The current mayor of Mezőtúr is Dániel Szűcs (Fidesz-KDNP).

The local Municipal Assembly, elected at the 2019 local government elections, is made up of 12 members (1 Mayor, 8 Individual constituencies MEPs and 3 Compensation List MEPs) divided into this political parties and alliances:

Party	Seats	Current Municipal Assembly
Fidesz-KDNP	6	M
TEKE	6	

== Twin towns – sister cities ==
Mezőtúr is twinned with:

- Arcuș, Romania
- Blatná na Ostrove, Slovakia
- Novi Bečej, Serbia
- Valea Crișului, Romania
- Maków Podhalański, Poland

== Notable people ==
- Leslie Gonda (1919-2018), American businessman, born there as Lászlo Goldschmied
- Joseph Kovács (1926-2019), Brazilian aeronautical designer and engineer, creator of several aircraft, including the Neiva Universal and the Embraer EMB 312 Tucano, born there as József Gábor Kovács
