= Pardi, Dahanu =

Village in Maharashtra

Pardi
- village
- Location in Maharashtra, India Pardi (India)
- Coordinates: 20.0497498°N 72.9002836°E
- Country: India
- State: Maharashtra
- District: Palghar
- Taluka: Dahanu
- Elevation: 70 m (230 ft)

Population (2011)
  - Total: 632
- Time zone: UTC+5:30 (IST)
- 2011 census code: 551641

Pardi is a village in the Palghar district of Maharashtra, India. It is located in the Dahanu taluka.

== Demographics ==
According to the 2011 census of India, Pardi has 50 households. The effective literacy rate (i.e. the literacy rate of population excluding children aged 6 and below) is 88.49%.

Demographics (2011 Census)
	Total	Male	Female
Population	632	370	262
Children aged below 6 years	41	19	22
Scheduled caste	8	6	2
Scheduled tribe	544	315	229
Literates	523	326	197
Workers (all)	116	62	54
Main workers (total)	84	53	31
Main workers: Cultivators	6	6	0
Main workers: Agricultural labourers	59	31	28
Main workers: Household industry workers	0	0	0
Main workers: Other	19	16	3
Marginal workers (total)	32	9	23
Marginal workers: Cultivators	1	1	0
Marginal workers: Agricultural labourers	28	6	22
Marginal workers: Household industry workers	0	0	0
Marginal workers: Others	3	2	1
Non-workers	516	308	208
