= Kenderes =

- Town
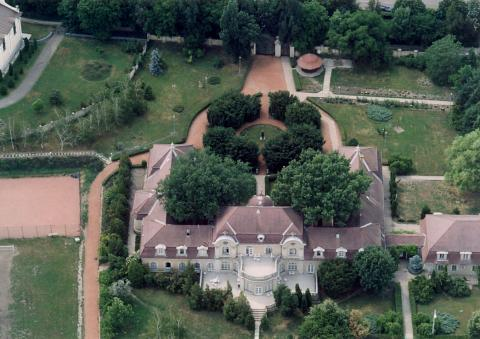
- Aerial view of manor in Kenderes

- Flag Coat of arms

- Location within Hungary
- Coordinates: 47°14′49″N 20°40′26″E
- Country: Hungary
- County: Jász-Nagykun-Szolnok
- District: Karcag

Area
  - Total: 111.24 km^{2} (42.95 sq mi)

Population (2015)
  - Total: 4,508
  - Density: 40.52/km^{2} (105.0/sq mi)
- Time zone: UTC+1 (CET)
  - Summer (DST): UTC+2 (CEST)
- Postal code: 5331, 5349
- Area code: (+36) 59
- Website: www.kenderes.hu

Kenderes (Hungarian pronunciation: [ˈkɛndɛrɛʃ]) is a small town in Jász-Nagykun-Szolnok county, Hungary. It is notable as the birthplace of Miklós Horthy, Regent of the Kingdom of Hungary from 1920 to 1944, and for the many memorials dedicated to him around the town. A major tourist attraction is Horthy kastély (Horthy Castle) which has exhibitions and a special tribute to Miklós Horthy every year on 18 June.

== Location, Geography ==
The town is bisected by Route 4, halfway between the cities of Debrecen and Szolnok. It lies in the Great Hungarian Plain, thus its geography is defined by flat expanses. It is surrounded by cornfields, groves and mountain tracks. Some of the older buildings are protected by the National Bureau. The settlement was granted town rights in 2004. The town has a population of 5329 people, with a density of 47.9 /km². The majority of the inhabitants are ethnically Hungarian.

== History ==
The town developed from a series of 16th Century Catholic parishes. It became more formally settled around 1771 as a jobbágy faluból or serf village. It became Kenderes after the 1848 revolutions which swept across much of Europe. The late Baroque Catholic church, built by Count Antal Haller, began in 1783 and was completed in 1800. Later works were completed in 1923. The church houses many fine paintings. The impact of a WWI projectile is still visible in one of its walls. The town showed spectacular growth between the wars, and again after the 1956 revolution, but has since slowed.

== Horthy Castle ==
The estate centred on the Baroque manor house passed in the nineteenth century to the Hódosy and Borbély families before it was inherited by the Horthy family in 1850. Miklós Horthy was born here and reburied here after the Revolutions of 1989, the dissolution of the Warsaw Pact and the withdrawal of Russian/Soviet troops. His will stated that he was not to be returned there until "the last Russian soldier has left."

Originally called Halassy Mansion, the castle was built in the early 1800s. It took its present name in 1850 from István Horthy, the father of Miklós. It was a simple U-shaped building and 1925 was reconstructed in neo-baroque style according to the plans of Franz Kalin. In 1944, it was looted by the Nazis, who removed anything of value and burned the rest. Since then it has been used as a granary, horse stables, and an agricultural school. The exterior has been preserved as well as some of the rooms. Currently it serves as tourist accommodation and as rooms for students.

== Twin towns – sister cities ==
Kenderes is twinned with:

- Kozy, Poland (2004)
- Predappio, Italy (2005)
- Sabinov, Slovakia (2002)
- Sânmartin, Romania (2007)
