= Mesterszállás =

- Village
- Coat of arms

- Location within Hungary
- Coordinates: 46°57′22″N 20°25′52″E
- Country: Hungary
- County: Jász-Nagykun-Szolnok
- District: Mezőtúr

Area
  - Total: 42.92 km^{2} (16.57 sq mi)

Population (2015)
  - Total: 702
  - Density: 16.4/km^{2} (42/sq mi)
- Time zone: UTC+1 (CET)
  - Summer (DST): UTC+2 (CEST)
- Postal code: 5452
- Area code(s): (+36) 56

Mesterszállás is a village in Jász-Nagykun-Szolnok county, in the Northern Great Plain region of central Hungary.

== Geography ==
It covers an area of 42.92 km^{2} (17 sq mi) and has a population of 702 people (2015).
