= Ecsegfalva =

Coordinates: 47°09′N 20°55′E

- Interactive map of Ecsegfalva
- Country: Hungary
- County: Békés

Area
  - Total: 78.99 km^{2} (30.50 sq mi)

Population (2015)
  - Total: 1,255
  - Density: 15.9/km^{2} (41/sq mi)
- Time zone: UTC+1 (CET)
  - Summer (DST): UTC+2 (CEST)
- Postal code: 5515
- Area code: 66

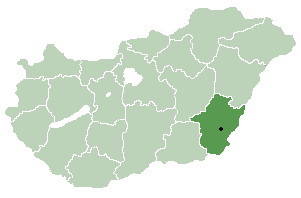
Location of Békés County in Hungary

Ecsegfalva is a village in Békés County, in the Southern Great Plain region of south-east Hungary.

== Geography ==
It covers an area of 78.99 km^{2} and has a population of 1255 people (2015).
