= Berekfürdő =

- Village
- Coat of arms

- Location within Hungary
- Coordinates: 47°23′12″N 20°50′41″E
- Country: Hungary
- County: Jász-Nagykun-Szolnok
- District: Karcag

Area
  - Total: 18.57 km^{2} (7.17 sq mi)

Population (2015)
  - Total: 1,010
  - Density: 54.4/km^{2} (141/sq mi)
- Time zone: UTC+1 (CET)
  - Summer (DST): UTC+2 (CEST)
- Postal code: 5309
- Area code(s): (+36) 59

Berekfürdő is a village in Jász-Nagykun-Szolnok county, in the Northern Great Plain region of central Hungary.

== Geography ==
It covers an area of 18.57 km^{2} (7 sq mi).

== Population ==
It has a population of 1,010 people (2015).
