= Túrkeve =

- Town
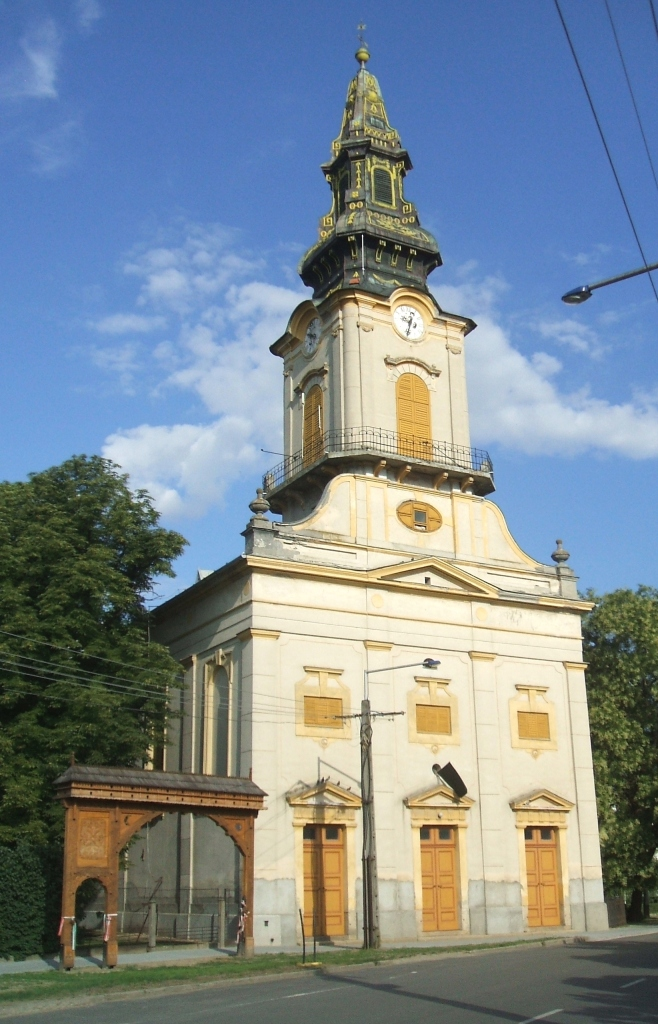
- Calvinist church in Túrkeve

- Flag Coat of arms

- Location within Hungary
- Coordinates: 47°06′14″N 20°44′31″E
- Country: Hungary
- County: Jász-Nagykun-Szolnok
- District: Mezőtúr

Area
  - Total: 236.52 km^{2} (91.32 sq mi)

Population (2011)
  - Total: 9,008
  - Density: 38.1/km^{2} (99/sq mi)
- Time zone: UTC+1 (CET)
  - Summer (DST): UTC+2 (CEST)
- Postal code: 5420
- Area code: (+36) 56
- Website: www.turkeve.hu

Túrkeve is a town in Jász-Nagykun-Szolnok county, in the Northern Great Plain region of Hungary.

== Geography ==
It covers an area of 236.52 km^{2} (91.32 sq mi).

== Demographics ==
According to the 2011 census, the total population of Túrkeve was 9,008, of whom there were 87.8% Hungarians and 2.4% Romani by ethnicity. 12.2% did not declare their ethnicity, excluding these people Hungarians made up 100% of the total population. In Hungary people can declare more than one ethnicity, so some people declared a minority one along with Hungarian.

Túrkeve is one of the least religious town in Hungary, 56.7% of the population was irreligious, while 17.9% was Hungarian Reformed (Calvinist) and 4.4% Roman Catholic.

== Travel ==
There used to be a railway (link to the Hungarian Wikipedia page) connecting Mezőtúr and Túrkeve, owned by MÁV. However, due to low ridership, this was closed in the 1960s, and the track was removed thereafter. With the closure of the only rail line between Túrkeve and any other city, the other form of transport is through road, including a daily bus service.

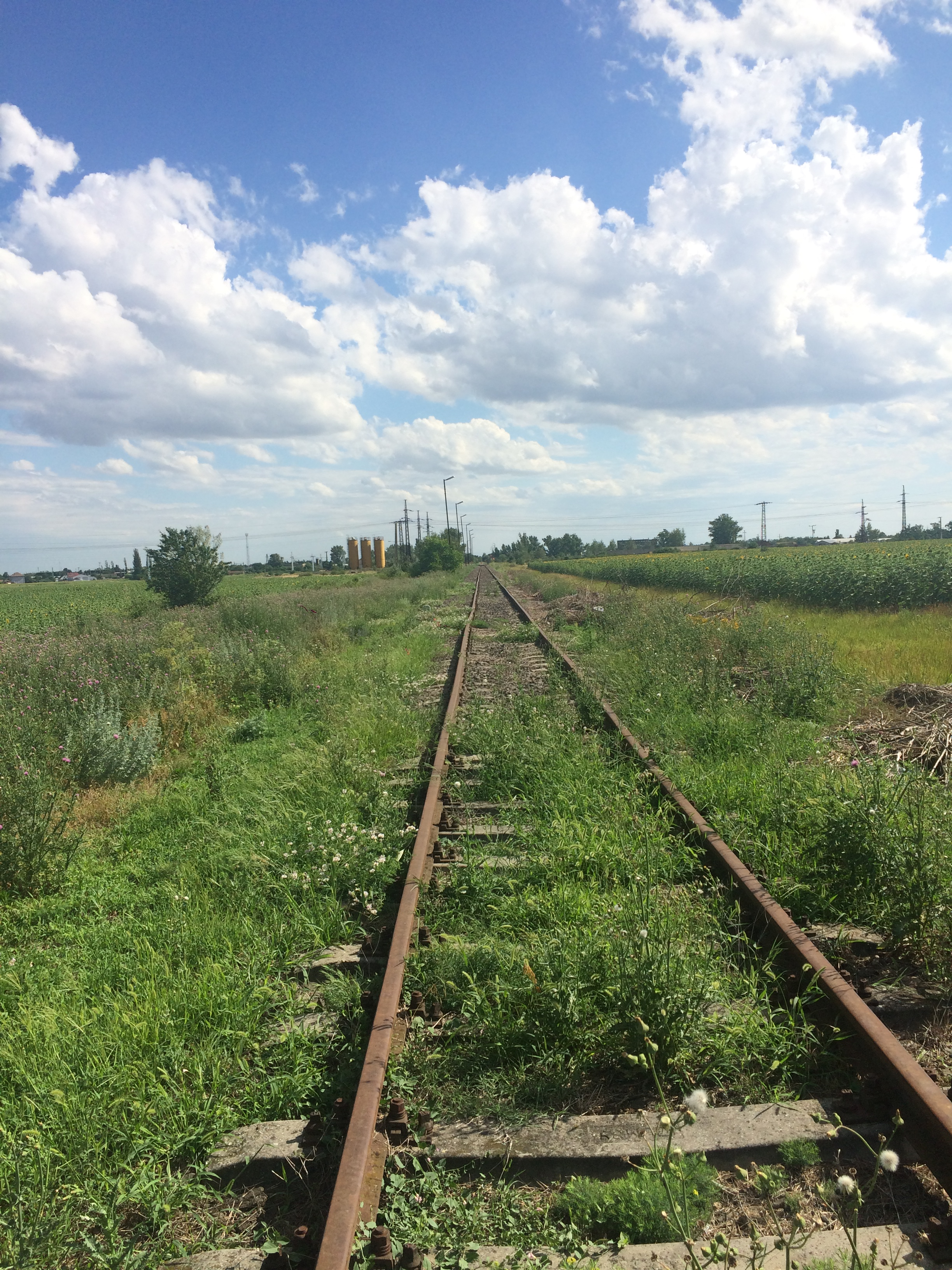
The remainder of the railway, facing Mezőtúr. Behind the camera is the direction of Túrkeve.

== Politics ==
The current mayor of Túrkeve is Róbert Benedek Sallai (Independent).

The local Municipal Assembly, elected at the 2019 local government elections, is made up of 9 members (1 Mayor and 8 Individual list MEPs) divided into this political parties and alliances:

Party	Seats	Current Municipal Assembly
Independent	5	M
Fidesz-KDNP	2	
MSZP	2	

== Notable people from Túrkeve ==
- Alexander Finta (1881–1958), Hungarian-American artist
- Alexander Korda (1893–1956), Hungarian-British film producer
- Zoltan Korda (1895–1961), Hungarian-American film director
- Vincent Korda (1897–1979), Hungarian-British art director

== Twin towns – sister cities ==
Túrkeve is twinned with:

- Auchel, France
- Mezőhegyes, Hungary
- Porąbka, Poland
- Salonta, Romania
- Velykyi Bychkiv, Ukraine
