= Maslovka (disambiguation) =

Maslovka is a village (selo) in Valuysky District, Belgorod Oblast, Russia.

Maslovka (Russian: Масловка) may also refer to:

- Maslovka, Prokhorovsky District, Belgorod Oblast, a selo
- Maslovka, Medvensky District, Kursk Oblast, a village
- Maslovka, Voronezh Oblast, a selo

== See also ==
- Maslov, a Russian surname
