= Maslov =

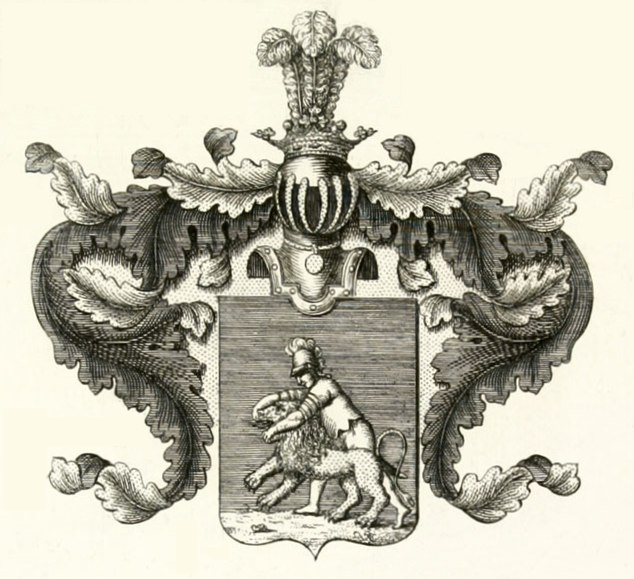
Maslov II c.o.a

Maslov or Maslow (Russian: Маслов), Maslova or Maslowa is a Russian surname associated with Russian noble Maslov families. It can also be Germanized as Masloff. Notable people with the surname include:

- Abraham Maslow (1908–1970), American psychologist
- Aleksandr Maslov (born 1969), Russian football player and coach
- Aleksey Maslov (born 1966), Russian alpine skier
- Alexey Maslov (1953–2022), Russian general, commander-in-chief of the Ground Forces
- Anna Maslova (1934–2024), Russian electrician and politician
- Arkadi Maslow (1891–1941), German communist politician
- Darya Maslova (born 1995), Kyrgyzstani long-distance runner
- Dina Maslova, journalist from Kyrgyzstan
- Eugene Maslov (1945–2011), Russian billiards coach
- Igor Maslov (born 1995), Russian football player
- James Maslow (born 1990), American actor and singer
- Jonathan Maslow (1948–2008), American journalist and author
- Leonid Maslov (born 1935), Lithuanian and Uzbekistani chess master
- Nina Maslova (born 1946), Russian actress
- Pavel Maslov (born 2000), Russian football player
- Petr Maslov (economist)
- Petr Maslov (artist) (born 1962), Russian graphic and installation artist
- Sergey Maslov (disambiguation), multiple people
- Sophie Maslow (1911–2006), American choreographer, dancer and teacher
- Steve Maslow (1944–2026), American sound engineer
- Valeriia Maslova (born 2001), Russian handball player
- Viktor Maslov (disambiguation), multiple people
- Vladimir Maslov (1941–1998), Russian film and theatrical director
- Walter Maslow (1928–2025), American actor
- Will Maslow (1907–2007), American lawyer and civil rights leader
- Yevgeni Maslov (born 1966), Russian football player and coach
- Yuriy Maslov (born 1968), Ukrainian economist, educator, public and state figure
- Katyusha Maslova from the novel Resurrection by Leo Tolstoy

== See also ==
- Katyusha Maslova, unfinished opera by Dmitri Shostakovich
  - Katjuscha Maslowa, 1923 German silent drama film
- Maslo, a surname
- Maslow (disambiguation)
