= Petr Maslov =

Petr Maslov may refer to:

- Petr Maslov (artist)
- Petr Maslov (economist)
