= Hungary–Kosovo relations =

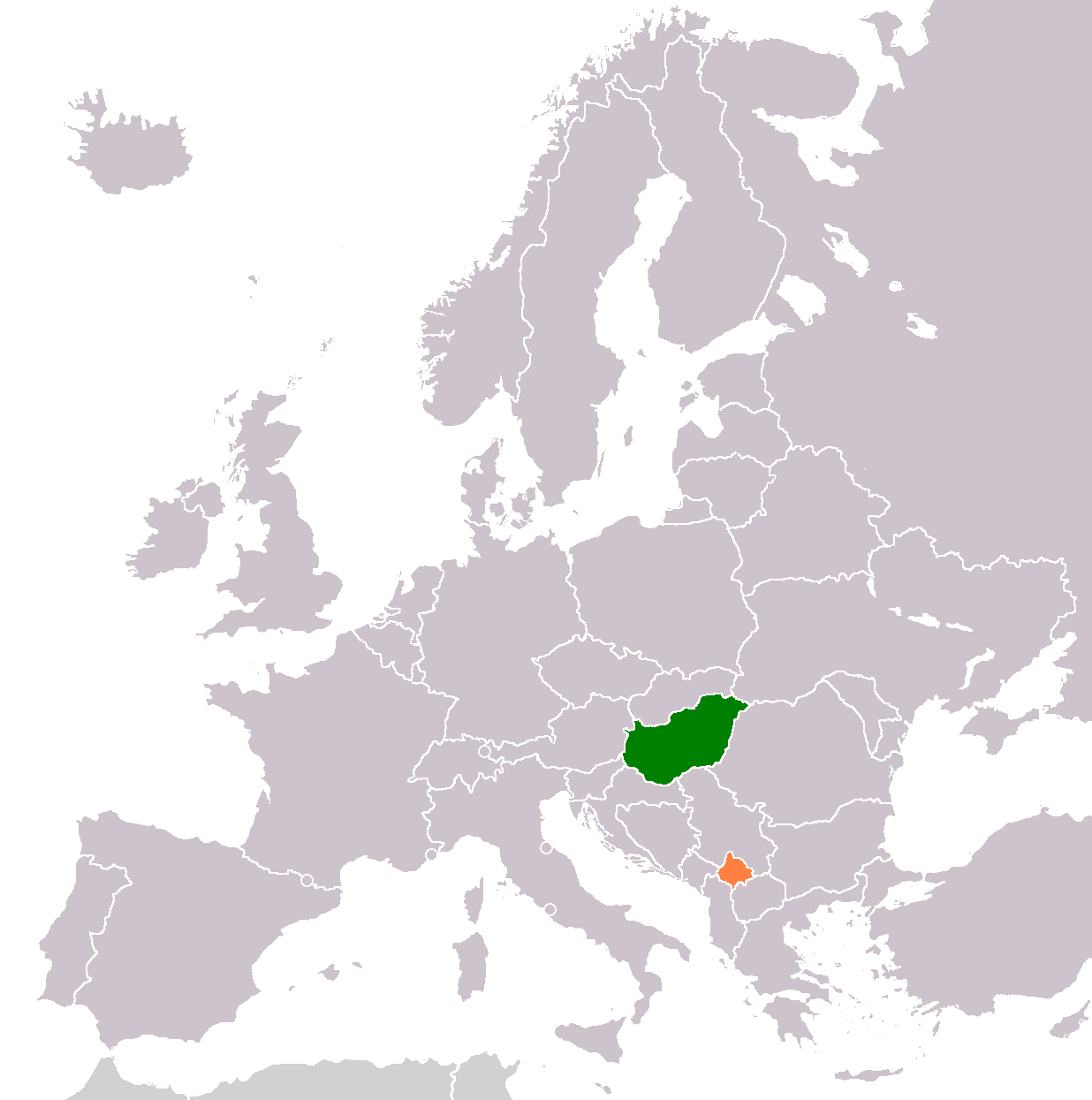

- Hungary: Kosovo

Diplomatic mission
- Embassy of Hungary, Pristina: Embassy of Kosovo, Budapest

Envoy
- Ambassador József Bencze: Ambassador Shpend Kallaba

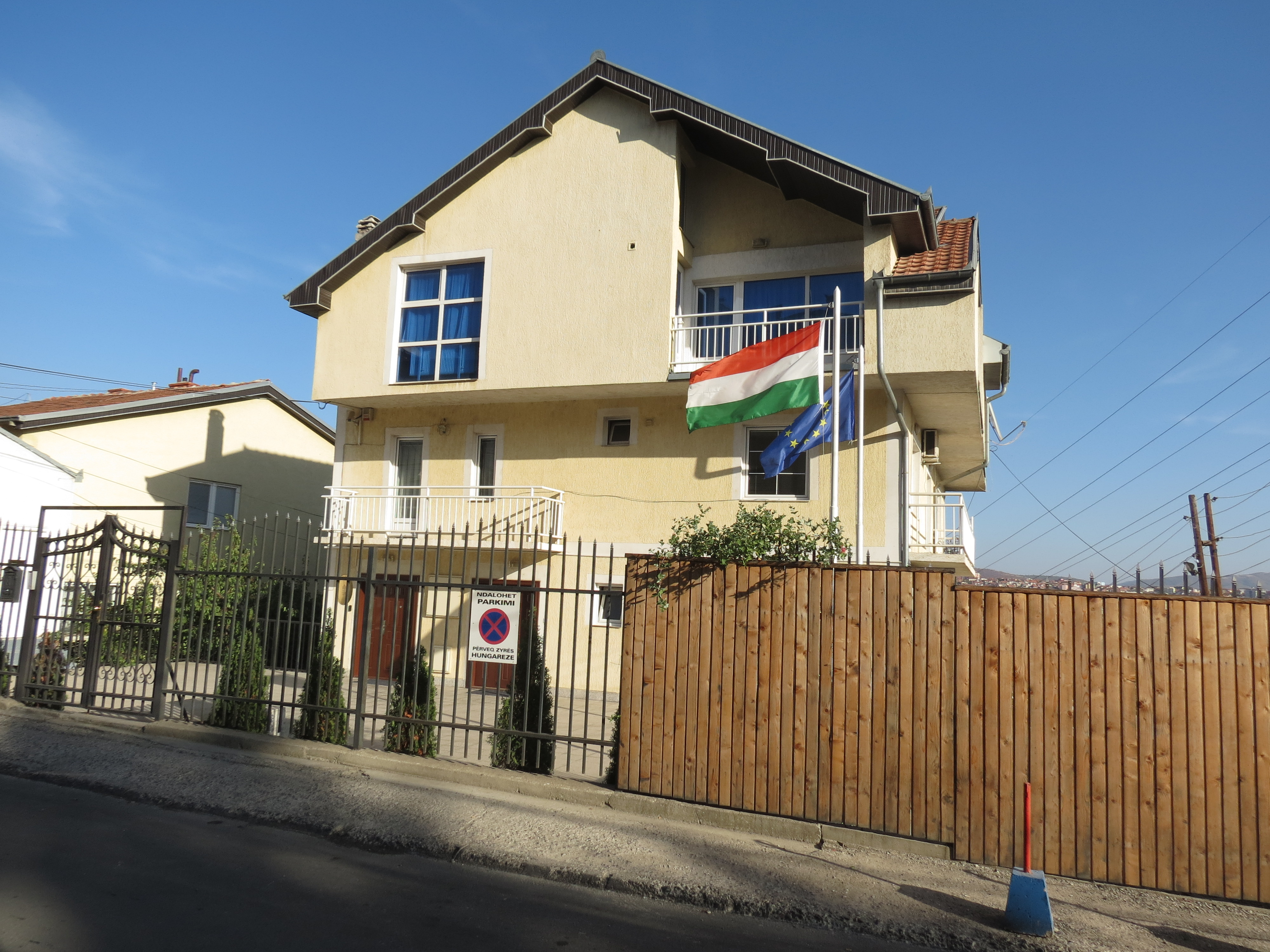
Embassy of Hungary in Kosovo

The Hungary–Kosovo relations are foreign relations between Hungary and Kosovo. Kosovo declared its independence from Serbia on 17 February 2008 and Hungary recognised it on 19 March 2008. Hungary has an embassy in Pristina.

== History ==
Despite Hungary's recognition of Kosovo's independence, Minister of Foreign Affairs of Hungary Péter Szijjártó stated in January 2023 that Hungary would vote against Kosovo's accession to European organizations until a deal was reached with Serbia. In April 2023, Hungary along with Azerbaijan, Armenia, Cyprus, Georgia, Romania, Serbia and Spain voted against approving Kosovo's membership in the Council of Europe.

== Military ==
Hungary had 411 troops serving in Kosovo as peacekeepers in the NATO-led Kosovo Force as of June 2024.

== See also ==
- Foreign relations of Hungary
- Foreign relations of Kosovo
- Kosovo-NATO relations
- Accession of Kosovo to the EU
- Hungary–Serbia relations
- Hungary–Yugoslavia relations
