= Croatia–Hungary relations =

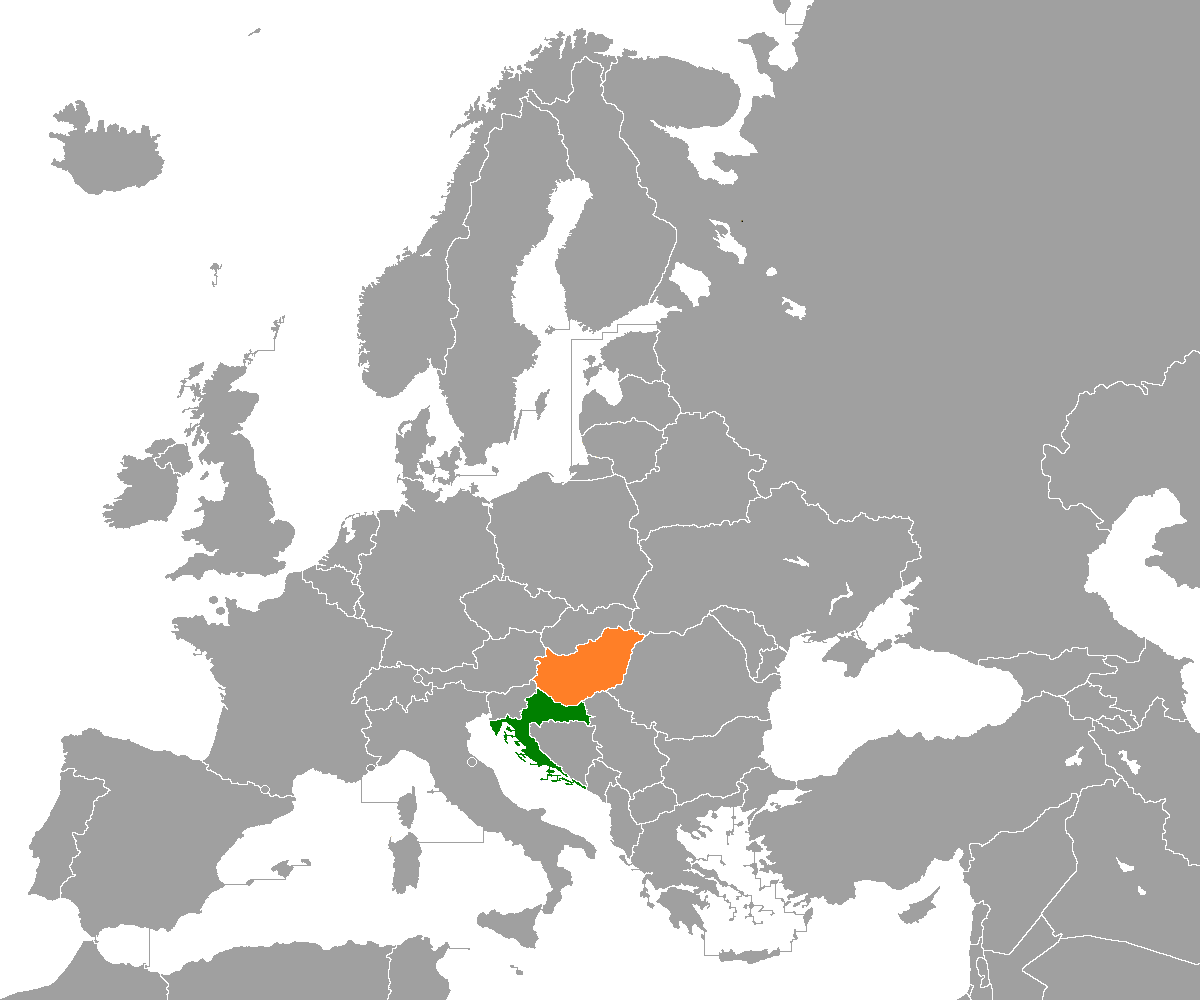

- Croatia: Hungary

Diplomatic mission
- Embassy of Croatia, Budapest: Embassy of Hungary, Zagreb

The foreign relations between Croatia and Hungary are bound together by shared history, political development and geography. The two states established diplomatic relations on 18 January 1992 following the dissolution of Yugoslavia and the independence of Croatia.

In 1102, the previously independent Kingdom of Croatia and Kingdom of Hungary entered personal union and the two were henceforth ruled by the same monarch. Following the Ottoman conquests and a disastrous defeat at the Battle of Mohács in 1526, Croatian nobility elected the Holy Roman Emperor Ferdinand I as the new king of Croatia. The Hungarian nobility was divided, but the Habsburgs annexed the Kingdom of Hungary, keeping Croatia and Hungary under a single crown. During the Hungarian Revolution of 1848, Croatia sided with the Austrians, so the Croatian Ban Josip Jelačić helped Austria to defeat the Hungarian forces in 1849, ushering in a period of Germanisation. By the 1860s, the failure of this policy became apparent, leading to the Austro-Hungarian Compromise of 1867 and the creation of a personal union between the crowns of the Austrian Empire and the Kingdom of Hungary. The issue of Croatia's status was resolved by the Croatian–Hungarian Settlement of 1868, when the kingdoms of Croatia and Slavonia were united into the Kingdom of Croatia-Slavonia. Following the breakup of Austria-Hungary after its defeat in World War I, the Croatian Parliament declared independence on 29 October 1918 and decided to join the newly formed State of Slovenes, Croats and Serbs, ending Habsburg rule and the personal union with Hungary after 816 years. Through the Treaty of Trianon, Hungary lost Međimurje County and the southern part of Baranya to Croatia. With Croatia forming part of Yugoslavia after both World Wars, relations between the two states in the interwar period and Cold War have been defined by relations between Hungary and Yugoslavia. Both Croatia and Hungary collaborated with the Axis powers in World War II and came under post-war communist party rule. Following the revolutions of 1989 and breakup of Yugoslavia, Hungary recognised Croatian independence with the rest of the European Economic Community in 1992, and supported Croatia during the Croatian War of Independence.

Croatian and Hungarian high-ranking officials usually meet several times a year. Trade between Croatia and Hungary amounted $1.020 bln in 2012, largely consisting of Hungarian exports to Croatia. Hungarian tourists contribute significantly to Croatian tourism; in 2009, a total of 323,000 visited Croatia, including the Hungarian Prime Minister Viktor Orbán who has spent his summer holidays in Dalmatia for last few decades. Both countries coordinate the development of cross-border infrastructure. Pan-European corridors Vb and Vc connect Budapest to the Adriatic Sea via Zagreb and Osijek. Both countries have sizable minorities living across their common border, and both have passed laws to protect their minority rights.

Croatia and Hungary are parties to 96 bilateral treaties and members of a number of multinational organizations, including NATO and the European Union, and the Southeast European Cooperation Initiative. Croatia has an embassy in Budapest a general consulate in Pécs and a consulate in Nagykanizsa, while Hungary has an embassy in Zagreb, a general consulate in Osijek and honorary consulates in Rijeka, Split, and Dubrovnik.

== Present ==
=== Diplomatic relations ===
Croatia and Hungary established diplomatic relations on 16 and 18 January 1992, after Hungary recognised the independence of Croatia on 15 January 1992. As of December 2011, Croatia maintains an embassy in Budapest (headed by ambassador Ivan Bandić), a consulate general in Pécs and a consulate in Nagykanizsa. The Nagykanizsa consulate is led by an honorary consul. Hungary maintains an embassy in Zagreb and consulates in Rijeka and Split. The embassy is headed by ambassador Gábor Iván; the offices also include an army and air attaché office in the Republic of Croatia (headed by László Hajas) and the Office for Economic Affairs of the Embassy of the Republic of Hungary in the Republic of Croatia (headed by András Péter Závoczky, Counselor for Economy and Trade).

Croatian diplomatic missions to Hungary
| Location | Type | Head |
|---|---|---|
| Budapest | embassy | Mladen Andrlić |
| Pécs | consulate | Drago Horvat |
| Nagykanizsa | consulate | Atila Kos |

Hungarian diplomatic missions to Croatia
| Location | Type | Head |
|---|---|---|
| Zagreb | embassy | Csaba Demcsá |
| Rijeka | consulate | Zoran Vukić |
| Osijek | consulate | János Magdó |
| Split | consulate | Ivo Staničić |

==== High level visits ====
Croatian and Hungarian high-ranking officials (including heads of state, prime ministers and foreign ministers) meet several times a year. In addition, Croatian and Hungarian governments have occasionally held joint sessions since January 2006.

High-level visits and meetings (since 2009)
| Date | Location | Note |
|---|---|---|
| 19 June 2012 | Budapest | Speakers of the Croatian Parliament and the National Assembly of Hungary Boris Šprem and László Kövér meet |
| 7 May 2012 | Budapest | Croatian prime minister Zoran Milanović meets Hungarian prime minister Viktor Orbán |
| 24 February 2012 | Budapest | Croatian foreign and European affairs minister Vesna Pusić and János Martonyi (Hungarian foreign minister) meet |
| 7 December 2011 | Olgamajor | Speakers of the Croatian Parliament and the National Assembly of Hungary Luka Bebić and László Kövér meet |
| 29–30 September 2011 | Budapest | President of Croatia Ivo Josipović visits Budapest and meets Hungarian president Pál Schmitt |
| 8 February 2011 | Zagreb | Croatian prime minister Jadranka Kosor meets Hungarian prime minister Viktor Orbán |
| 24 January 2011 | Budapest | Croatian justice minister Dražen Bošnjaković meets Hungarian Administration and Justice minister Tibor Navracsics |
| 23 December 2010 | Zagreb | Croatian prime minister Jadranka Kosor meets Hungarian deputy prime minister Tibor Navracsics |
| 28 October 2010 | Budapest | Gordan Jandroković (Croatian foreign minister) and János Martonyi (Hungarian foreign minister) meet |
| 1 October 2010 | Zagreb | Hungarian president Pál Schmitt meets Croatian president Ivo Josipović and Croatian prime minister Jadranka Kosor, and visits Osijek and Varaždin |
| 10 September 2010 | Zagreb | Croatian prime minister Jadranka Kosor and Hungarian deputy prime minister Tibor Navracsics attend the Consequences of EU Membership for the Judiciary conference |
| 22 July 2010 | Budapest | Hungarian prime minister Viktor Orbán meets Croatian prime minister Jadranka Kosor |
| 13 July 2010 | Zagreb | Croatian prime minister Jadranka Kosor and Gordan Jandroković (Croatian foreign minister) meet Pál Schmitt, Speaker of the National Assembly of Hungary and President-elect of Hungary at the time |
| 9 July 2010 | Dubrovnik | The 5th Croatia Summit is held, attended by Croatian president Ivo Josipović, Croatian prime minister Jadranka Kosor and Hungarian foreign minister János Martonyi |
| 16 April 2010 | Pécs | Trilateral meeting of Croatian, Hungarian and Serbian presidents: Ivo Josipović, László Sólyom and Boris Tadić |
| 16 March 2010 | Budapest | Visit of Croatian president Ivo Josipović |
| 18 January 2010 | Zagreb | Visit of Hungarian prime minister Gordon Bajnai |
| 21 November 2009 | Barcs | Presidents of Croatia and Hungary (Stjepan Mesić and László Sólyom) meet on the occasion of Croatian Day in Hungary |
| 5 November 2009 | Budapest | Presidents Stjepan Mesić and László Sólyom meet at the World Scientific Forum |
| 17 September 2009 | Barcs | Prime ministers Jadranka Kosor and Gordon Bajnai co-chair a joint session of the Government of Croatia and the Government of Hungary |
| 9 September 2009 | Zagreb | Foreign ministers Gordan Jandroković and Péter Balázs meet to prepare a joint session of the Croatian and Hungarian governments |
| 9–10 July 2009 | Dubrovnik | Prime ministers Jadranka Kosor and Gordon Bajnai meet at the Croatia Summit 2009 |
| 27 April 2009 | Luxembourg | Foreign ministers Gordan Jandroković and Péter Balázs meet during the fifth EU-Croatia Stabilisation and Accession Council |
| 13 March 2009 | Zagreb | Hungarian foreign minister Kinga Göncz visits Croatian foreign minister Gordan Jandroković and meets with prime minister Ivo Sanader and president Stjepan Mesić |

=== Economy and infrastructure ===
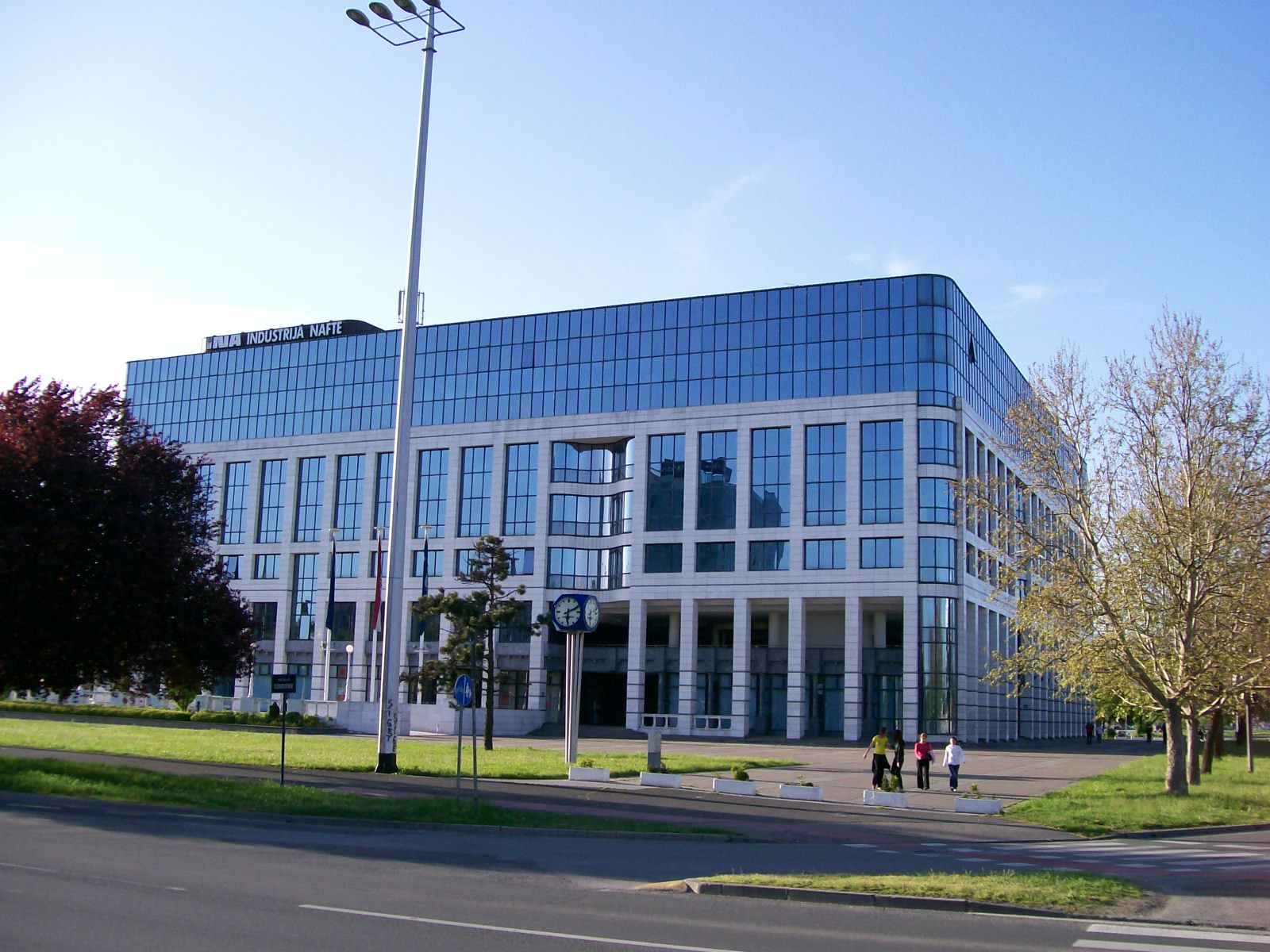
INA headquarters in Zagreb

Trade between Croatia and Hungary amounted to €625,083 in 2009, a decrease from €894,270 in 2008. In 2009 Croatian exports to Hungary reached €132,474, while Hungarian exports to Croatia were worth €492,609. Overall, the 2009 trade volume represented 2.75 percent of total Croatian foreign trade. Croatian–Hungarian trade comprises only a small fraction of total Hungarian foreign trade, reaching 0.54 percent of the total in 2009. Hungarian investments in Croatia rose sharply in 2003, reaching the fourth ranking in that year following investments exceeding US$630 million, largely in tourism and manufacturing. The largest single investment that year was the purchase of more than 25 percent of the stock of INA for US$500 million by the MOL Group. By 2011, the MOL Group increased its stake in INA to 47.16 percent.

Hungarian tourists contribute significantly to the Croatian tourist industry; in 2009, a total of 323,000 Hungarians visited Croatia as tourists. A total of 1.644 million overnight stays were made by Hungarian tourists in that year alone, ranking Hungarian tourists seventh in the number of nights spent in Croatia (behind the Germans, Slovenes, Italians, Austrians, Czechs and Dutch). At the same time, the Hungarian tourists spent more than 143 million kuna (c. €19 million) in Croatia, representing a sharp increase from 69.5 million kuna (c. €9.3 million) spent in 2008. In 2009, 103,000 Croatians visited Hungary (excluding family and friend visits) in 356,000 overnight stays, spending 204,000 kuna (c. €27,000). This spending represented a 250-percent increase from 2008.

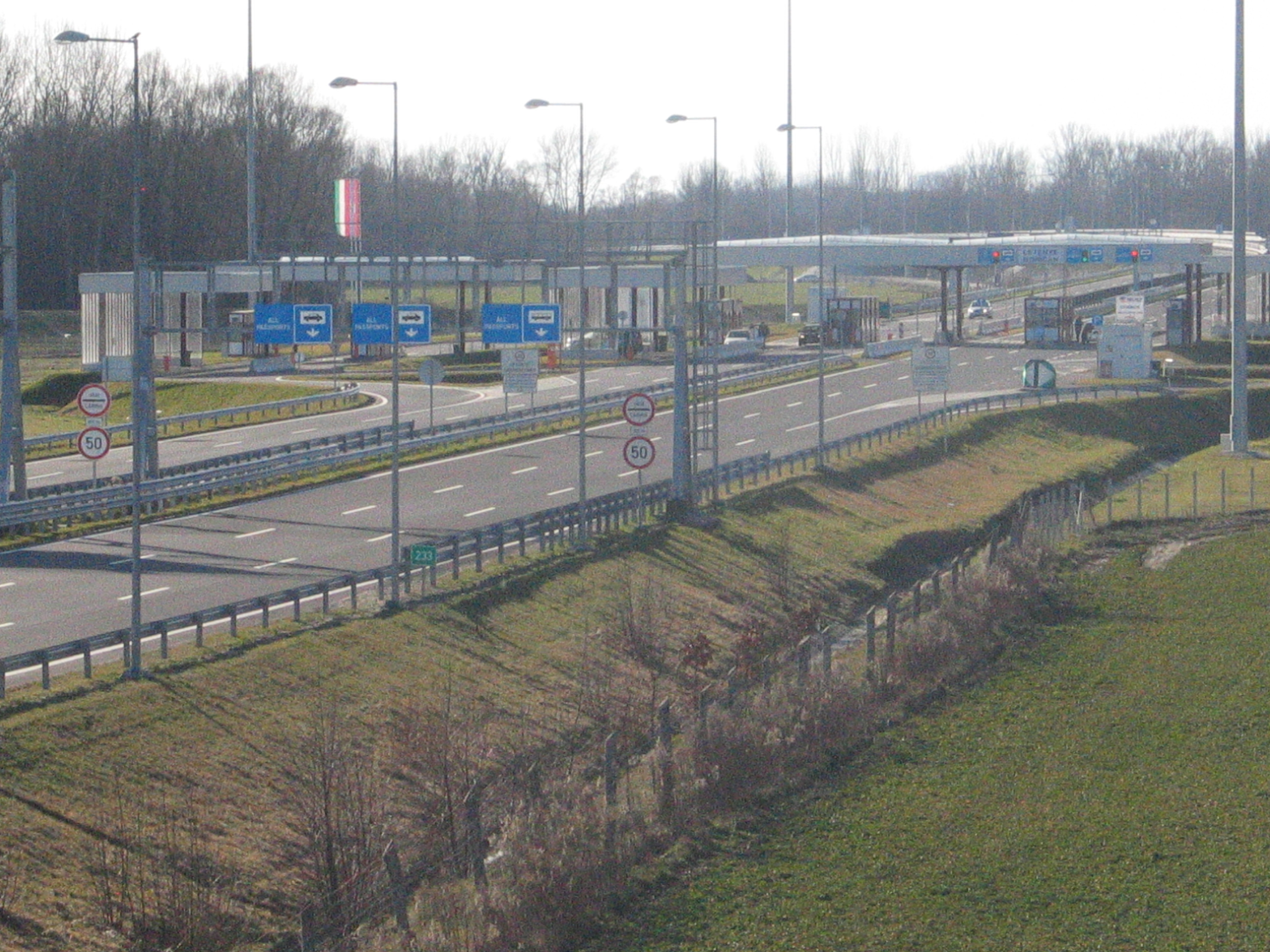
Goričan/Letenye border crossing, adjacent to the Zrinski Bridge on the M7

Croatia and Hungary coordinate the development of infrastructure, especially transportation routes. Pan-European corridors Vb and Vc connect Budapest to the Adriatic Sea via Zagreb and Rijeka (Vb) and to Osijek and Ploče (Vc). The Pan-European corridor Vb comprises road and rail links between the Hungarian and Croatian capitals and the Port of Rijeka. The corridor's road component primarily consists of the M7, the A4 and the A6 motorways (as well as several other connecting motorway sections) completed on 22 October 2008. The rail component of the corridor largely uses the route completed in 1873, but it is planned to be rebuilt to increase its capacity. The Pan-European corridor Vc primarily consists of the M6 and the A5 motorways; however, as of December 2011, the motorway is not completed. Other infrastructure jointly developed by Croatia and Hungary includes a €395 million gas pipeline and two electric-power lines. On the 355.5-kilometre (220.9 mi) border between Croatia and Hungary there are six international-road border crossings, three rail border crossings and five local-traffic border crossings. Both Croatia and Hungary are today members of the border-free Schengen Area.

=== Minorities and migrations ===
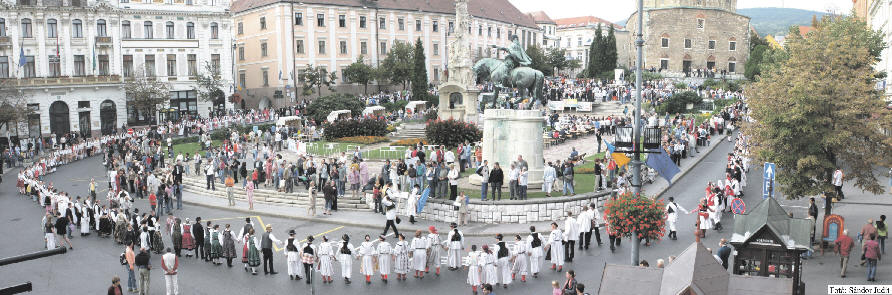
Croats at folklore festival in Pécs

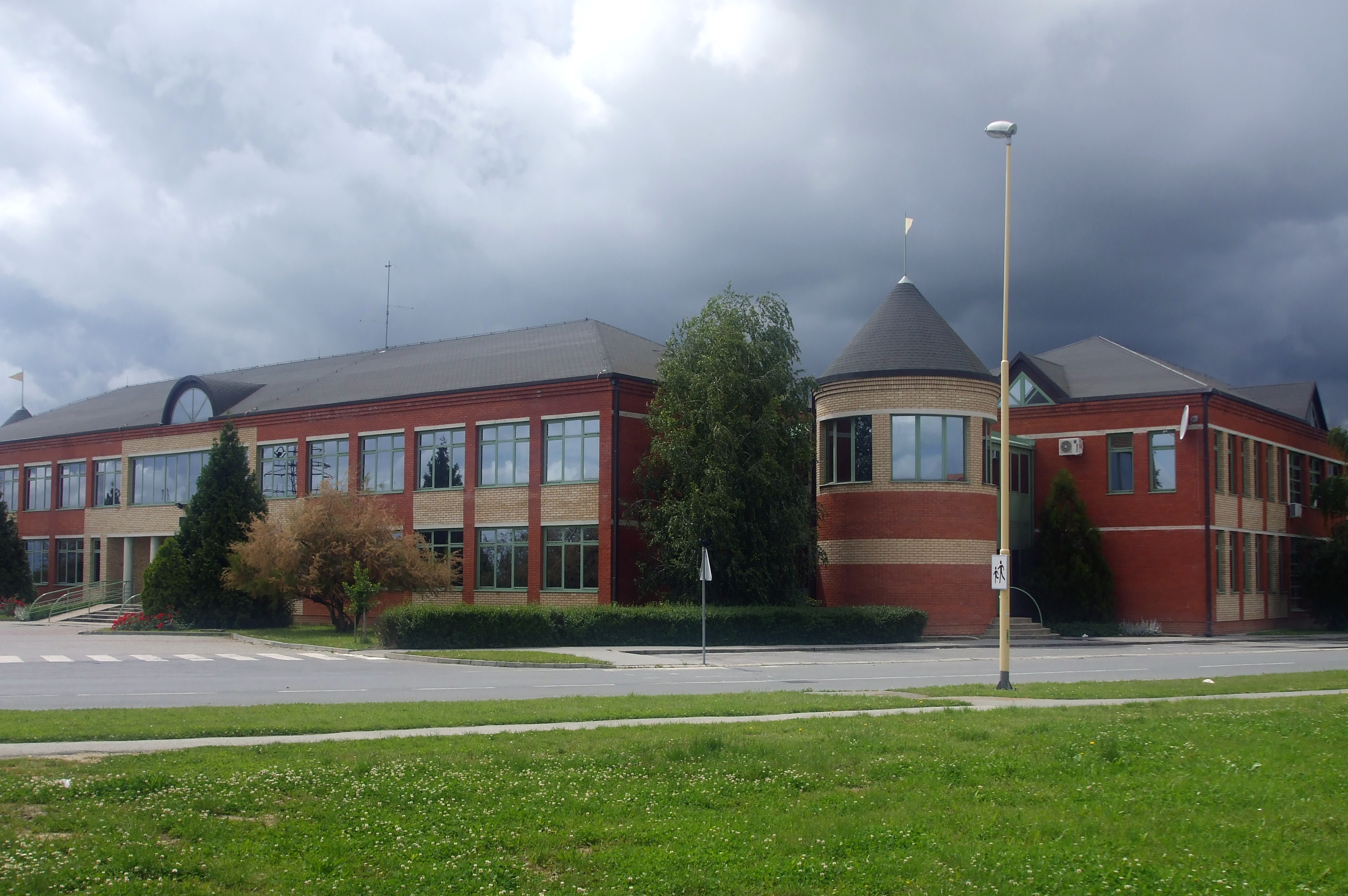
The Educational and Cultural Center of Hungarians in Croatia located in Osijek

According to the 2001 census there are 16,595 Hungarians living in Croatia, representing 0.37 percent of the population. In 2000, there were 15,597 Croats living in Hungary, accounting for 0.15 percent of the total population. The Hungarian minority in Croatia is recognised by the Constitution of Croatia; minority rights (including official use of Hungarian by local governments and education in Hungarian) are safeguarded by legislation enacted by the Sabor. Seven municipalities in Croatia introduced Hungarian for official use (either in part of their territory or the entire municipality), depending on the distribution of the Hungarian population there. There are five Hungarian minority organizations in Croatia, and the Hungarian minority is guaranteed one seat in the Croatian Parliament.

The Hungarian government recognised Croats as a minority native to Hungary; it has decided to implement the optional regulations of the European Charter for Regional or Minority Languages with respect to Croatian and establish a minority self-government for the Croatian minority in Hungary, guaranteeing cultural autonomy. The Croatian minority set up 127 local and 7 county self-governments in Hungary. There are concerns that Croatian minority rights in Hungary are being diminished, but the president of Croatia has assessed that both Croatian and Hungarian minority policies were appropriate. The Croatian minority in Hungary is particularly active in Pécs, where the Scientific Institute of Croats in Hungary and the Croatian Theatre have been established. The number of migrants between Croatia and Hungary is very low; in 2009, only 22 people emigrated from Hungary to Croatia while a single person emigrated from Croatia to Hungary.

=== Cultural and scientific cooperation ===
Croatia and Hungary have agreed to the Cultural Cooperation Programme, which defines cooperation and cultural exchange in the fields of music, theatre and dance, and with respect to the arts, museums, galleries, literature, publishing, libraries, archives, film and cultural-heritage protection. The programme was agreed to on 7 November 2011 in Budapest by secretaries of the Croatian Ministry of Culture and the Hungarian Ministry of National Resources. The programme pertains to the 2012–2014 period and represents a continuation of cultural cooperation through cultural exchange, outside the framework of formal agreements. Cultural, educational and scientific cooperation between the two countries is covered by a treaty of 16 March 1994, with additional treaties regulating diploma recognitions since 16 June 1997 and additional treaties and protocols on scientific and technological cooperation signed in 2002 and 2009. The scientific and educational cooperation entails the awarding of scholarships and bilateral research projects.

Klovićevi dvori Gallery (Zagreb) and Hungarian National Museum (Budapest) organised several joint exhibitions, held in both institutions:

- "Ars et virtus Croatia – Hungary. 800 years of joint cultural heritage" (2020)
- "Ideal and reality: first golden age of Hungarian painting and commencements of the Croatian Modern art" (2024, part of Hungarian presidency of the CEU)

=== Bilateral treaties and multinational organizations ===
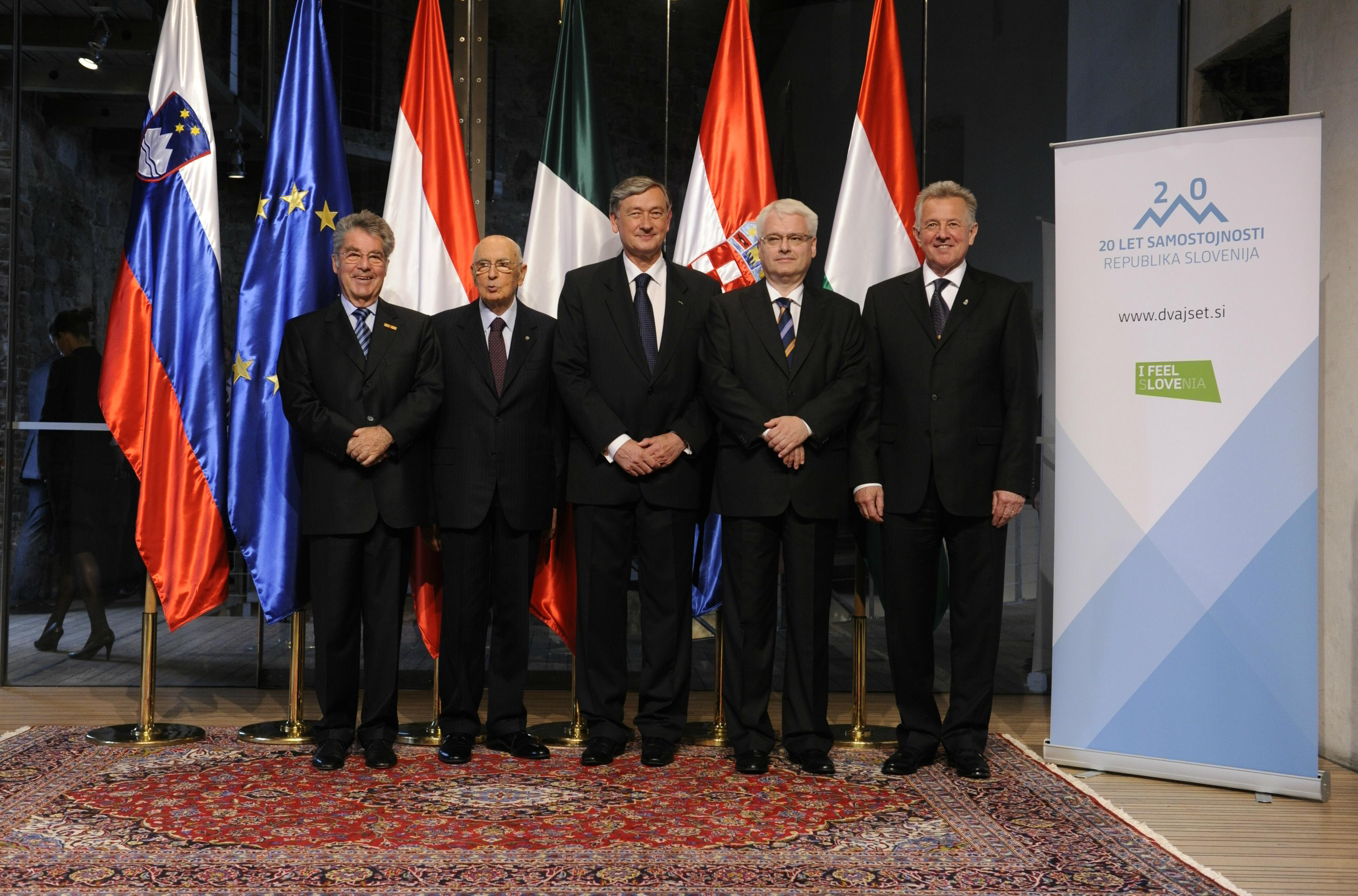
Presidents of Austria, Croatia, Hungary, Italy and Slovenia meeting in 2011

Croatia and Hungary have either signed or succeeded 133 different treaties and other agreements. Some were originally signed by Hungary and SFR Yugoslavia, while Croatia succeeded relevant documents pursuant to decisions of the Badinter Arbitration Committee. As of December 2011, 96 remain in force, regulating various aspects of relations between the countries (including minority rights, diplomatic relations, cultural and scientific cooperation, trade and economic relations, Drava river navigation, border control and air transport). There were also agreements made with a limited period of application, pertaining to sporting-event security.

Croatia and Hungary are members of several multinational organizations, including the United Nations, the Organization for Security and Co-operation in Europe, the Council of Europe, NATO, the World Trade Organization, the Central European Initiative and the European Union. Both countries are also taking part in the formulation and implementation of the Danube Strategy, focusing on transport, environmental and economic development of the Danube area and involving most countries along its banks.

== History ==
=== Personal union ===
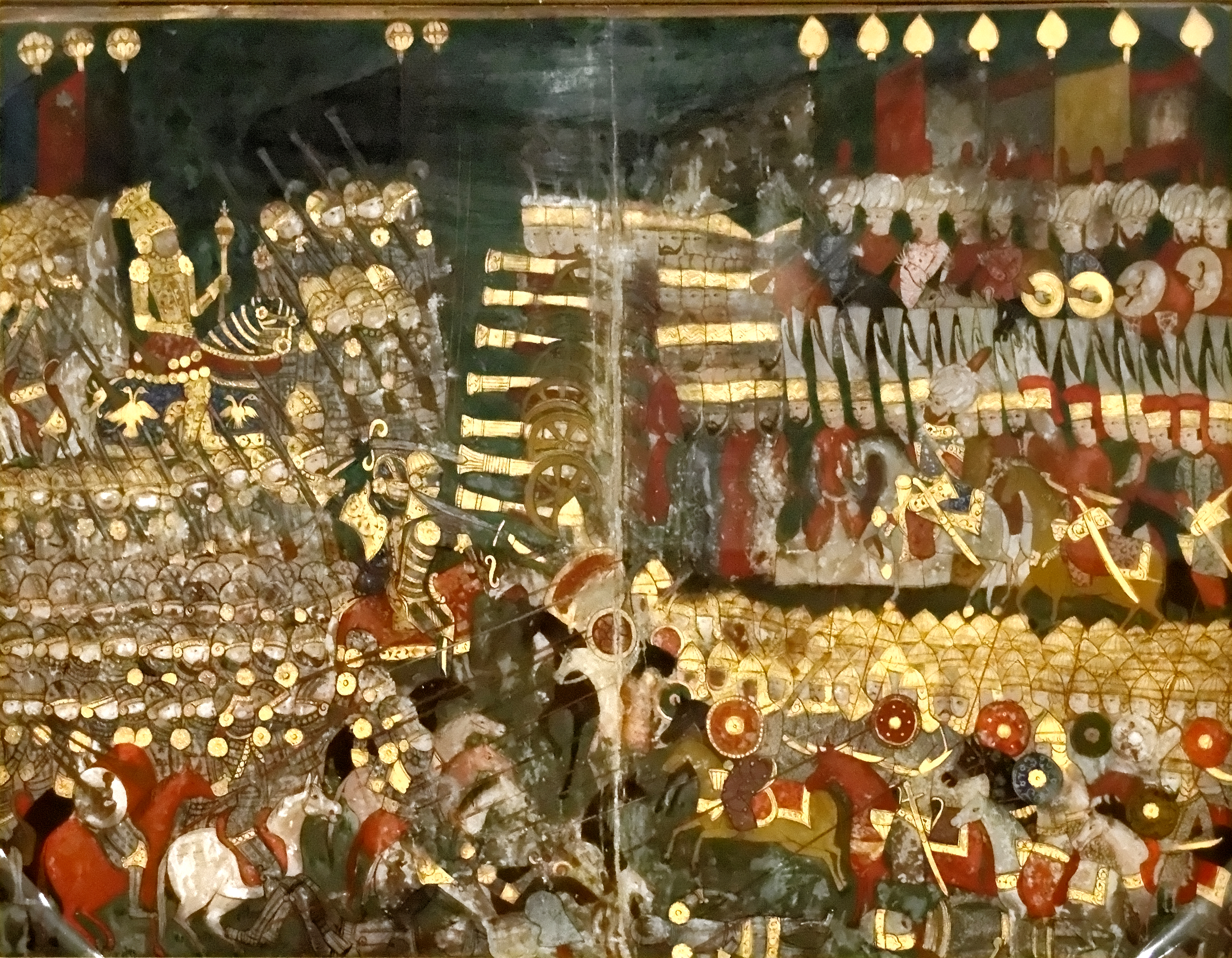
Battle of Mohács in an Ottoman miniature

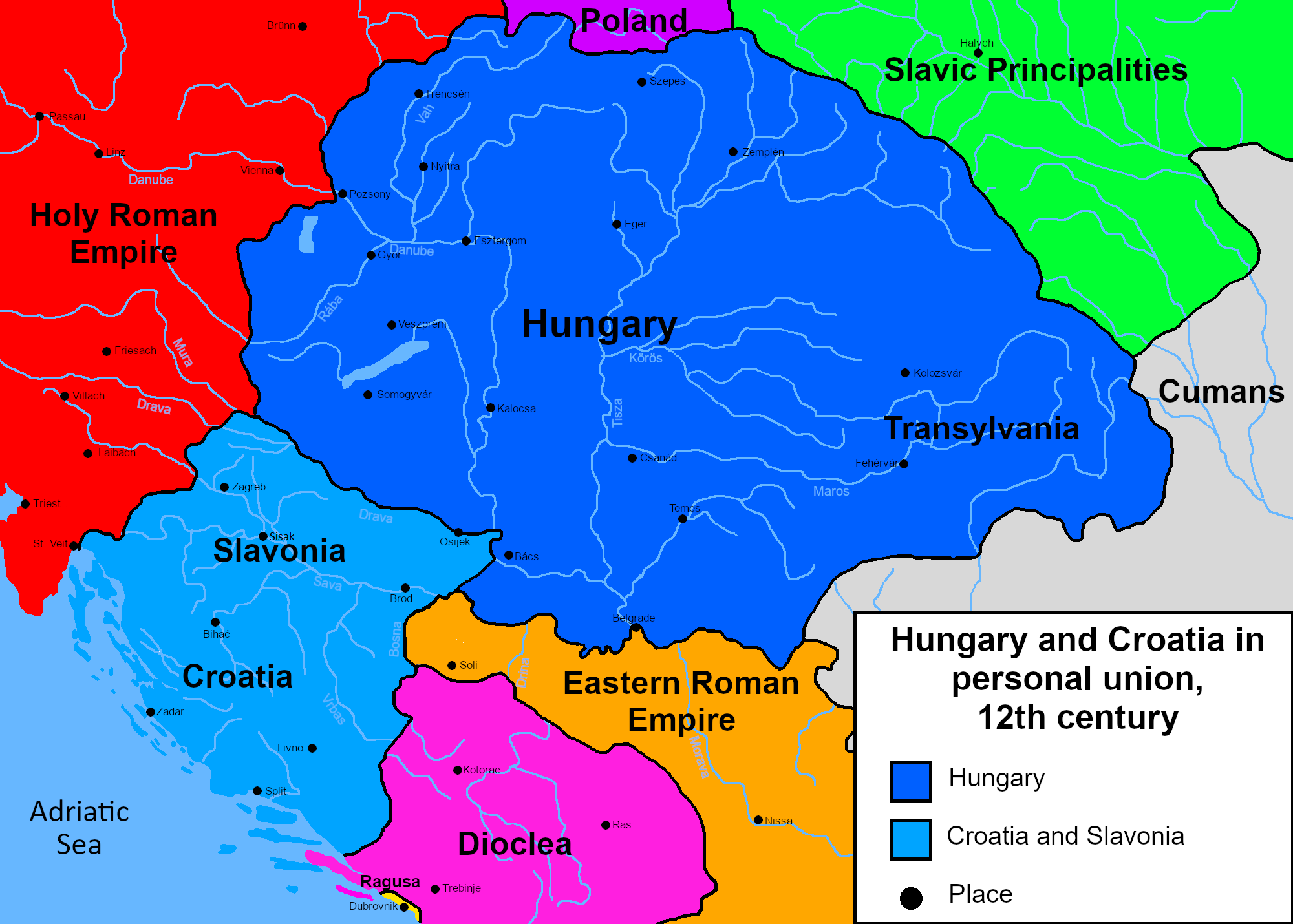
Croatia and Hungary in a personal union

When Stjepan II died in 1091, ending the Trpimirović dynasty rule in the medieval kingdom of Croatia, Ladislaus I of Hungary claimed the Croatian crown. Opposition to the claim led to a war and the personal union of Croatia and Hungary in 1102, ruled by Coloman. For the next four centuries, Croatia was ruled by the Sabor (parliament) and a Ban of Croatia (viceroy) appointed by the king. This period saw an increasing threat of Ottoman conquest and a struggle against the Republic of Venice for control of coastal areas. The Venetians gained control over most of Dalmatia by 1428 except for the city-state of Dubrovnik, which became independent. Ottoman conquests led to the 1493 Battle of Krbava Field and the 1526 Battle of Mohács, both ending in decisive Ottoman victories against Hungarian and Croatian armies. King Louis II died at Mohács; in 1527, the assembly of Croatian nobility meeting at Cetin chose Ferdinand I of Habsburg as the new ruler of Croatia under the conditions that he provide protection to Croatia against the Ottoman Empire and respect its political rights. In political disarray, the divided Hungarian nobility elected two kings simultaneously: János Szapolyai and Ferdinand I. With the conquest of Buda by the Ottomans in 1541, the remaining part of Hungary not ruled by the Ottomans (known as the Royal Hungary) was annexed by the Habsburgs; they ruled as Kings of Hungary, thus keeping the kingdoms of Hungary and Croatia under a single crown.

=== Habsburg rule ===
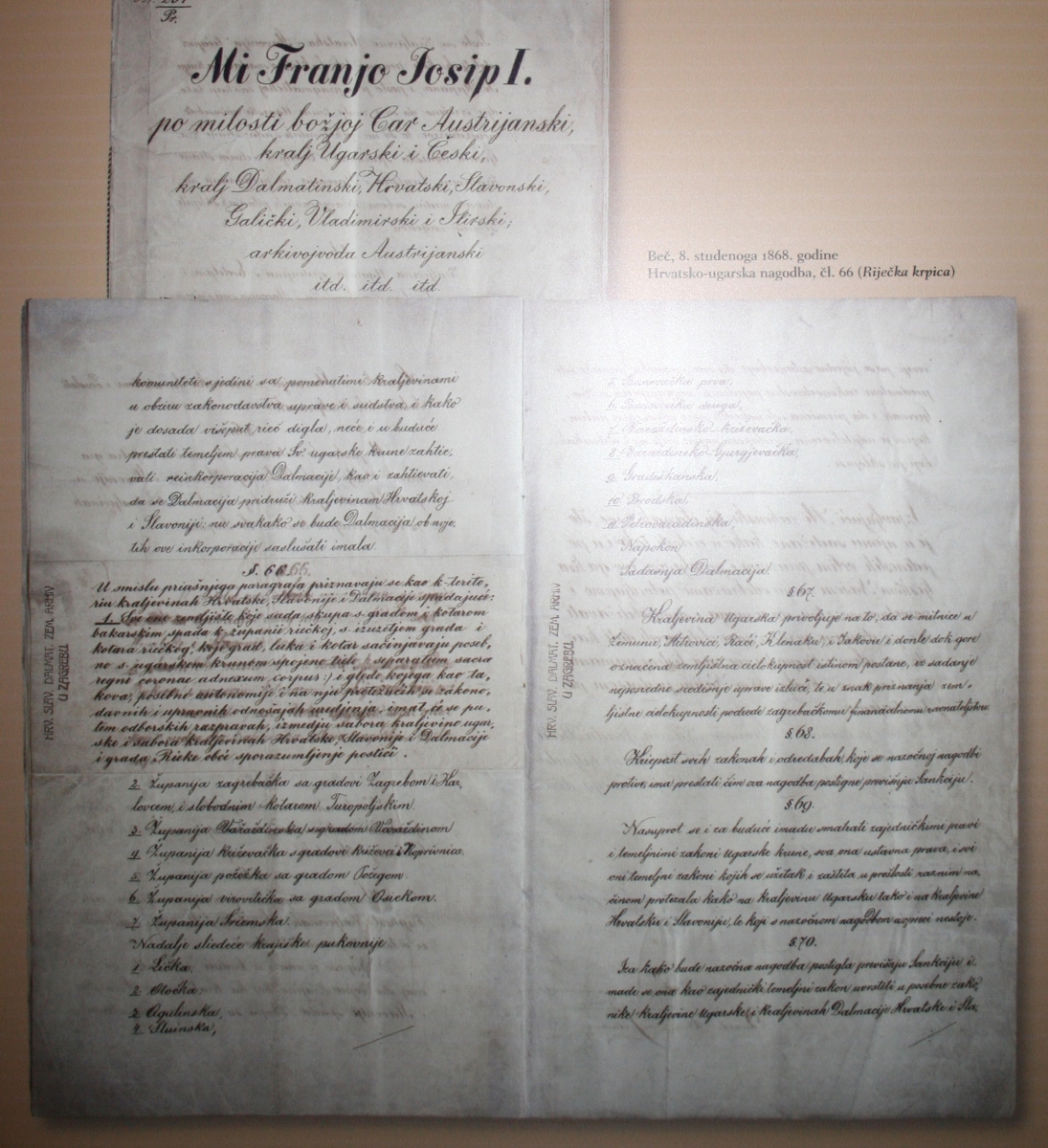
Croatian–Hungarian Settlement of 1868

During the 1830s and 1840s romantic nationalism appeared in Croatia, inspiring the Croatian National Revival (a political and cultural campaign advocating the unity of all South Slavs in the empire). Its primary focus was the establishment of a standard language as a counterweight to Hungarian and the promotion of Croatian literature and culture. During the Hungarian Revolution of 1848, Croatia sided with the Austrians; Ban Josip Jelačić helped defeat the Hungarian forces in 1849, ushering in a period of Germanization. By the 1860s the policy's failure became apparent, leading to the Austro-Hungarian Compromise of 1867 and the creation of a personal union between the crowns of the Austrian Empire and the Kingdom of Hungary. The treaty left the issue of Croatia's status to Hungary; this was resolved by the Croatian–Hungarian Settlement of 1868, when the kingdoms of Croatia and Slavonia were united. The Kingdom of Dalmatia remained under de facto Austrian control, while Rijeka retained its status of Corpus separatum introduced in 1779. After Austria-Hungary occupied Bosnia and Herzegovina following the 1878 Treaty of Berlin, the Croatian Military Frontier was abolished and the territory returned to Croatia in 1881. Renewed efforts to reform Austria-Hungary, entailing federalisation with Croatia as a federal unit, were halted by World War I. On 29 October 1918, the Croatian Sabor declared independence and decided to join the newly formed State of Slovenes, Croats and Serbs, ending Habsburg rule and the personal union with Hungary after 816 years.

=== Treaty of Trianon and World War II ===
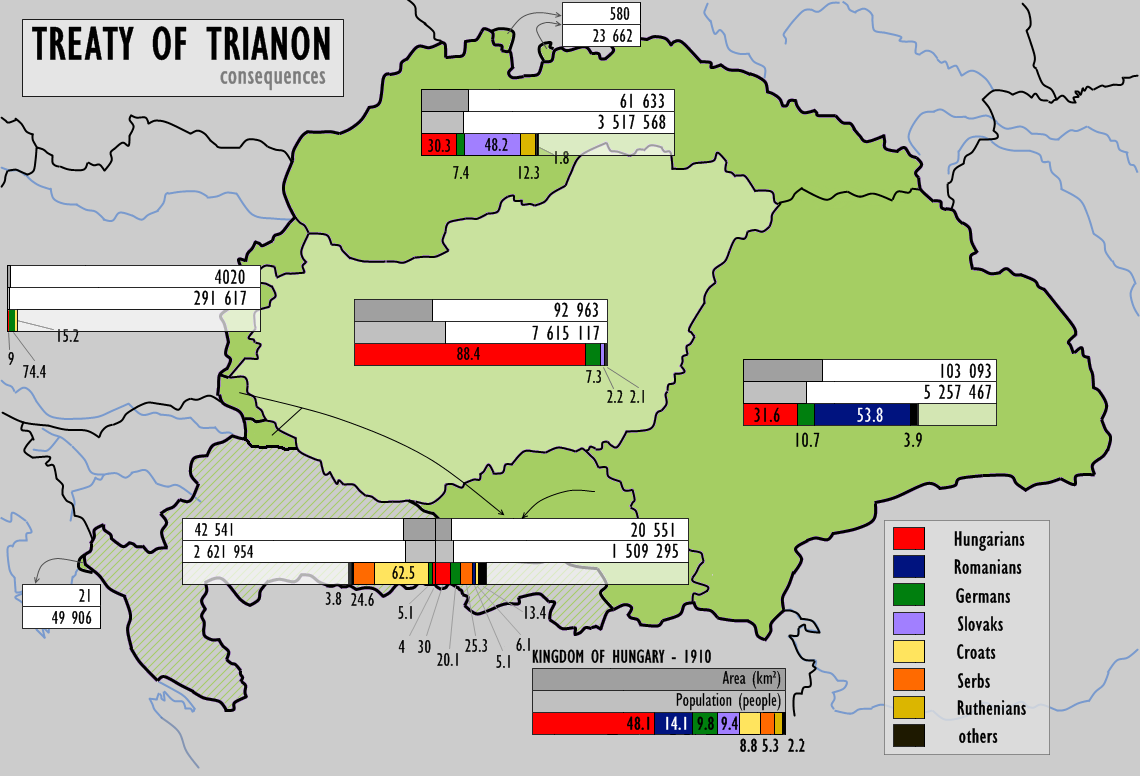
Treaty of Trianon territorial changes

The Treaty of Trianon was signed in 1920, at the end of World War I, between the Allies of World War I and Hungary (as one of the successor states of Austria-Hungary). The treaty regulated the status of the independent Hungarian state and defined its borders. Compared to the prewar Kingdom of Hungary (as a part of Austria-Hungary), post-Trianon Hungary lost 72 percent of its territory. The principal beneficiaries of the territorial division of the prewar Kingdom of Hungary were Romania, Czechoslovakia and the Kingdom of Serbs, Croats and Slovenes. The treaty established the southern border of Hungary along the Drava and Mura rivers (except in Baranya, where only the northern part of the county was retained by Hungary). On 4 December 1918, the State of Slovenes, Croats and Serbs (comprising present-day Croatia) joined the Kingdom of Serbia to form the Kingdom of Serbs, Croats, and Slovenes.

The invasion of Yugoslavia by the Axis Powers began on 6 April 1941, during World War II, and ended with the unconditional surrender of the Royal Yugoslav Army on 17 April 1941. During that time, a genocide of Serbs happened. Many Jews and Roma people were murdered too. Also, during that time, on 12 April the Hungarian Third Army crossed the border (advancing into Međimurje and southern Baranya). Those territorial gains were reversed by Yugoslav partisans and the Red Army in 1944 and 1945, and confirmed by the Paris Peace Treaties of 1947. As World War II was replaced by the Cold War, Hungarian–Croatian relations were substantially dictated by the Soviet Union; it dominated the Eastern Bloc, which included Hungary and Communist-ruled Yugoslavia (which in turn comprised Croatia as its constituent part), as defined by the Tito–Stalin split. This situation ended with the revolutions of 1989, the end of Communism in Hungary and the breakup of Yugoslavia.

=== Fall of Communism and Croatian independence ===
Hungary recognised Croatian independence on 15 January 1992 (with the rest of the European Economic Community member states), and established diplomatic relations with Croatia three days later. During the Croatian War of Independence, Croatia obtained arms from several countries (including Hungary), despite a United Nations-imposed arms embargo. As of December 2011, Hungary and Croatia have 96 treaties and agreements in force regulating a wide range of activities and relations (including diplomatic, cultural, economic, energy, transport, education, minority and other issues). Furthermore, Hungary supported the Croatian NATO membership request and Croatian accession to the European Union.

== Economic links ==
Export and import from Hungary to Croatia
| Million (€) | 2012 | 2013 | 2014 | 2015 |
|---|---|---|---|---|
| Export | 1,266.71 | 1,115.98 ▼ | 1,188.7 ▲ | 1,491.1 ▲ |
| Import | 341.77 | 340.19 ▼ | 419.76 ▲ | 439.02 ▲ |
| Balance | 924.95 | 775.78 | 768.97 | 1,052.13 |

== the European Union and NATO ==
Hungary joined the EU in 2004. Croatia joined the EU in 2013. Hungary joined NATO in 1999. Croatia joined NATO in 2009.

== Resident diplomatic missions ==
- Croatia has an embassy in Budapest and a consulate-general in Pécs.
- Hungary has an embassy in Zagreb and a consulate-general in Osijek.
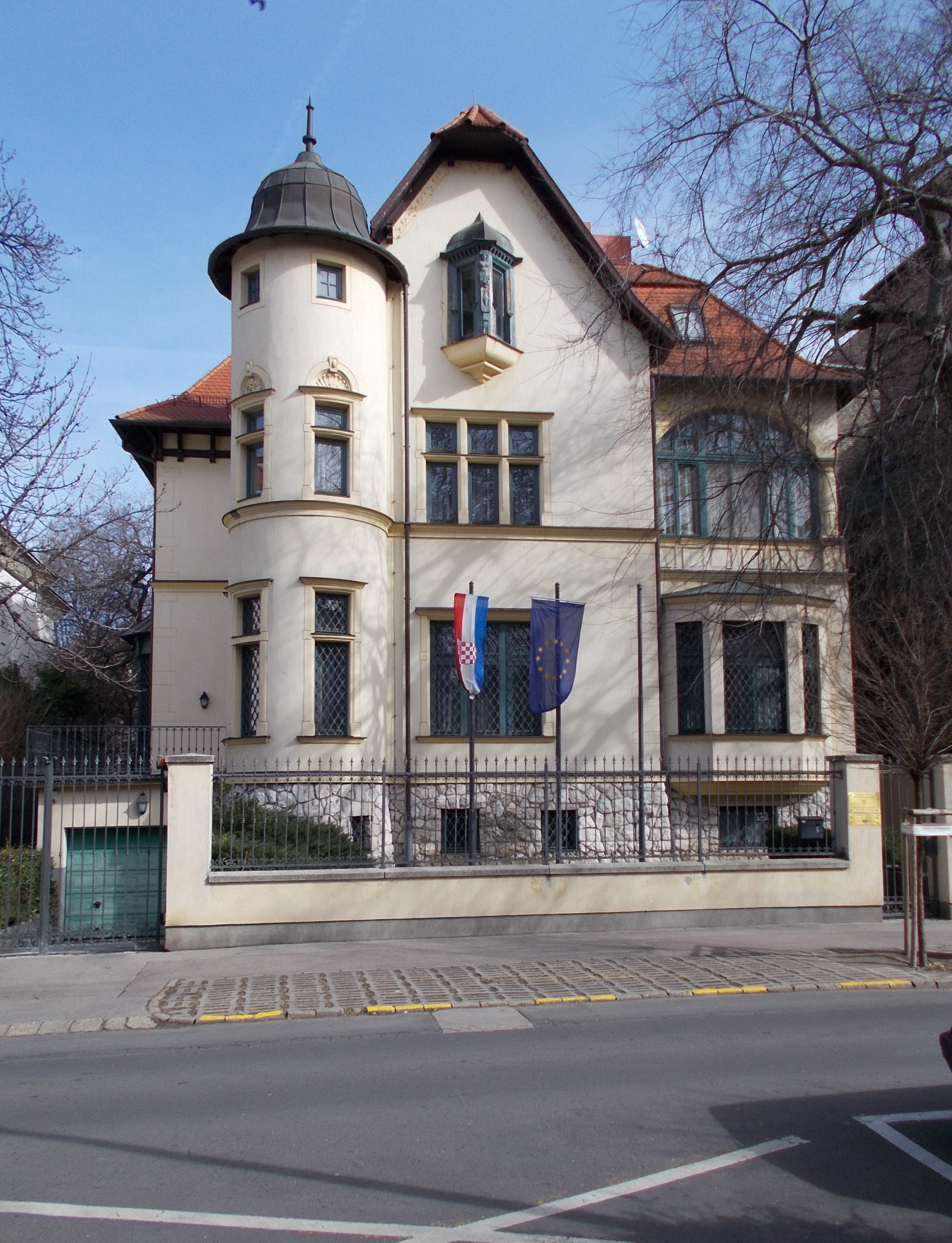
Embassy of Croatia in Budapest

== See also ==
- Foreign relations of Croatia
- Foreign relations of Hungary
- Hungarians of Croatia
- Croats of Hungary
- Hungary–Yugoslavia relations
