= Masłów =

Masłów may refer to:

- Masłów, Lower Silesian Voivodeship, a village in south-west Poland
- Masłów, Świętokrzyskie Voivodeship, a village in south-central Poland
- Gmina Masłów, an administrative district in south-central Poland
- Masłów Drugi, a village in Gmina Masłów

== See also ==
- Maslov, a surname
- Maslow (disambiguation)
