= Maslo =

Maslo is a surname. Notable people with the surname include:

- Ján Maslo (born 1986), Slovak footballer
- Peter Maslo (born 1987), Slovak footballer
- Uli Maslo (born 1938), German footballer and manager

== See also ==
- Maslov
- Maslow (disambiguation)
