= Danube Strategy of the European Union =

The Danube Strategy of the European Union aimed at closer cooperation between the states along the Danube. The focus is on the areas of infrastructure, environmental protection, wealth creation and good governance.

== History of the Danube Strategy ==
The original initiative for a Danube strategy came from the European Commission. At a conference in Brussels in October 2008, to which the state of Baden-Württemberg and Prime Minister Günther Oettinger had invited, the then Commissioner for Regional Policy Danuta Hübner called for "a specific strategy comparable to the one we are developing for the Baltic Sea region". The focus should be "ecology, traffic and socio-economic issues". In connection with the formulation of the Baltic Sea Strategy in the first half of 2009, the Council of the European Union asked at its meeting in Brussels on 18./19. June 2009 the commission to present an EU strategy for the Danube region by the end of 2010. The Committee of the Regions agreed on 7 October 2009. The committee suggested the expansion of the transport infrastructure, cross-border cooperation in flood protection, joint tourism concepts and regional cultural work as the focal points of the strategy. In particular, the "cultural bridging function of cities and municipalities" was emphasized.

On January 21, 2010, the European Parliament also passed a resolution on a European strategy for the Danube region. It emphasized the role model function of the Baltic Sea strategy and referred to the long tradition of cooperation in the Danube region, which goes back to the European Danube Commission founded in 1856. At the same time, it made it clear that, given the fact that not all countries in the Danube region are members of the EU, the Danube Strategy is an important hub between cohesion policy and the European neighborhood policy. By understanding the Danube region as a macro-region, the regional differences in economic output could be overcome. Specifically, the strategy should include the following elements: environmental protection, improvement of infrastructure, improvement of water quality, safety of shipping traffic, tourism as well as education, research and social cohesion. In addition, academic exchange and cultural dialogue should be promoted.

Based on the resolution of the European Parliament, the Commission published a framework paper on February 2, 2010, in which it called on all stakeholders - Member States, neighboring countries, regions, municipalities, international organizations, social partners and civil society - to participate. In it, she divided the aspects of the Danube Strategy into the following points: improving accessibility and communication systems, protecting the environment and improving water quality, and strengthening socio-economic, human and institutional development. Following the consultation, on December 8, 2010, the Commission presented its proposal for an EU strategy in the Danube region. This was approved on April 13, 2011, by the EU member states, which can now start implementing the strategy.

== Participants ==
Nine EU member states are involved in the work of the Danube Strategy:

- Austria
- Bulgaria
- Germany (Baden-Württemberg and Bavaria)
- Romania
- Slovakia
- Slovenia
- Hungary
- Croatia
- Czech Republic

and five non-EU countries:

- Bosnia and Herzegovina
- Moldova
- Serbia
- Ukraine (Odesa, Chernivtsi, Ivano-Frankivsk and Zakarpattia oblasts)
- Montenegro

== Danube Strategy and Ukraine ==
The Ukrainian part of the Danube region covers an area of 68.1 thousand square kilometers, with a total population of 5.9 million people and is represented by four areas, partly located in the Danube basin.

All regions are border, have significant climatic and landscape features, are characterized by the presence of compact ethnic enclaves.

In order to strengthen the economic, scientific, technical, investment, tourism and cultural potential of the Ukrainian regions along the Danube, a Memorandum of Cooperation was signed within the framework of the EU Strategy for the Danube Region.

On January 30, 2013, the First Deputy Minister of Economic Development and Trade of Ukraine Anatoliy Maksyuta was appointed as the coordinator of Ukraine's activities in the implementation of the EU Strategy for the Danube Region.

Since 2015, they have been actively involved in European integration processes, cross-border and regional programs as partners in the Association of Ukrainian Regions "EU Strategy for the Danube Region" (President – Yuriy Maslov).

In 2017, the Odesa Oblast Council approved a Perspective Action Plan for the implementation of the EU Strategy for the Danube Region in the Odesa region.

In order to timely identify and solve environmental problems in the Danube basin and adjacent territories and reservoirs, to achieve a safe state of the environment by monitoring the state of water, soil and air, the Center for Sustainable Development and Environmental Research of the Danube region was established.

On July 9, 2019, the Association of Amalgamated Territorial Communities and the Association of Ukrainian Regions "EU Strategy for the Danube Region" signed a memorandum of cooperation.

== Focus ==
The EU strategy for the Danube region consists of the four pillars “Connecting the Danube Region”, “Environmental Protection in the Danube Region”, “Building Prosperity in the Danube Region” and “Strengthening the Danube Region”. These four pillars are further subdivided into eleven priority areas. [8] On February 3, 2011, EU Regional Commissioner Johannes Hahn, together with Hungarian Foreign Minister János Martonyi, announced coordinators for the eleven thematic priorities of the EU strategy for the Danube region. The thematic priorities include, among others. promoting the use of sustainable energies, promoting culture and tourism, improving institutional capacity and cooperation.

== Infrastructure ==
Above all, this includes improving the connection to the Danube region by improving mobility, promoting the use of sustainable energies and promoting culture and tourism. In the area of transport, inland shipping is to be strengthened and road, rail and air transport infrastructures improved. In addition, the energy infrastructure is to be modernized. In the field of culture and tourism, a common and sustainable concept for the upgrading and promotion of the Danube region is to be created.

== Environmental Protection ==
This concerns, on the one hand, ensuring good water quality in accordance with the EU Water Framework Directive and, on the other hand, disaster prevention and management measures in accordance with the Flood Directive, the Seveso Directive, the Mining Waste Directive and the Environmental Liability Directive. In addition, there is the preservation of biological diversity and nature reserves.

== Wealth creation ==
This area includes investments in education and job qualifications, research and innovation as well as the targeted promotion of companies through better networking and the establishment of so-called "centers of excellence." It also takes into consideration alleviating poverty and the creation of jobs.

== Good governance ==
This includes the exchange of experiences on good administrative practice and the fight against corruption, organized and serious crime.

== Sources ==
- Авторський колектив під загальною редакцією І. В. Студеннікова. Комплексне бачення участі України в реалізації Стратегії ЄС для Дунайського регіону. — Одеса, 2015. — 154 с.
- Васюченок, Л. П. Дунайская стратегия как институциональный механизм развития кооперации (Наука – образованию, производству, экономике: материалы 15-й Международной научно-технической конференции). — Мінськ : БНТУ, 2017. — Т. 4. — С. 74-75.
- EU Strategy for the Danube Region
- (serb.)
- Danube Civil Society Forum
- Єврокомісар Ган називає координаторів пріоритетних напрямків Стратегії ЄС для Дунайського регіону
- Стратегія(rus.) на сайті Дунайської комісії
- Стратегія ЄС стосовно Дунайського регіону на сайті Європейської комісії
- Європейська стратегія розвитку Дунайського регіону. Глосарій термінів
- Українська делегація взяла участь у Конференції з Дунайського регіону
- Стратегія екологічна // Словник-довідник з екології : навч.-метод. посіб. / уклад. О. Г. Лановенко, О. О. Остапішина. — Херсон : ПП Вишемирський В. С., 2013. — С. 165.
