= Maslow =

Maslow may refer to:

- Maslov, alternative translation of the Russian surname
- Masłów (disambiguation), a Polish place-name
- Maslow CNC, an open-source CNC router project
- Maslow Entertainment, an Australian film distribution and production development company

== See also ==
- Maslo, a surname
- Maslow's hammer
- Maslow's hierarchy of needs
