= Hungary–Serbia relations =

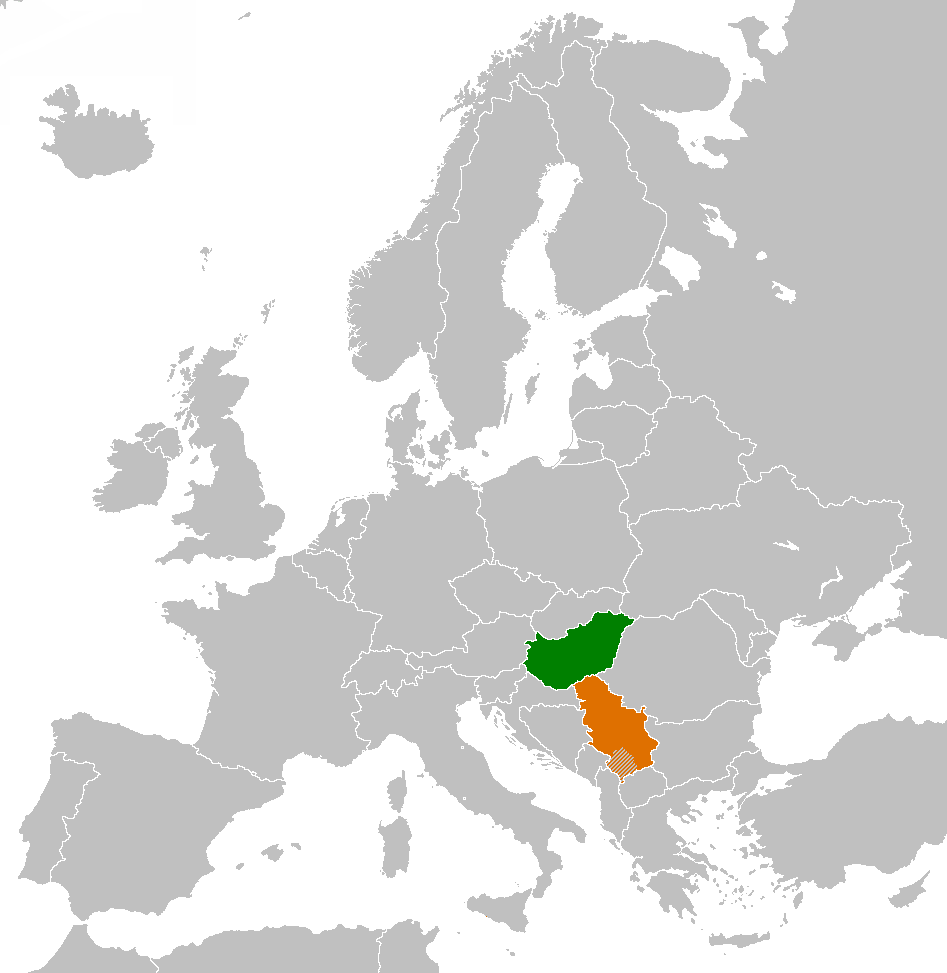

- Hungary: Serbia

Hungary and Serbia maintain diplomatic relations established between Hungary and the Kingdom of Yugoslavia in 1921. From 1921 to 2006, Hungary maintained relations with the Kingdom of Yugoslavia, the Socialist Federal Republic of Yugoslavia (SFRY), and the Federal Republic of Yugoslavia (FRY) (later Serbia and Montenegro), of which Serbia is considered shared (SFRY) or sole (FRY) legal successor.

== History ==
Hungary and Serbia share deep historical ties that have been characterized by periods of cooperation and conflict. Contacts begin with the immigration of Hungarian tribes to the Carpathian Basin around the 10th century. The first serious ties between Serbs and Hungarians came with the formation of the medieval Kingdom of Serbia and the Kingdom of Hungary. Daughter of Serbian ruler Uroš I Jelena married the son and heir of Stephen II around 1130 while marking the first dynastic marriage between the ruling families of the two countries.

Later, the Hungarian princess Catherine became the wife of King Stefan Dragutin, while his brother, the later King Stefan Milutin, married the Hungarian princess Elizabeth. Serbian Prince Stefan Lazarević had a great alliance with King Sigismund of Luxembourg and formed the knightly Order of the Dragon. He also received Belgrade as a gift in 1403, which then became the Serbian capital for the first time. During the defense against Turkish attacks, especially during the siege of Belgrade in 1456, the Hungarian hero John Hunyadi stood out, who is mentioned in many Serbian epic poems as Sibinjanin Janko. King Matthias Corvinus was a great friend of the Serbs and helped the Serbian states in their defense against the Turkish invasion. After the fall of Smederevo in 1459, he accepted thousands of Serbian refugees into Hungary and allowed the descendants of Đurađ Branković to bear the title of despot while fighting under the Hungarian flag. One of them was the famous Black Army commander Vuk Grgurević-Branković, known as Vuk the Fiery Dragon, a friend of Matthias Corvinus who conquered Sarajevo and brought thousands of Serbian refugees from Bosnia to Syrmia. Hungarian and Serbian refugees fled from Ottoman occupations, and used to be part of the famous Winged Hussars, a military regiment of the previous Polish–Lithuanian Commonwealth.

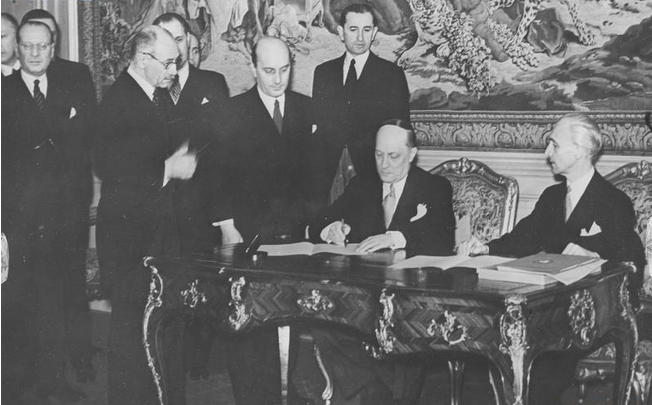
Foreign Ministers Aleksandar Cincar-Marković and László Bárdossy signing the Treaty of Eternal Friendship between Yugoslavia and Hungary, 1940

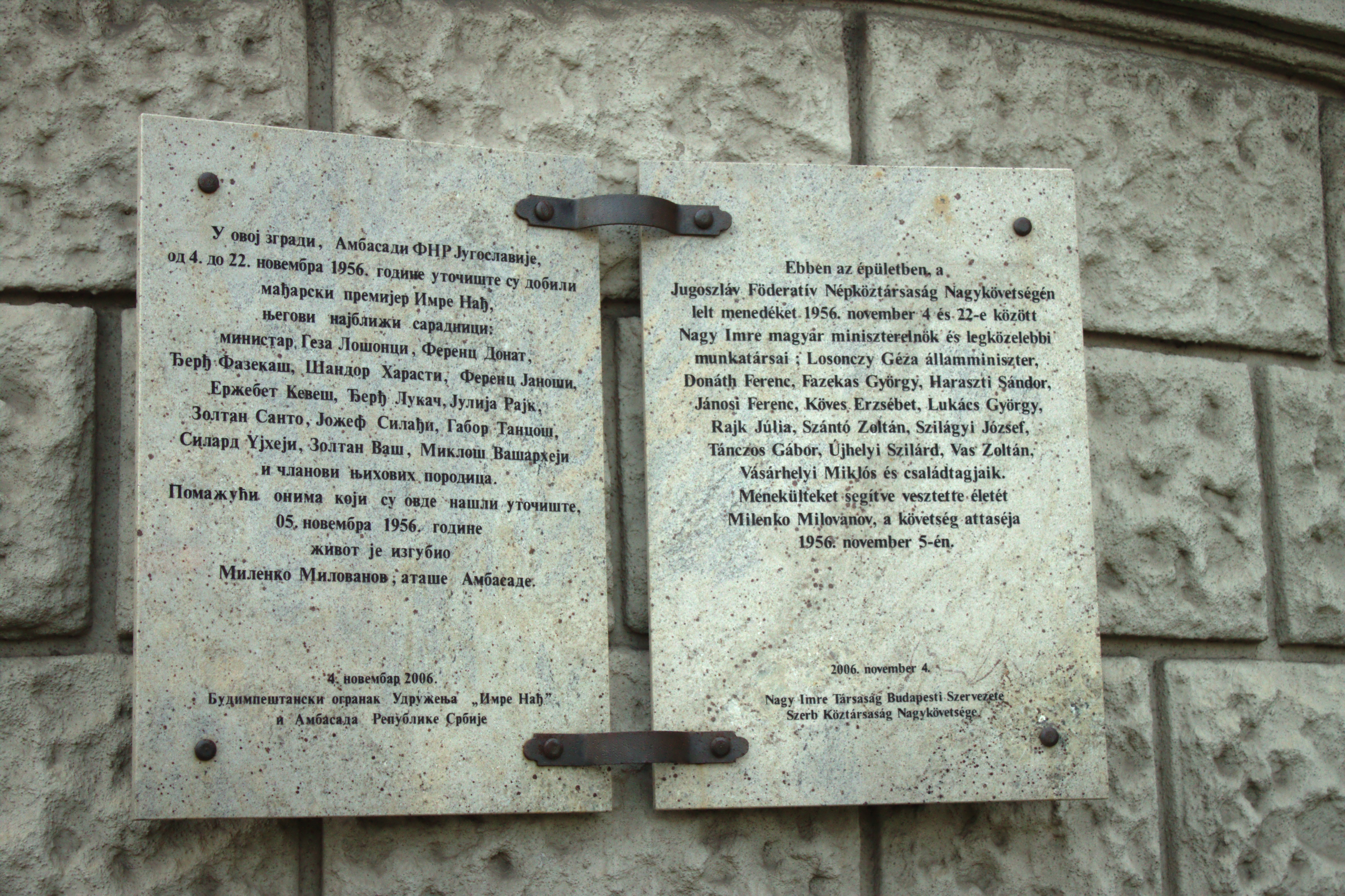
Memorial plaque at the Embassy of Serbia in Budapest, in memory of Imre Nagy who found a sanctuary there during the Hungarian Revolution of 1956

However, relationship between two states turned tense in the later half of the 19th century, with the establishment of the Kingdom of Serbia and Serbian interests toward Bosnia and Herzegovina and Vojvodina, both having significant Serbian population. As part of Austria-Hungary, the Hungarian army took a significant part of the invading army on Serbia at the World War I. After the war, Hungary lost Vojvodina, a former territory of the Kingdom of Hungary, to Serbia.

Hungary signed a Non-aggression Treaty and Treaty of Eternal Friendship with Yugoslavia in 1940. However, Hungary participated in the Axis invasion on Yugoslavia which prompted the then Prime Minister of Hungary Pál Teleki to commit suicide. In the communist era, Yugoslavia's Josip Broz Tito was against the Hungarian Revolution of 1956 and supportive of Soviet military uses against Hungarians; but the suppression of Hungarian protesters by Soviet army might have influenced Tito's decision to change against the Soviets at the Prague Spring a decade later.

The relationship between Serbia and Hungary went downhill in the 1990s, when Yugoslavia started to disintegrate. Hungary was one of the earliest supporters of newly independent Croatia and allowed Croats to supply weapons through its territory. However, during the NATO-led bombing of Serbia, Hungary under Prime Minister Viktor Orbán refused the requests of the United States and Great Britain to invade the north of Serbia in order to hinder the intervention of Serbian forces in Kosovo but expressed concern about the situation of the Hungarian minority in Serbia and had to cede airspace to NATO forces because it got membership in NATO before the war. Several protests against the bombing were also organized in Budapest. Therefore, relations between the two countries slowly improved in the post-war period. During the premiership of Ferenc Gyurcsány, the relations continued to worsen, with Hungary being one of the earliest nations in the world to recognize Kosovo as an independent state.

In 2013, a historical reconciliation was marked after decades of tensions between two countries. The President of Hungary, János Áder gave a speech in front of the Serbian National Assembly where he issued an official apology for the Hungarian role in the World War II persecution of Serbs such as Novi Sad raid. In turn, in 2014 the Serbian National Assembly symbolically voided Yugoslav laws on collective guilt of Hungarian people for crimes committed during World War II.

== Political relations ==
Hungary (along with Greece, Slovakia and Romania) is considered one of the closest allies of Serbia in the European Union, while Serbia is one of Hungary's closest allies in foreign policies.

Although it recognizes Kosovo's independence, in many cases Hungary was on the Serbian side when issue of Kosovo was discussed, e.g. it voted against Kosovo's membership in the Council of Europe in 2023.

In 2024, Hungary was the only EU member state to vote against a UN resolution recognizing the 11 July 1995 Srebrenica massacre as a genocide, effectively siding with Serbia.

Neither Hungary nor Serbia have joined the sanctions against Russia following the 2022 Russian invasion of Ukraine, with the exception of those Hungary had to adopt as a member of the European Union. Both countries have been vocally against restricting Russian gas imports, and as a consequence have also suffered a deterioration in relations with Ukraine.

In recent years Hungary has been viewed positively in Serbia. According to recent polls, Serbs consider Hungary to be their closest ally in the European Union. Among the neighboring countries, Hungary is viewed the most positive by Serbs.

== Economic relations ==
Trade between two countries amounted to $3.3 billion in 2023; Hungary's merchandise export to Serbia was over $1.6 billion; Serbian exports were roughly the same standing at $1.6 billion.

Hungarian companies have been active on Serbian market. OTP Bank is the second-largest bank in Serbia. MOL has the retail network of 71 filling stations in Serbia. Hungarian manufacturing companies present in Serbia include Masterplast (building materials plant in Subotica), Tisza Automotive (automotive parts plant in Senta and Kikinda), UBM (animal feedingstuffs plant in Šid).

Recently, there were several infrastructure projects connecting two countries: high-speed Budapest–Belgrade railway (completed in 2026), extension of the Balkan Stream natural gas pipeline (completed in 2021); currently ongoing projects include crude oil pipeline between Algyő and Novi Sad with capacity of 5 million TOE (due to be completed by 2028) as well as additional high-voltage electricity transmission line (due to be completed by late 2020s).

== Hungarians in Serbia ==
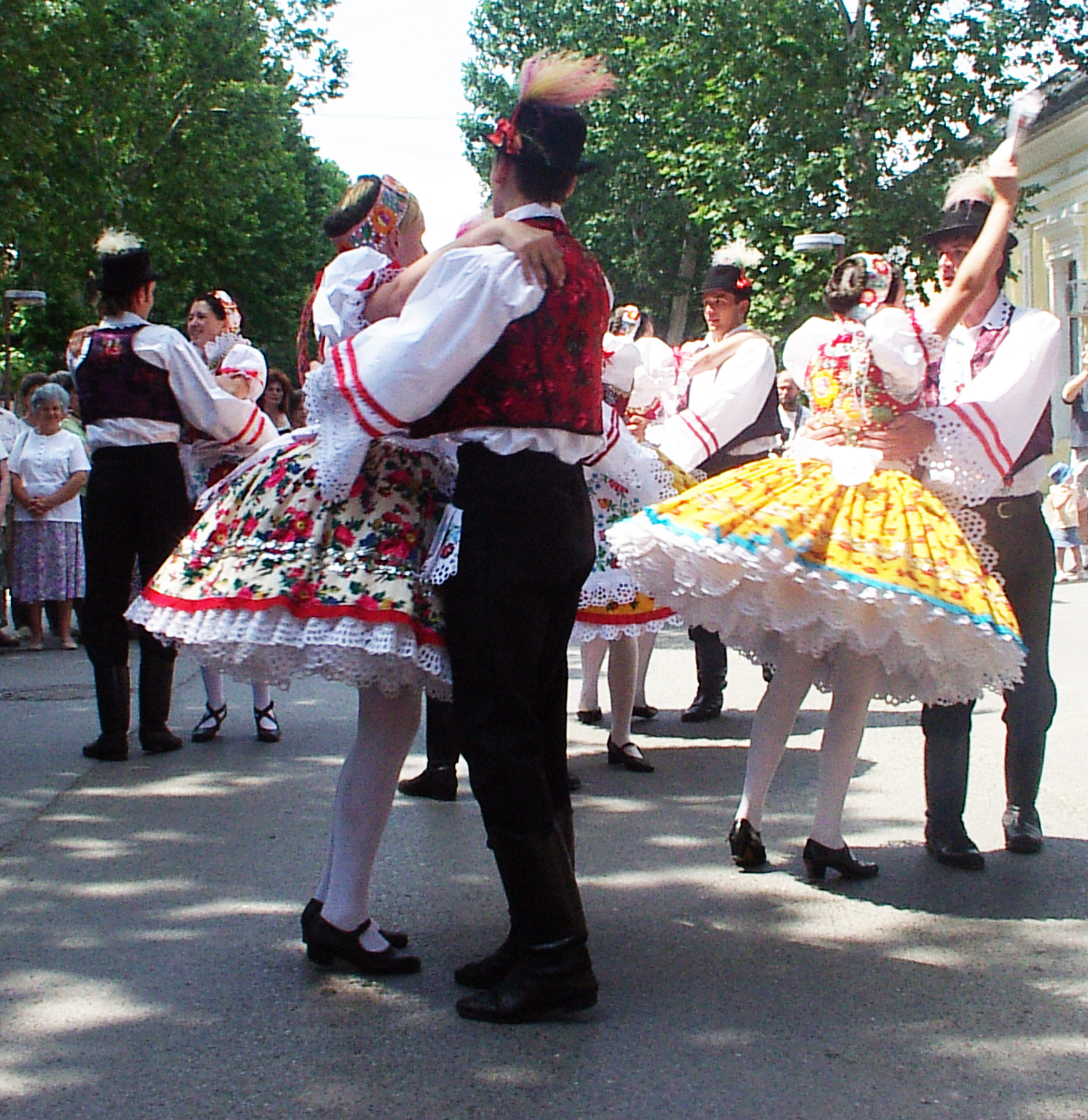
Csárdás folk dance in Doroslovo

Hungarians in Serbia are a recognized ethnic minority group. They number 184,442, constituting 2.8% of the total population, which makes them the largest ethnic minority group in the country. The vast majority of Hungarians in Serbia live in the northern part of Vojvodina province, where they make up 10.5% of provincial population. Hungarians of Roman Catholic faith originated mostly from Dunántúl, while Hungarians of Protestant faith originated mostly from Alföld.

Parts of today's Vojvodina were included into the medieval Kingdom of Hungary in the 10th century, and Hungarians then began to settle in the region. Until the 16th century, Hungarians formed the largest part of population in today's Vojvodina. After the Ottoman conquest of Hungary, the region was devastated by the conquerors, the population were killed, or fled. Hungarians started to settle back to the territory after the Ottomans were driven out in the late 17th and early 18th centuries. Hungarian colonists settled in Bačka throughout the 18th century and by the 19th century, their colonization increased. The first Hungarian settlers in Syrmia moved there during the 1860s, mainly from Bačka.

== Serbs in Hungary ==
Serbs are a recognized ethnic minority in Hungary. According to data from the 2022 census, the population of ethnic Serbs in Hungary is 11,622, constituting 0.1% of the total population.

Small Serb communities are scattered mostly in the southern part of the country (near the border with Serbia) where they usually make up from 2 to 5% of the population (up to around 240 ethnic Serbs at most): Battonya (241 ethnic Serbs or 4.8% of total population), Deszk (115 or 2.9%), Hercegszántó (61 or 3.7%). There are couple of settlements with Serb communities in wider Budapest region (Pest County), on the Csepel Island: Lórév (Serbian: Ловра / Lovra) - the only settlement with an ethnic Serb majority in Hungary (154 or 51%), and Szigetcsép (67 or 2.4%). Most ethnic Serbs nowadays are to be found in cities and towns. In Budapest, ethnic Serbs form 7th largest ethnic group with 2,818 people or 0.1% of city's population. In Szeged, third-largest city in Hungary, Serbs form 4th largest ethnic group with 758 people or 0.4% of city's population. There are also small Serb communities in towns of Baja (131 or 0.4%) and Szentendre (114 or 0.4%).

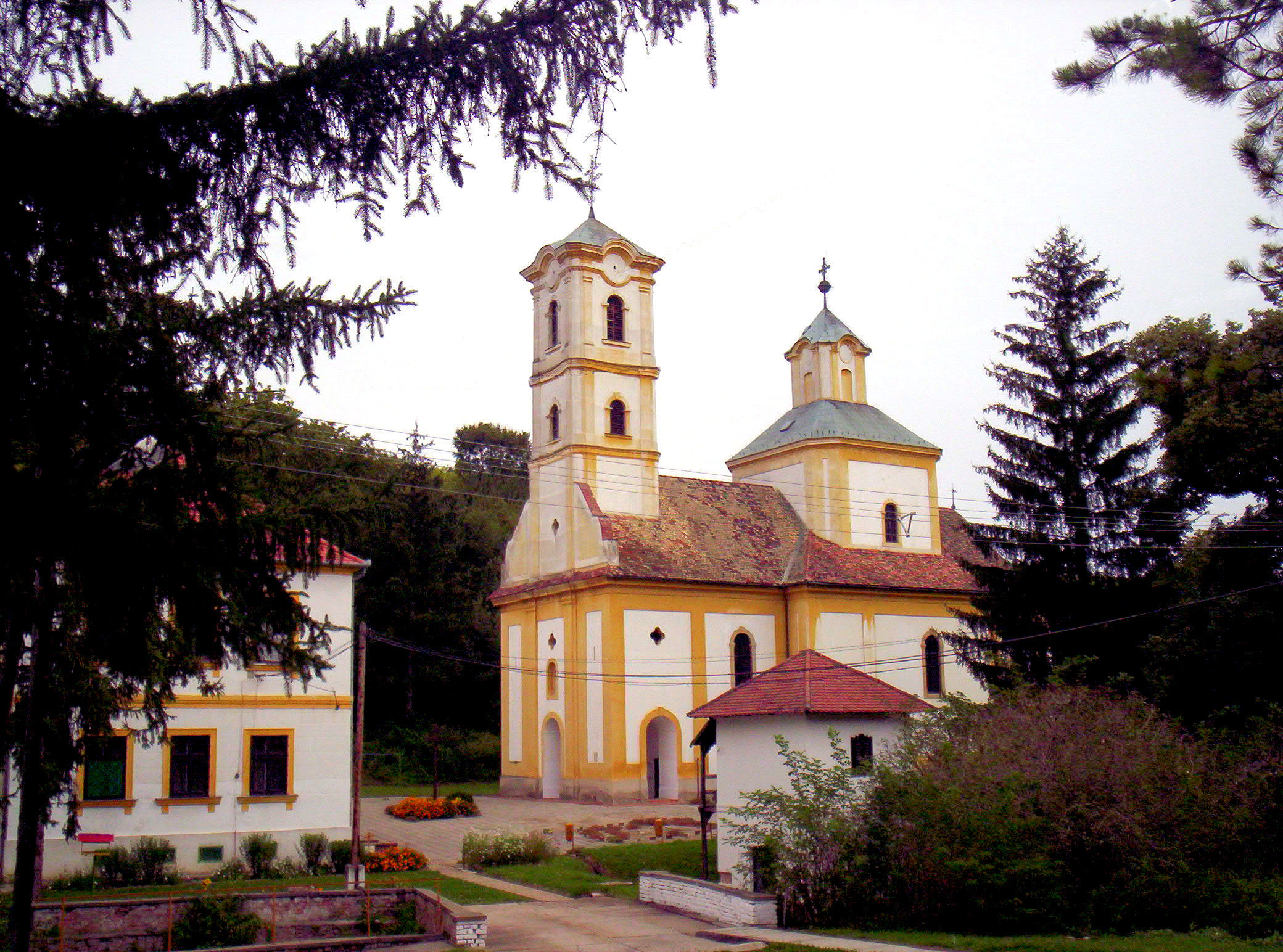
Grabovac Monastery

The presence of Serbs in the territory of present-day Hungary dates from the Middle Ages. Since the 15th century, and particularly during the late 17th-early 18th century, escaping from the Ottoman threat, a large number of Serbs migrated to the Kingdom of Hungary. The South Slavic peoples (Serbs, Bosnian Muslims) expanded northward in the wake of the Ottoman conquest, while the Hungarian population that had survived it fled the area over the course of the 17th century. Throughout the 17th century, the newly settled Orthodox South Slavic population provided the Ottoman army in this region with military garrisons, logistical support, and food supplies. Consequently, the Hungarians derisively referred to the region of Ottoman conquest as "Rascia" (Serbia) thereafter. The most prominent example of Serb architectural heritage in Hungary is the old town of Szentendre (Serbian: Sentandreja), with seven Serbian Orthodox churches, brightly coloured merchant houses and the Museum of Serbian Orthodox Heritage. In Budapest, there is an old Serbian Orthodox church in Serb Street, Pest, and the famous Serbian college, Thökölyanum (Serbian: Tekelijanum). The number of Serbian Orthodox churches is far higher than would be expected by the small size of contemporary Serb population in Hungary. These baroque churches were mostly built in the 18 and 19th centuries when Serb merchants formed rich and influential communities in Hungarian towns. Village churches show the historical presence of Serbs even in many places from where they absolutely disappeared by now.

== Resident diplomatic missions ==
- Hungary has an embassy in Belgrade and a consulate general in Subotica.
- Serbia has an embassy in Budapest and an honorary consulate in Szeged.
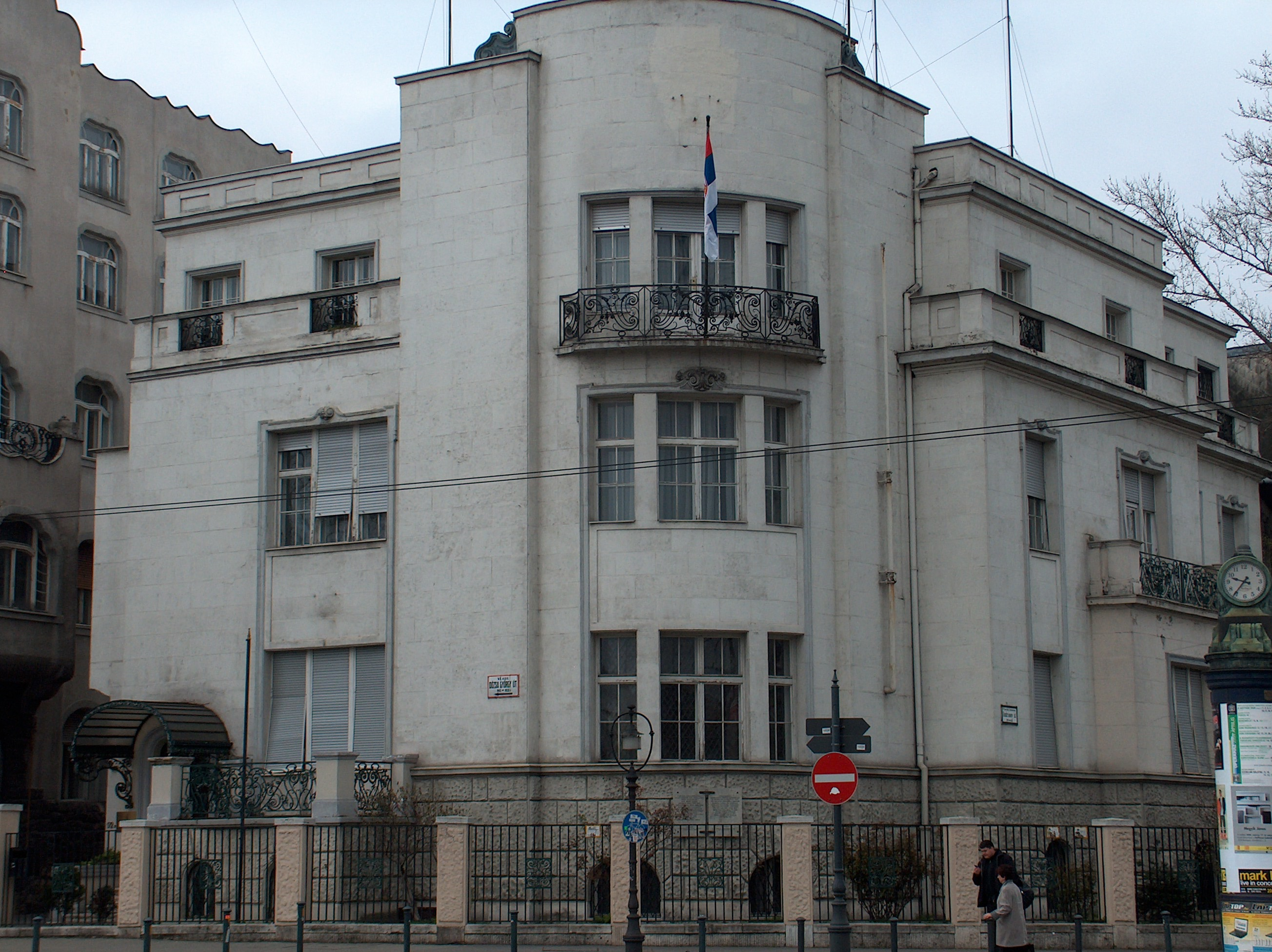
Embassy of Serbia in Budapest

== See also ==
- Foreign relations of Hungary
- Foreign relations of Serbia
- Serbia–NATO relations
- Accession of Serbia to the EU
- Hungary–Yugoslavia relations

== Sources ==
- Krestić, Vasilije (2015). "The Serbs in Hungary during the First World War". The Serbs and the First World War 1914-1918. Belgrade: Serbian Academy of Sciences and Arts. pp. 43–56. ISBN 9788670256590.
- McDaniel, Gordon L. (1984). "On Hungarian-Serbian Relations in the Thirteenth Century: John Angelos and Queen Jelena" (PDF). Ungarn-Jahrbuch. 12 (1982-1983): München, 1984: 43–50.
- Margalits, Ede (1918). Szerb történelmi repertorium. Budapest: Magyar Tudományos Akadémia.
- Пот, Иштван (1993). Српско-мађарски културни односи у XIX веку. Нови Сад: Матица српска.
- Thallóczy, Lajos; Áldásy, Antal, eds. (1907). Magyarország és Szerbia közti összeköttetések oklevéltára 1198-1526. Budapest: Magyar Tudományos Akadémia.
