= Petr Maslov (economist) =

Russian economist and agriculturist (1867–1949)

- Пётр Маслов
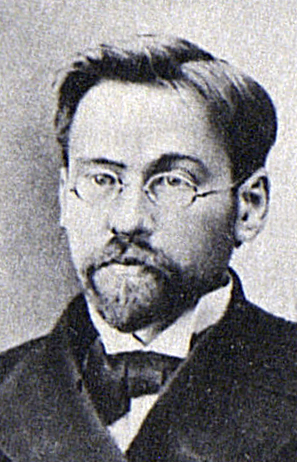
- Born: Pyotr Pavlovich Maslov; 15 July 1867; Maslovka, Kursk Governorate, Russian Empire
- Died: 4 June 1946 (aged 78); Moscow, Russian SFSR, Soviet Union
- Resting place: Novodevichy Cemetery
- Education: University of Vienna
- Political party: RSDLP
- Other political affiliations: Mensheviks
- Partner: Alexandra Kollontai
- Relatives: Victor Maslov (grandson)

Pyotr Pavlovich Maslov (Russian: Пётр Павлович Маслов; 15 (27) July 1867 – 4 June 1946) was a Russian and Soviet economist and agriculturist.

== Biography ==
Born in Maslovka, Maslov attended at the Kharkov Veterinary Institute. He was in contact with the Marxist study circle of Nikolai Fedoseev, a contact which led to his arrest in 1889. He joined the Menshevik faction of the Russian Social Democratic Labour Party, and became a spokesperson on agrarian reform. He advocated the municipalisation of the land, in order to appeal to the peasantry by expropriating the land without compensation, and making it available to them cheaply, without giving them ownership. This was similar to a proposal by Lenin, except the latter wanted the land owned by central government.

After the defeat of the 1905 Russian Revolution he became a liquidationist and collaborated with Alexander Potresov. During the First World War he became a defencist. After the February Revolution, as a member of the Central Land Committee, he took part in the preparation of the land law. He was a member of the administrative committee of the League of Agrarian Reforms. Maslov was a member of the Provisional Council of the Republic. After the October Revolution he held anti-Bolshevik views and was a commissar in the Provisional Siberian Government and participated in the State Meeting in Ufa.

Subsequently, Maslov came to terms with the new Soviet government and became involved in scientific activity.

In November 1918 he was appointed professor at the Omsk Agricultural Institute in the Department of Political Economy and Statistics. From 1923 to 1926 he was a professor at the Moscow State University and the Plekhanov Institute of National Economy. From 1924 to 1929 he worked at the Institute of Economics at the Russian Association of Social Science Research Institutes (RANION). In 1929 he was elected a full member of the Academy of Sciences of the Soviet Union.

He was involved in the case of the Union Bureau of the Mensheviks. On 25 April 1931 he was released from custody and exiled outside Moscow for three years. When the case was reviewed on 30 April 1931 Maslov was relieved from all charges.

Maslov died on 4 June 1946 in Moscow. He was buried at the Novodevichy Cemetery.

== Family ==
Maslov's grandson is Victor Maslov, mathematician and physicist, academician of the Russian Academy of Sciences.
