= Maslovka, Prokhorovsky District, Belgorod Oblast =

Maslovka Масловка
- Selo
- Location within Belgorod Oblast Location within Russia
- Coordinates: 51°04′N 37°07′E
- Country: Russia
- Region: Belgorod Oblast
- District: Prokhorovsky District
- Time zone: UTC+3:00

Maslovka (Russian: Масловка) is a rural locality (a selo) in Prokhorovsky District, Belgorod Oblast, Russia. The population was 371 as of 2010. There are 5 streets.

== Geography ==
Maslovka is located 30 km east of Prokhorovka (the district's administrative centre) by road. Raisovka is the nearest rural locality.
