= Viktor Maslov =

Viktor Maslov may refer to:

- Viktor Maslov (footballer, born 1910) (1910–1977), Soviet footballer and coach
- Viktor Maslov (footballer, born 1949), Ukrainian footballer and football referee
- Viktor Maslov (mathematician) (1930–2023), Russian mathematician
- Viktor Maslov (racing driver) (born 1976), Russian race car driver
- Viktor Maslov (politician) (born 1950), Governor of Smolensk Oblast, Russia
