= Embassy of Serbia, Budapest =

Serbian diplomatic mission to Hungary

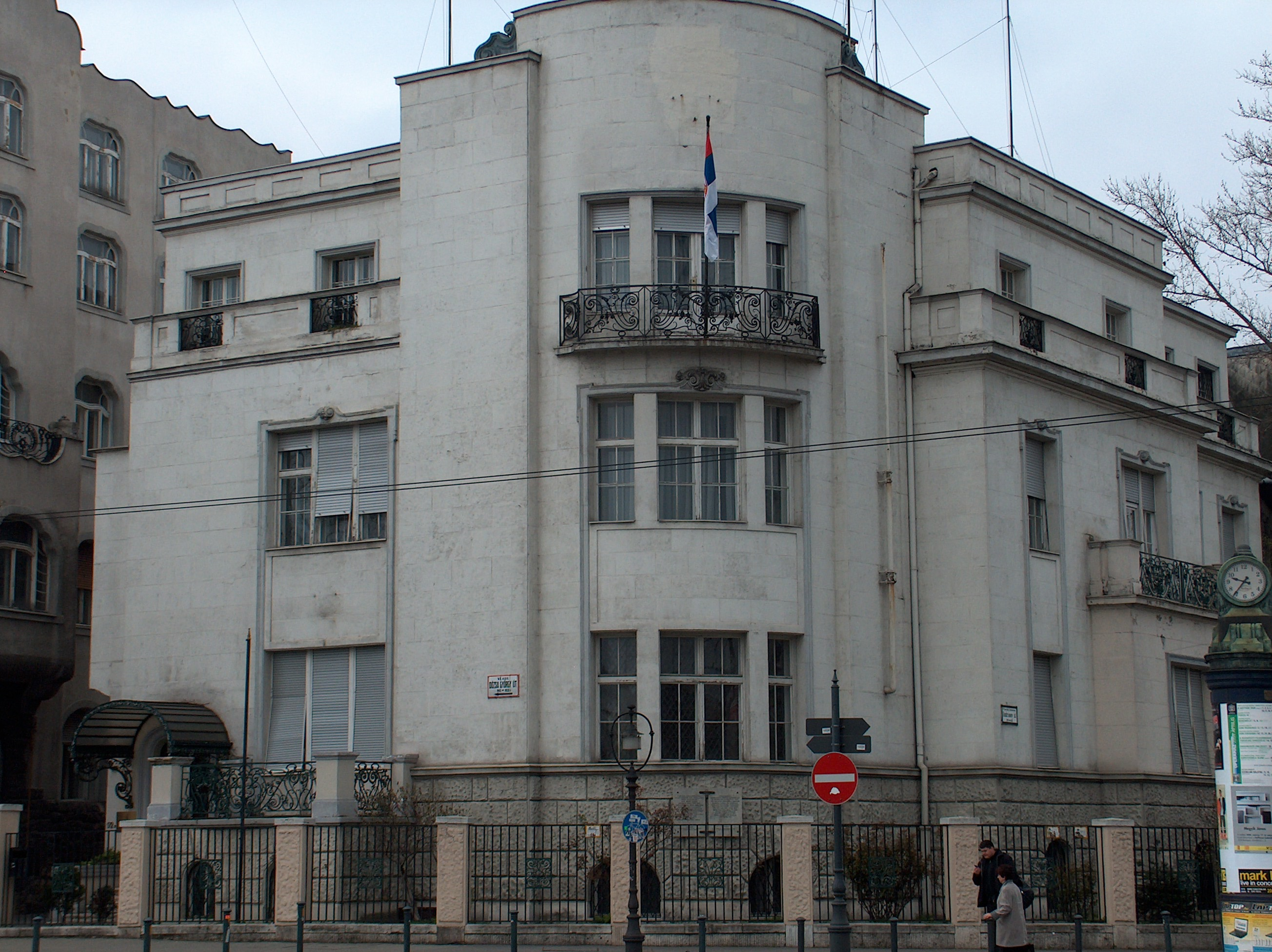
- Location: Budapest, Hungary
- Address: Dózsa György út 92/b
- Coordinates: 47.51392°N 19.07706°E
- Ambassador: Aleksandra Đurović

The Embassy of Serbia in Budapest (Hungarian: Szerbia budapesti nagykövetsége, Serbian: Амбасада Србије у Будимпешти, romanized: Ambasada Srbije u Budimpešti) is diplomatic mission of Serbia to Hungary. It is located at 1068, Dózsa György út 92/b.

The current Serbian ambassador to Hungary is Aleksandra Đurović.

== History ==
The building used to be a seat of Yugoslavian Embassy and later Embassy of Serbia and Montenegro.

In 1956, Prime Minister Imre Nagy asked for asylum and secured sanctuary in the embassy after the anti-Soviet revolution was crushed. However, he was later arrested, deported to Romania and executed in 1958. The embassy overlooks Andrássy Avenue and Heroes' Square, where the 1989 memorial service for the reburial of Nagy and others took place in front of a crowd of 250,000 people.

During the ceremony marking the 50th anniversary of the Hungarian Revolution of 1956 in 2006, the President of Serbia, Boris Tadić, and the Prime Minister of Hungary Ferenc Gyurcsány, revealed a commemorative plaque placed at the entrance, dedicated to Imre Nagy.

On 2 February 2025, a group of people gathered in front of the embassy building to protest in solidarity with the 2024–2025 Serbian anti-corruption protests. An unknown man inside the embassy gave middle finger to the protesters from the open window. Ambassador Aleksandra Đurović declined to either apologize or reveal the identity of the man.

== Gallery ==
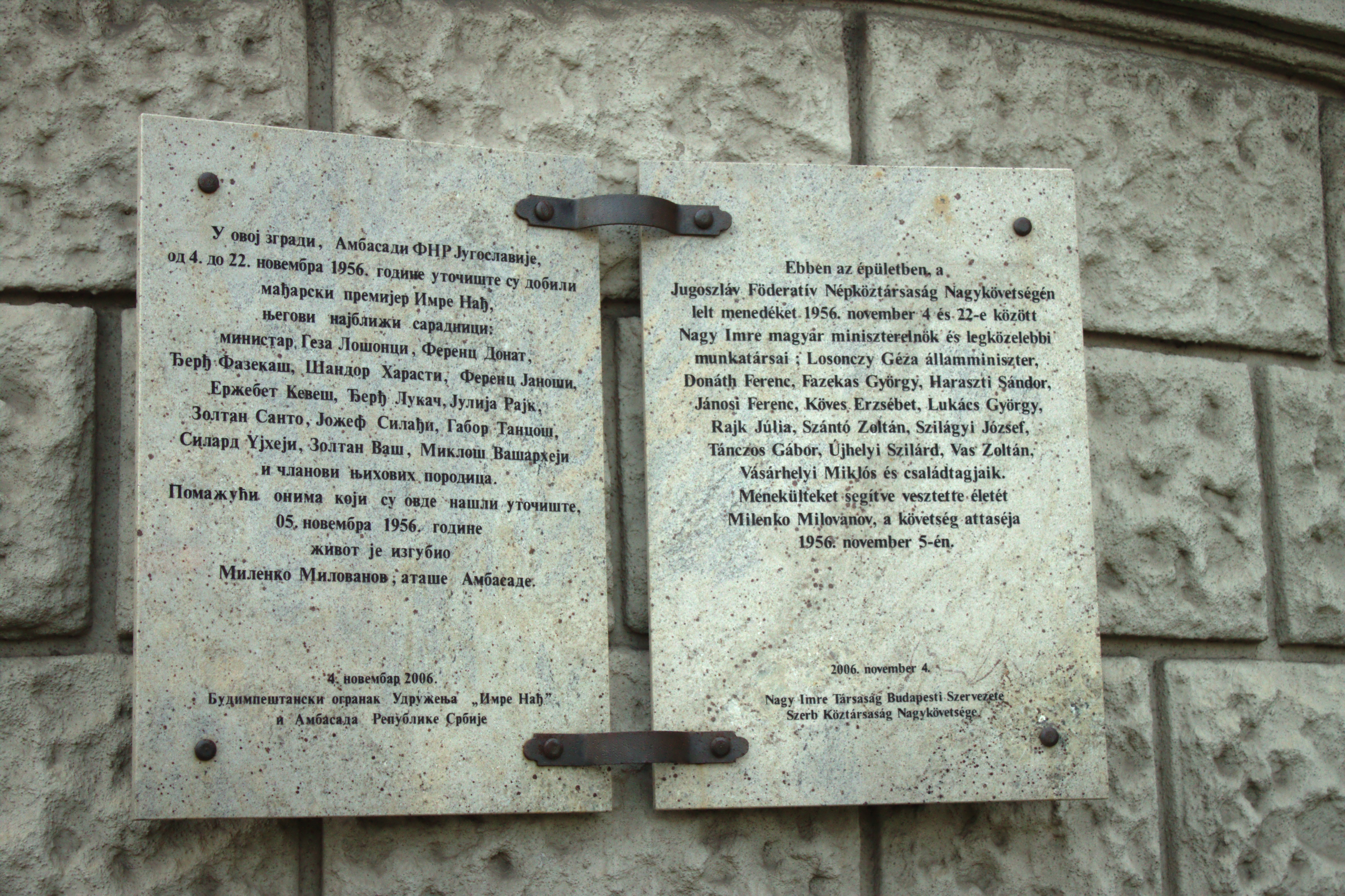
Memorial plaque in memory of Imre Nagy, who found sanctuary there during the Hungarian Revolution of 1956

== See also ==
- Hungary–Serbia relations
- Foreign relations of Serbia
