= Sergey Maslov =

Sergey Maslov may refer to:

- Sergey Nikolaevich Maslov (1867 - 1927) statesman
- Sergei Maslov (MAG), COO and Field Commander of Seryi Volk Executive Response (SVER) in a PlayStation 3 game MAG
- Sergey Maslov (footballer, born 1975), Russian footballer with FC Dynamo Stavropol and FC Rostselmash Rostov-on-Don
- Sergey Maslov (footballer, born 1990), Russian footballer with FC Khimki
