= Yuriy Maslov =

Ukrainian economist and educator

- Юрій Костянтинович Маслов
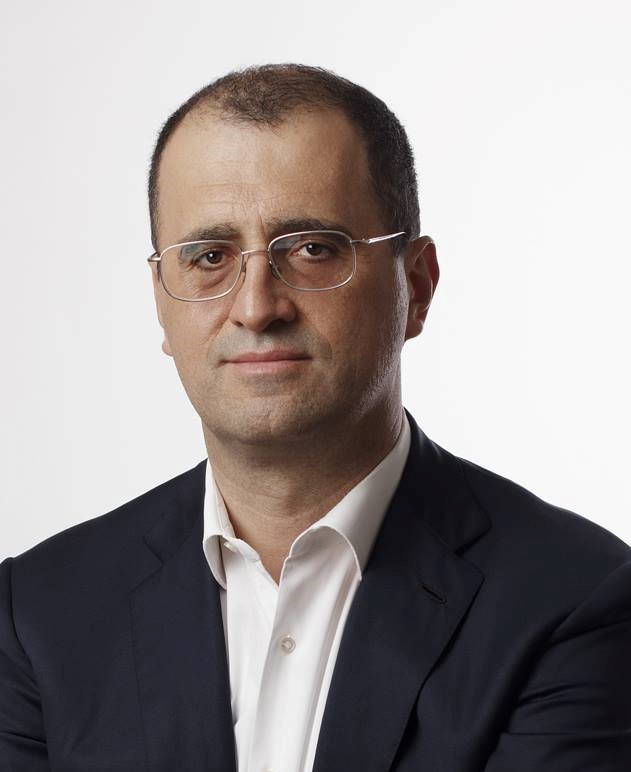

Personal details
- Born: 7 June 1968 (age 58) Odesa, Ukraine
- Awards: Order of Merit (Ukraine) Honored Economist of Ukraine

Yuriy Maslov (Ukrainian: Юрій Костянтинович Маслов; born June 7, 1968, Odesa) is a Ukrainian economist, educator, public and state figure, one of the founders of the implementation of the European Union Strategy for the Danube Region in Ukraine.

== Biography ==
In 1989, he graduated from the Odesa National Economics University with a degree in Accounting and Analysis of Economic Activity, obtaining the qualification of economist.

From 1993 to 2003, he headed the Odesa branch of First Ukrainian International Bank (PUMB) and was a member of the bank's Management Board.

From May 2003 to April 2009, he was the head of the Odesa Regional Branch of UkrSocBank and a member of the bank's management board.

In 2008, he defended his dissertation and earned the academic degree of Candidate of Economic Sciences in specialty 08.04.01 – Finance, Money Circulation, and Credit.

In 2006, he was awarded the honorary title Honored Economist of Ukraine.

From August 2009 to March 2010, he served as chairman of the management board of Kyiv Bank.

In 2010, he worked as an Advisor to the Minister of Economy of Ukraine.

From 2012 to 2016, he lectured at the K. D. Ushinsky South Ukrainian National Pedagogical University.

In 2015, he defended his doctoral dissertation “Formation of the Modern System of Power in the Countries of Central and Eastern Europe: Principles, Mechanisms, and Prospects for Development” and obtained the academic degree of Doctor of Political Sciences (specialty 23.00.02 – Political Institutions and Processes).

In 2016, he was elected by competition as a professor at the Odesa National Economic University.

Since 2017, he has been a member of the Specialized Academic Council D 41.053.06 at the South Ukrainian National Pedagogical University named after K. D. Ushynsky, for defending doctoral (PhD) dissertations in specialty 23.00.02 – Political Systems and Processes.

Since 2020, he has been an Academician of the Academy of Political Sciences of Ukraine.

He is the author of more than 70 scientific works published in Ukrainian and international journals.

Since December 2024, he has served as Advisor to the Head of the State Agency on Energy Efficiency and Energy Saving of Ukraine.

Since March 2025, he has been a Member of the supervisory board of the Joint-Stock Company “Decarbonization Fund of Ukraine”, and Chairman of the Audit Committee of the Supervisory Board.

== Public activity ==
Maslov has been an active supporter of European integration processes in Ukraine, as well as of cross-border and interregional cooperation. Since the adoption of the EU Strategy for the Danube Region, he initiated the signing of a Memorandum of Cooperation between the Odesa, Ivano-Frankivsk, Zakarpattia, and Chernivtsi regions — a strategic document on regional cooperation within the framework of the EU Strategy for the Danube Region.

He is a member of the Coordination Center for Activities Related to Ukraine's Participation in the Implementation of the EU Strategy for the Danube Region.

Since 2015, he has served as President of the Association of Ukrainian Regions «EU Strategy for the Danube Region»

Since 2016 — Head of the Deputies’ Group of the Odesa Oblast Council “EU Strategy for the Danube Region.”

He is the author of the “Perspective Plan of Measures for the Implementation of the EU Strategy for the Danube Region in the Territory of Odesa Region.”

Since 2018, he has headed the Basin Council of the Lower Danube under the State Agency for Water Resources of Ukraine. Maslov is an expert on environmental protection, water resource management, and the creation and expansion of nature reserves in the Ukrainian part of the Danube Region.

Since 2007, he has chaired the Board of Trustees of the Odesa Museum of Western and Eastern Art. Thanks to successful fundraising campaigns led by the Board of Trustees, the museum's Antique and Oriental hallswere restored, its exhibition collections were replenished, and cooperation was established with museum institutions in Ukraine and abroad.

Since 2017, he has served as chairman of the Board of Trustees of the Odesa Regional Philharmonic. He contributed to the publication of the unique album “Music and Word” marking the 85th anniversary of the Odesa Regional Philharmonic.

Since 2023, he has been the Head of the NGO “Ukraine Rebuilding Alliance”.

Maslov is also a collector and expert on rare old printed books and unique manuscripts from the 16th to 19th centuries. With his assistance, rare publications have been added to the collections of the Odesa National Scientific Library named after M. Gorky and the Odesa Regional Universal Scientific Library named after Mykhailo Hrushevsky.

He also acquired the photographic archive of Vikentii Kugel and initiated the publication of the book “Vikentii Kugel. A Photographer’s View.”

== Awards ==
- Honorary Diploma of the State Department of Maritime and River Transport (Order No. 121-k of December 25, 2000).
- Honorary Worker of Maritime and River Transport (Order of the State Department of Maritime and River Transport No. 212-k of October 10, 2006).
- Honorary Distinction of the Odesa Regional Council (Order of the Head of the Odesa Regional Council of June 6, 2003).
- Honorary Diploma of the Verkhovna Rada of Ukraine (Order of the Speaker of the Verkhovna Rada No. 1586 of November 30, 2005).
- Honorary Distinction of the Head of the Odesa Regional State Administration (Order of the Head of the Odesa RSA of December 31, 2005).
- Honorary Title “Honored Economist of Ukraine” (Decree of the President of Ukraine No. 1004/2006 of November 28, 2006).
- Honorary Diploma of the National Bank of Ukraine (Resolution of the NBU Board No. 64 of February 10, 2009).
- Order of Merit (3rd Class) (Decree of the President of Ukraine No. 475/2009 of June 23, 2009).
- Letter of Appreciation from the Prime Minister of Ukraine (No. 15013 of August 22, 2012).
- Honorary Diploma of the Cabinet of Ministers of Ukraine (No. 24431 of August 1, 2013).
- Distinction of the Head of the Odesa Regional State Administration (August 27, 2014).
- Order of Merit (2nd Class) (Decree of the President of Ukraine No. 14 of January 22, 2019).
- Honorary Citizen of Baltimore (Maryland, USA), Vylkove (Ukraine), and Kiliia (Ukraine).
