= Hungary and NATO =

Hungary's involvement in NATO

Hungary – NATO relations
- NATO: Hungary

Hungary joined North Atlantic Treaty Organization (NATO) on 12 March 1999, following the decision taken at the Madrid Summit, in July 1997.

== History ==
Hungary joined the Partnership for Peace in 1994. Hungary, along with the Czech Republic and Poland, received an invitation to participate in the 1997 Madrid Summit and became a full member on 12 March 1999.

=== Finnish and Swedish accession bids ===
In May 2022, Hungary announced that it would support Finland and Sweden's NATO membership process.

In November 2022, Hungarian Prime Minister Viktor Orbán announced that the parliament on the issue of Finland and Sweden's membership in NATO will be held in its first session in 2023. In March 2023, Hungarian Prime Minister Orbán's party, Fidesz, announced that they support Finland and Sweden's applications for NATO membership.

In March 2023, Hungary approved Finland's membership process but did not approve Sweden's membership process. In June 2023, Hungary announced that it was postponing Sweden's membership process.

On 4 July 2023, Hungary announced that they would act together with Turkey on Sweden's NATO membership.

In July 2023, Hungary announced that it would fully support Sweden's membership process after Turkey's objections were removed. In July 2023, Hungary announced that its vote on Sweden's membership application was postponed until the autumn.

On 23 January 2024, Hungarian Prime Minister Viktor Orbán sent a letter to Swedish Prime Minister Ulf Kristersson, inviting him to Budapest to negotiate Sweden's accession into NATO. However, Swedish Foreign Minister Tobias Billström rejected Hungary's call to negotiate, stating that, although he was open to a constructive conversation, there was no reason to do so.

On 24 January 2024, Viktor Orbán posted on X that, following a phone call with NATO Secretary General Jens Stoltenberg, he reaffirms the Hungarian government's support for Sweden's NATO membership and will urge the Hungarian National Assembly to approve it at the earliest opportunity. Ágnes Vadai, of Hungarian opposition Democratic Coalition expressed a desire to force a vote in the parliament prior to the body's scheduled reconvening in late February, in spite of opposition from majority party Fidesz.

On 25 January 2024, Swedish Prime Minister Kristersson invited Hungarian Prime Minister Orbán to discuss Sweden's membership application in Brussels.

On 26 February 2024, the Hungarian Parliament approved Sweden's application for accession 188 to 6. Only the Mi Hazánk (Our Homeland) party voted against it.

== Hungary's foreign relations with NATO member states ==
- Albania
- Belgium
- Bulgaria
- Canada
- Croatia
- Czech Republic
- Denmark
- Estonia
- Finland
- France
- Germany
- Greece
- Iceland
- Italy
- Latvia
- Lithuania
- Luxembourg
- Montenegro
- Netherlands
- North Macedonia
- Norway
- Poland
- Portugal
- Romania
- Slovakia
- Slovenia
- Spain
- Sweden
- Turkey
- United Kingdom
- United States

== See also ==
- Foreign relations of Hungary
- Foreign relations of NATO
- Hungary in the European Union
