= Hungary–Palestine relations =

- Hungary: Palestine

Hungary–Palestine relations refer to the bilateral relations between Hungary and the State of Palestine. The Hungarian People's Republic extended recognition to the State of Palestine on 23 November 1988.

== History ==
In 1975, the PLO opened an office in Budapest and gained diplomatic status in 1982. In 1988, after the recognition of independence it was raised to a full-fledged embassy. In 2011, the Palestinian President visited Hungary at the invitation of President Pál Schmitt. That same year, Hungarian foreign minister János Martonyi reaffirmed Hungarian support for Palestinian statehood. Many Palestinian students study in Hungarian universities via scholarships (Stipendium hungaricum).

In May 2024, under leadership of prime minister Viktor Orbán, Hungary was one of the nine countries which voted against Palestine's UN membership. Hungary is considered to be one of Israel's closest allies in Europe. During that time, the government stated that it was "opposed" to what it called "one-sided recognition of a Palestinian state". In June 2026, following the formation of a new Hungarian government, the State Secretary for Bilateral Relations at the Ministry of Foreign Affairs (Hungary) once more stated that Hungary aspired to "balanced relations with all parties" and referred to Palestine as a country.

== See also ==
- Foreign relations of Hungary
- Foreign relations of Palestine
- Hungary–Israel relations
