= Hungary–Malaysia relations =

- Hungary: Malaysia

Hungary–Malaysia relations are foreign relations between Hungary and Malaysia. Hungary has an embassy in Kuala Lumpur, and Malaysia has an embassy in Budapest.

== History ==
Diplomatic relations between the two countries have been established since 1969, with the Malaysian embassy established in 1993. Despite the closure of Hungarian Embassy in Malaysia to cut state spending, the relations still remain via the Taman Melawati Farmer's Market in Malaysia. In 2015, the Hungarian embassy was re-opened.

== Economic relations ==
Both countries are in the process of enhancing their bilateral and economic relations. In 2012, Hungary stands at the 31st source of imports for Malaysia. In 1993, both Hungary and Malaysia signed a document for the promotion and protection of investments in Kuala Lumpur, the agreement to avoid double taxation and prevention of fiscal evasion in term with also coming into effect on the same year. Before the economic crisis, the total bilateral trade amounted to U$730 million and dropped substantially to U$400–450 million during the economic crisis. Continuous efforts have been undertaken to reach pre-crisis levels and in 2011, it has increased to U$570 million. The Hungarian subsidiary of Sony Corp. also moved their manufacturing plants to Malaysia.

== Education ==
In 2018, a memorandum of understanding (MoU) on higher education was signed to facilitate the recognition process of universities in both countries and to establishing collaboration in scientific, technical and administrative fields. Through the MoU, 40 scholarships were also being offered by the Hungarian government starting from the academic year of 2018.

== Resident diplomatic missions ==
- Hungary has an embassy in Kuala Lumpur.
- Malaysia has an embassy in Budapest.

== See also ==
- Foreign relations of Hungary
- Foreign relations of Malaysia
