= Ghana–Hungary relations =

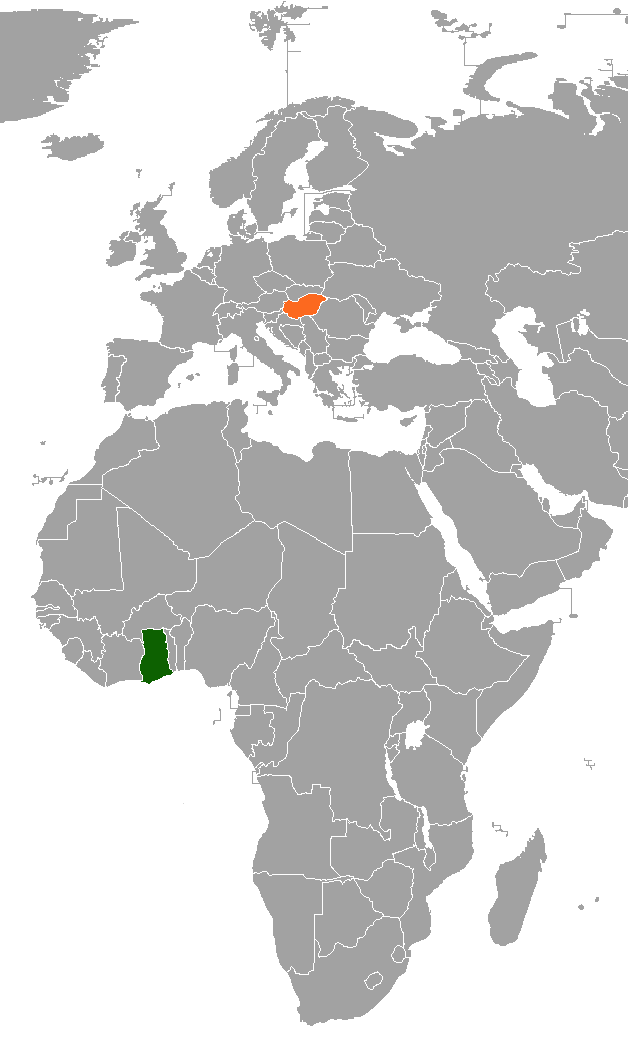

- Ghana: Hungary

Ghana–Hungary relations are the bilateral relations between Ghana and Hungary. Ghana has an embassy in Budapest. Hungary has an embassy in Accra.

== History ==
=== Socialist era ===
The Hungarian People's Republic was one of the first countries to acknowledge Ghana's independence, the first official Hungarian trade delegation visited the African country in August 1959. During the Cold War, Ghanaian President Kwame Nkrumah gradually became affiliated with the Soviet Union following hist ideological turn towards "African socialism" and his confrontation with the Western Bloc in the Congo Crisis. Nkrumah made a two-month round-trip in the Soviet Union and the Eastern Bloc (including Yugoslavia and China too) in the summer of 1961, during which he visited Hungary from 28 to 31 July. Nkrumah met Hungarian head of state István Dobi, then Secretary-General János Kádár. Nkrumah also visited the Beloiannisz Electric Equipment Factory (BHG). There, Hungarian politician Károly Kiss emphasized the similarity of the two countries' historical past and their fight against imperialist colonists.

Simultaneously with Nkrumah's visit, Hungary opened its embassy in Accra on 29 July 1961. The first ambassador, Péter Kós, presented his credentials to Nkrumah on 13 December 1961. Ghana also established its embassy in Budapest, chargé d'affaires R. N. N. Laryea arrived in Hungary in January 1962. The first ambassador J. G. Amamoo presented his credentials to István Dobi on 7 March. During his appointment, the 28-year-old diplomat was the youngest ambassador in the world. A Hungarian delegation of economic experts, led by József Bognár, a former Mayor of Budapest, was invited to Ghana to work on the First Seven-Year Plan. The team spent two months in Ghana in early 1962.

After the 1966 coup in Ghana, the relationship had gradually deteriorated between the two countries. Hungary closed its embassy on 15 December 1987.

=== 21st century ===
Hungary reopened its embassy in Accra on 1 April 2016 as part of the Orbán government's "Southern Opening" foreign policy program. The embassy also serves eight other West African countries namely Togo, Burkina Faso, Ivory Coast, Liberia, Guinea, Sierra Leone, Gambia, and Senegal. Following the revitalization of bilateral relations, Hungary has partnered with the Ghanaian government on several projects and invested tens of millions of euros in the country. Former Ambassador András Szabó announced a $70 million-worth of power generation investment as part of the 400+ megawatt Bridge Power Project. The funds were used to purchase three out of five GE aero-derivative gas turbines used during the first stage of the r plant.

In line with the new Hungarian foreign policy, the Hungarian Foreign Minister Péter Szijjártó visited Ghana in 2017 and announced several new projects and the establishment of the Ghanaian-Hungarian Business Council tasked with overseeing and managing the coordination of businesses operating in both countries. During his two-day visit, the Foreign Minister promoted projects such as the building of a wastewater treatment plant in Kumasi, the construction of food processing factories, the building of bridges, and the investment in the aforementioned power plant.

In January 2022, the Hungarian President, János Áder visited Ghana. He was the first Hungarian President to do so since 1989.

The embassy also holds the annual Hungarian Cultural Week in Accra to promote bilateral relations and educate Ghanaians about Hungary.

== See also ==
- Foreign relations of Ghana
- Foreign relations of Hungary

== Sources ==
- Baráth, Magdolna; Gecsényi, Lajos, eds. (2015). Főkonzulok, követek és nagykövetek 1945–1990 [Consuls General, Envoys, Ambassadors 1945–1990] (in Hungarian). MTA Bölcsészettudományi Kutatóközpont. ISBN 978-963-416-007-6.
- Francz, Norbert (2016). A független Ghána első évtizede [The First Decade of Independent Ghana] (in Hungarian). M.A. Thesis, Eötvös Loránd University.
