= Hungary–Iran relations =

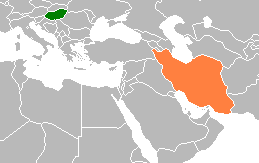

- Hungary: Iran

Diplomatic mission
- Hungarian embassy in Tehran: Iranian embassy in Budapest

Hungary–Iran relations are foreign relations between Hungary and Iran. Both countries established diplomatic relations in 1939. Since 1951, Hungary has had an embassy in Tehran. Iran has an embassy in Budapest. Iran and Hungary have generally good relations, with no issues on political or internal matters.

== Modern relations ==
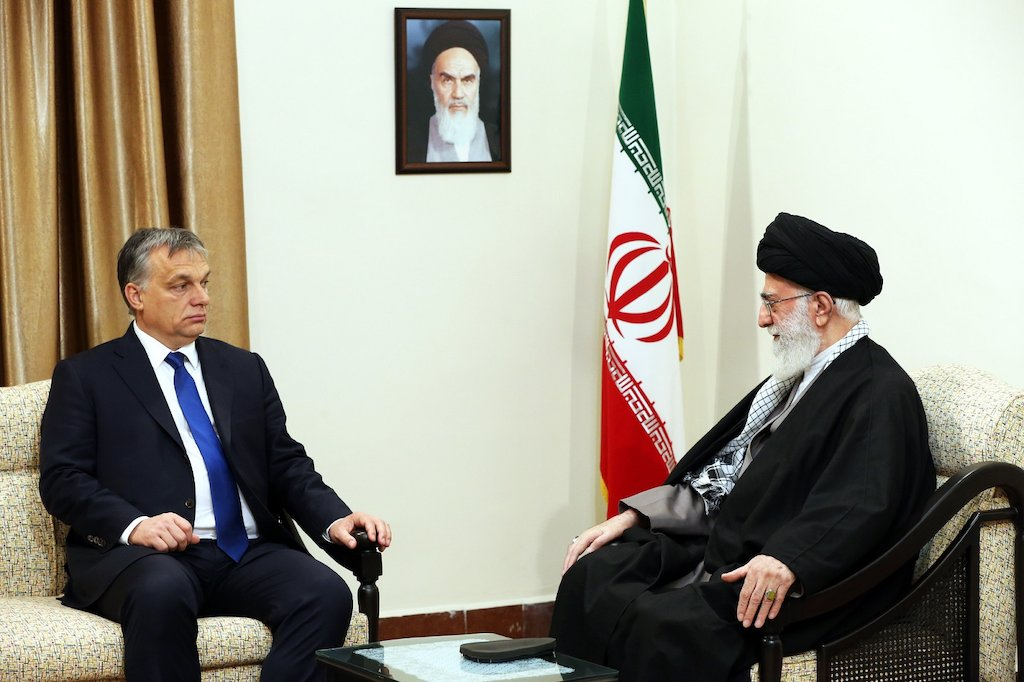
Viktor Orbán meeting Ali Khamenei in December 2015

During Viktor Orbán’s tenure as prime minister of Hungary, relations between Hungary and Iran have increased. Hungary has hosted forums for Iranian businesses in Budapest, and has offered academic scholarships to Iranian students, almost 2,000 of whom are currently studying in Hungary. Orbán visited Iran in 2015 and met Iran's leader, Ali Khamenei.

Péter Szijjártó, the Hungarian foreign minister, has described the Hungarian–Iranian relationship as "free of political disputes." He has travelled to Iran several times, and signed agreements on trade and agriculture.

== Resident diplomatic missions ==
- Hungary has an embassy in Tehran.
- Iran has an embassy in Budapest.
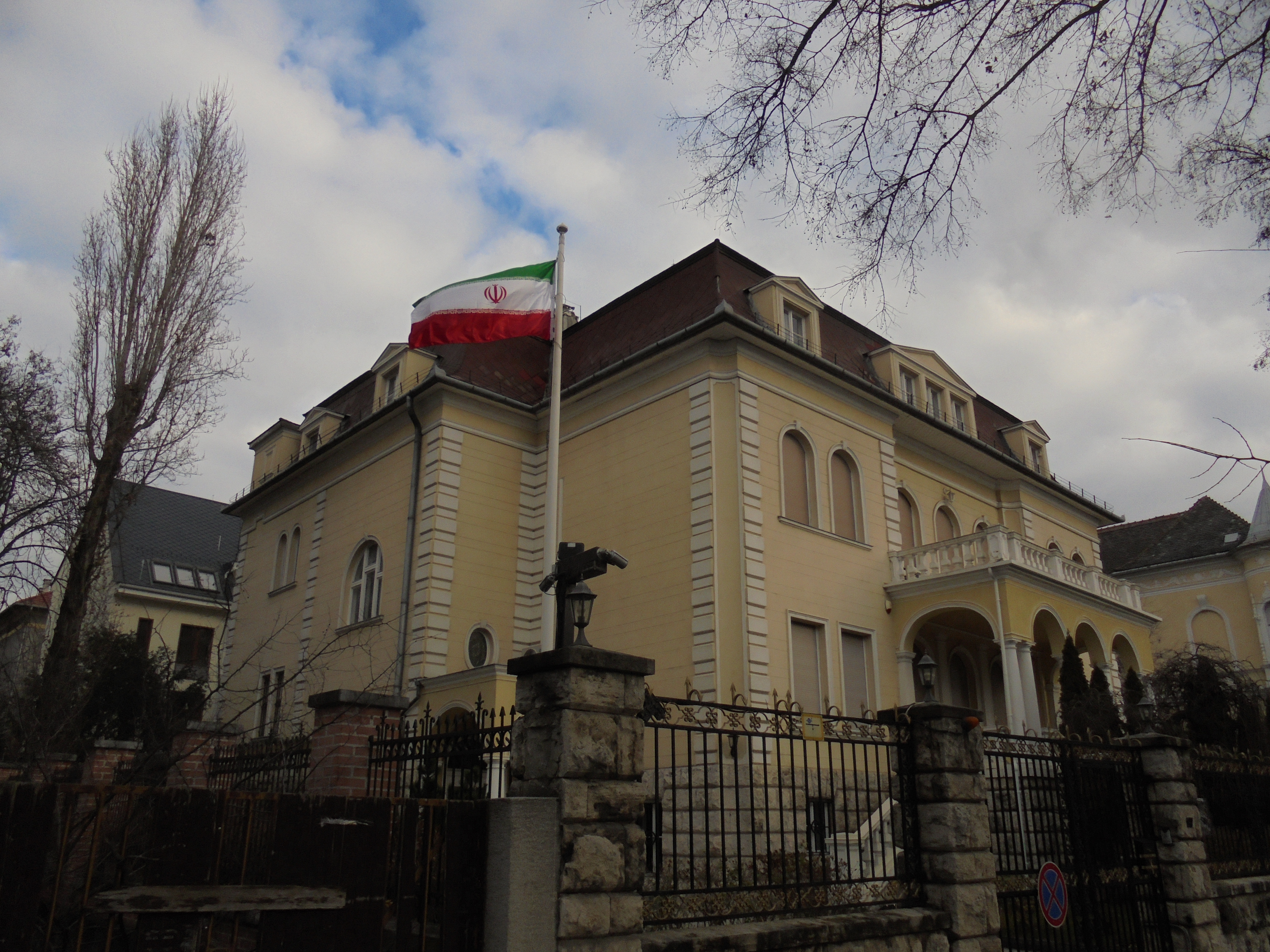
Embassy of Iran in Budapest

== See also ==
- Foreign relations of Hungary
- Foreign relations of Iran
