= Hungary–Japan relations =

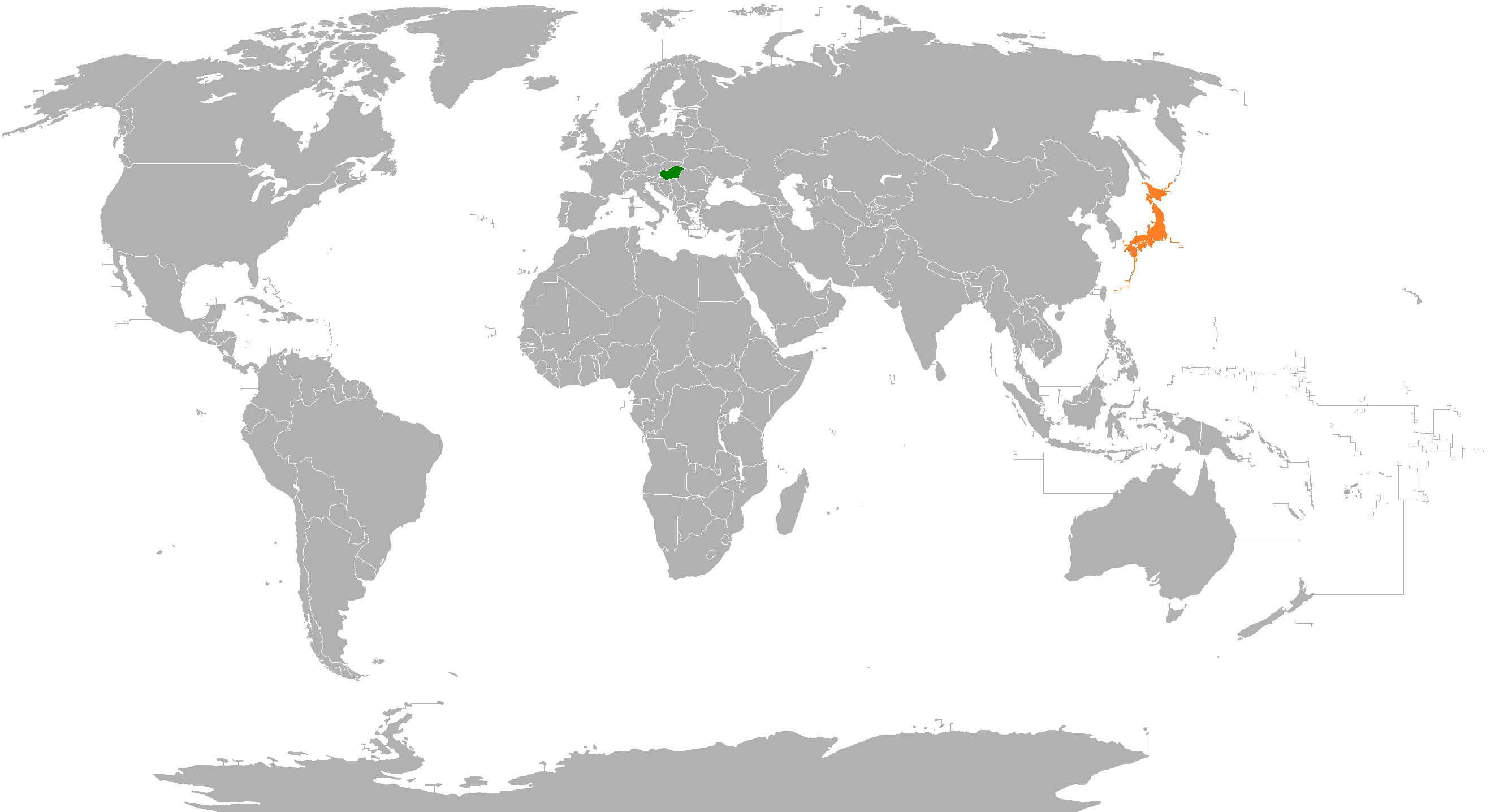

- Hungary: Japan

Hungary–Japan relations are the bilateral relations between Hungary and Japan. After World War II, both countries re-established diplomatic relations in August 1959. Hungary has an embassy in Tokyo and a consulate in Osaka. Japan has an embassy in Budapest.

Both countries are full members of the OECD, World Trade Organization and United Nations.

== High-level mutual visits ==
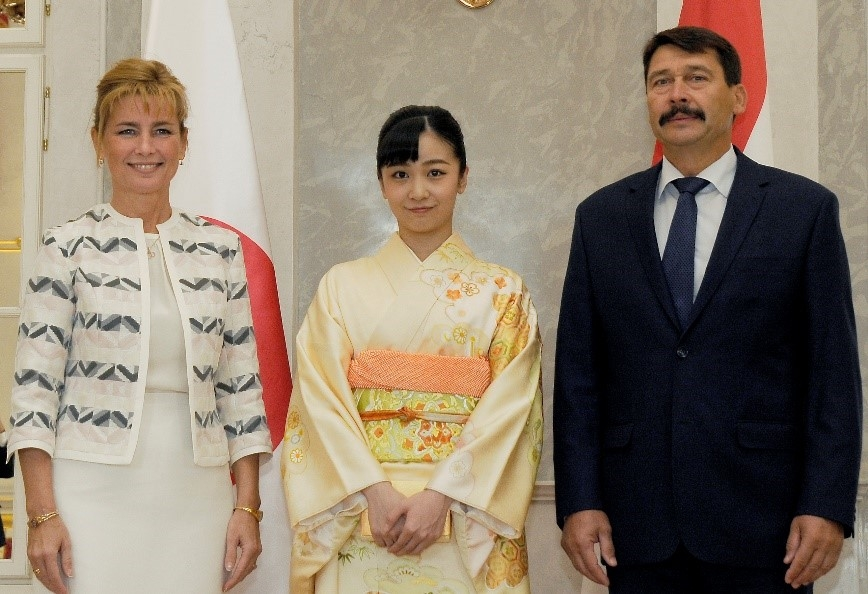
Meeting of Hungarian President János Áder and First Lady Anita Herczegh with Princess Kako of Akishino in Budapest in 2019

=== Head of States ===
- April 2000 - President of Hungary Árpád Göncz's official visit
- July 2002 - Emperor of Japan Akihito official visit
- December 2009 - President of Hungary László Sólyom's working visit.

== Resident diplomatic missions ==
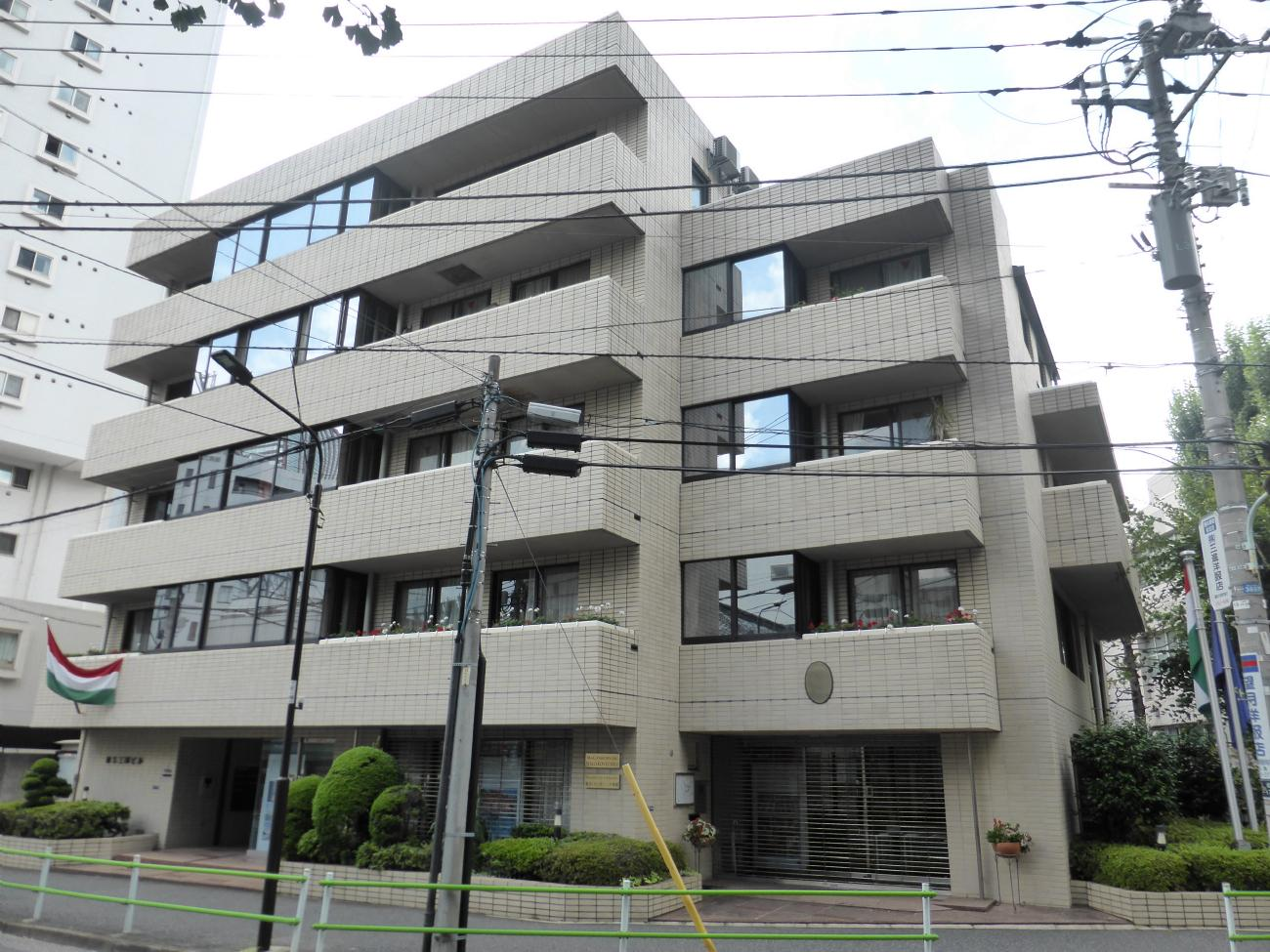
Embassy of Hungary in Tokyo

- Hungary has an embassy in Tokyo and a consulate in Osaka.
- Japan has an embassy in Budapest.

== See also ==
- Foreign relations of Hungary
- Foreign relations of Japan
