= Foreign relations of Hungary =

Hungary wields considerable influence in Central and Eastern Europe and is a middle power in international affairs. The foreign policy of Hungary includes commitments to international development, international law, European integration, Atlantic co-operation and increased co-operation within the Global East. The Hungarian economy is fairly open and relies strongly on international trade.

Hungary has been a member of the United Nations since December 1955 and holds current membership with the European Union, NATO, the OECD, the Visegrád Group, the WTO, the World Bank, the AIIB and the IMF. Hungary took on the presidency of the Council of the European Union for half a year in 2011 and the next will be in 2024. In 2015, Hungary was the fifth largest OECD Non-DAC donor of development aid in the world, which represents 0.13% of its Gross National Income. In this regard, Hungary stands before Spain, Israel or Russia.

Hungary's capital city, Budapest is home to more than 100 embassies and foreign representative bodies. Hungary hosts the main and regional headquarters of many international organizations as well, including European Institute of Innovation and Technology, European Police College, United Nations High Commissioner for Refugees, Food and Agriculture Organization of the United Nations, International Centre for Democratic Transition, Institute of International Education, International Labour Organization, International Organization for Migration, International Red Cross, Regional Environmental Center for Central and Eastern Europe, Danube Commission and even others.

From 1989, Hungary's top foreign policy goal was achieving integration into Western economic and security organizations. It joined the Partnership for Peace program in 1994 and has actively supported the IFOR and SFOR missions in Bosnia. It also improved its often frosty neighborly relations by signing basic treaties with Ukraine, Slovakia, and Romania. These renounce all outstanding territorial claims and lay the foundation for constructive relations. However, the issue of ethnic Hungarian minority rights in Romania, Slovakia and Ukraine periodically causes bilateral tensions to flare up. Hungary since 1989 has signed all of the OSCE documents, and served as the OSCE's Chairman-in-Office in 1997. Hungary's record of implementing CSCE Helsinki Final Act provisions, including those on the reunification of divided families, remains among the best in Central and Eastern Europe.

Except for the short-lived neutrality declared by the anti-Soviet leader Imre Nagy in November 1956, Hungary's foreign policy generally followed the Soviet lead from 1947 to 1989. During the Communist period, Hungary maintained treaties of friendship, cooperation, and mutual assistance with the Soviet Union, Poland, Czechoslovakia, the German Democratic Republic, Romania, and Bulgaria. It was one of the founding members of the Soviet-led Warsaw Pact and Comecon, and it was the first country to withdraw from those organizations. After 1989, it began to orient more towards the West, joining NATO in 1999 and the European Union in 2004. In 2010, Hungary initiated its Eastern Opening Policy, marking a commitment to enhancing its relations with other nations within the Global East.

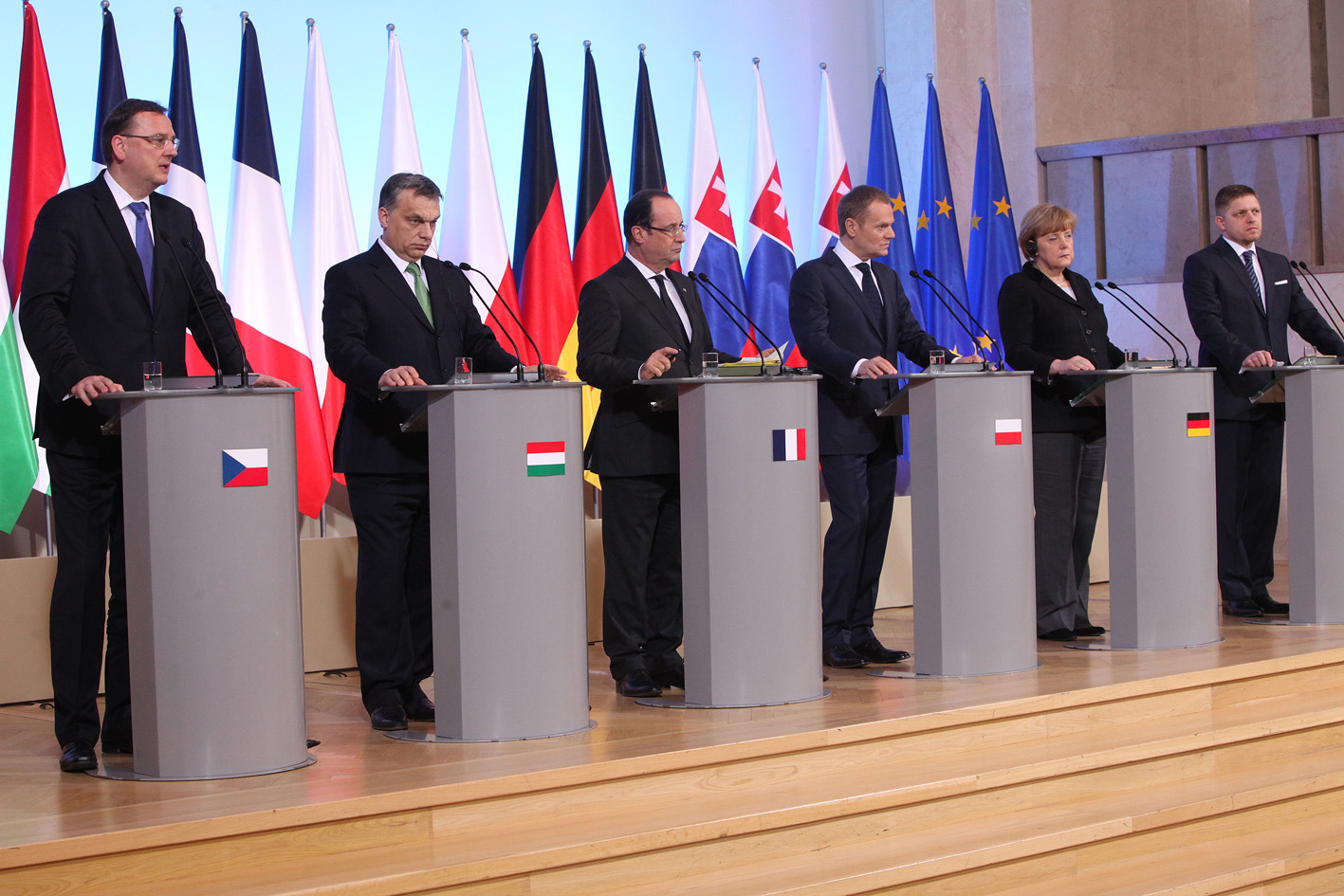
Meeting of Visegrád Group leaders, plus Germany and France in 2013

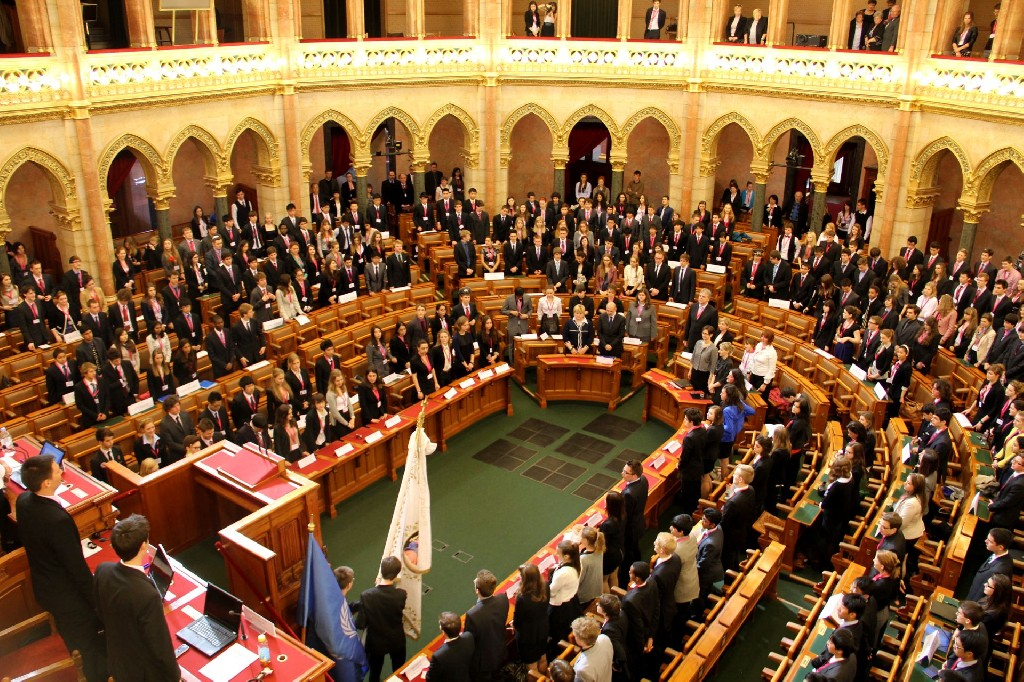
United Nations conference in the assembly hall of House of Magnates in the Hungarian Parliament

== Overview ==
As with any country, Hungarian security attitudes are shaped largely by history and geography. For Hungary, this is a history of more than 400 years of domination by great powers—the Ottomans, the Habsburg dynasty, the Germans during World War II, and the Soviets during the Cold War—and a geography of regional instability and separation from Hungarian minorities living in neighboring countries. Hungary's foreign policy priorities, largely consistent since 1990, represent a direct response to these factors. From 1990, Hungary's top foreign policy goal was achieving integration into Western economic and security organizations. Hungary joined the Partnership for Peace program in 1994 and has actively supported the IFOR and SFOR missions in Bosnia. The Horn government achieved Hungary's most important foreign policy successes of the post-communist era by securing invitations to join both NATO and the European Union in 1997. Hungary became a member of NATO in 1999, and a member of the EU in 2004.

Hungary also has improved its often frosty neighborly relations by signing basic treaties with Romania, Slovakia, and Ukraine. These renounce all outstanding territorial claims and lay the foundation for constructive relations. However, the issue of ethnic Hungarian minority rights in Slovakia and Romania periodically causes bilateral tensions to flare up. Hungary was a signatory to the Helsinki Final Act in 1975, has signed all of the CSCE/OSCE follow-on documents since 1989, and served as the OSCE's Chairman-in-Office in 1997. Hungary's record of implementing CSCE Helsinki Final Act provisions, including those on the reunification of divided families, remains among the best in eastern Europe. Hungary has been a member of the United Nations since December 1955.

The Gabčíkovo - Nagymaros Dams project

This involves Hungary and Czechoslovakia, and was agreed on September 16, 1977 ("Budapest Treaty"). The treaty envisioned a cross-border barrage system between the towns Gabčíkovo, Czechoslovakia and Nagymaros, Hungary. After an intensive campaign, the project became widely hated as a symbol of the old communist regime. In 1989 the Hungarian government decided to suspend it. In its sentence from September 1997, the International Court of Justice stated that both sides breached their obligation and that the 1977 Budapest Treaty is still valid. In 1998 the Slovak government turned to the International Court, demanding the Nagymaros part to be built. The international dispute was partially solved in 2017.

On March 19, 2008, Hungary recognized Kosovo as an independent country.

Relations between Hungary and its Western partners have strained, because Orban's government has maintained relations with Russia despite sanctions against Russia after the 2022 Russian invasion of Ukraine.

Illicit drugs: Major trans-shipment point for Southwest Asian heroin and cannabis and transit point for South American cocaine destined for Western Europe; limited producer of precursor chemicals, particularly for amphetamines and methamphetamines

Refugee protection: The Hungarian border barrier was built in 2015, and Hungary was criticized by other European countries for using tear gas and water cannons on refugees of the Syrian Civil War as they were trying to pass the country.

Since 2017, Hungary–Ukraine relations have rapidly deteriorated over the issue of the Hungarian minority in Ukraine.

The U.S. election on 5 November 2024 resulted in a landslide Republican victory. Hungarian Prime Minister Viktor Orbán loudly and consistently proclaimed that he not only expected Trump to take back the presidency but heartfully wished him to do so. Thanks to Orbán's unwavering support towards Trump, the personal relationship between the two statesmen has become impeccable, especially during the Biden administration when U.S.-Hungarian relations hit rock bottom.

== Hungary and Turkic States ==
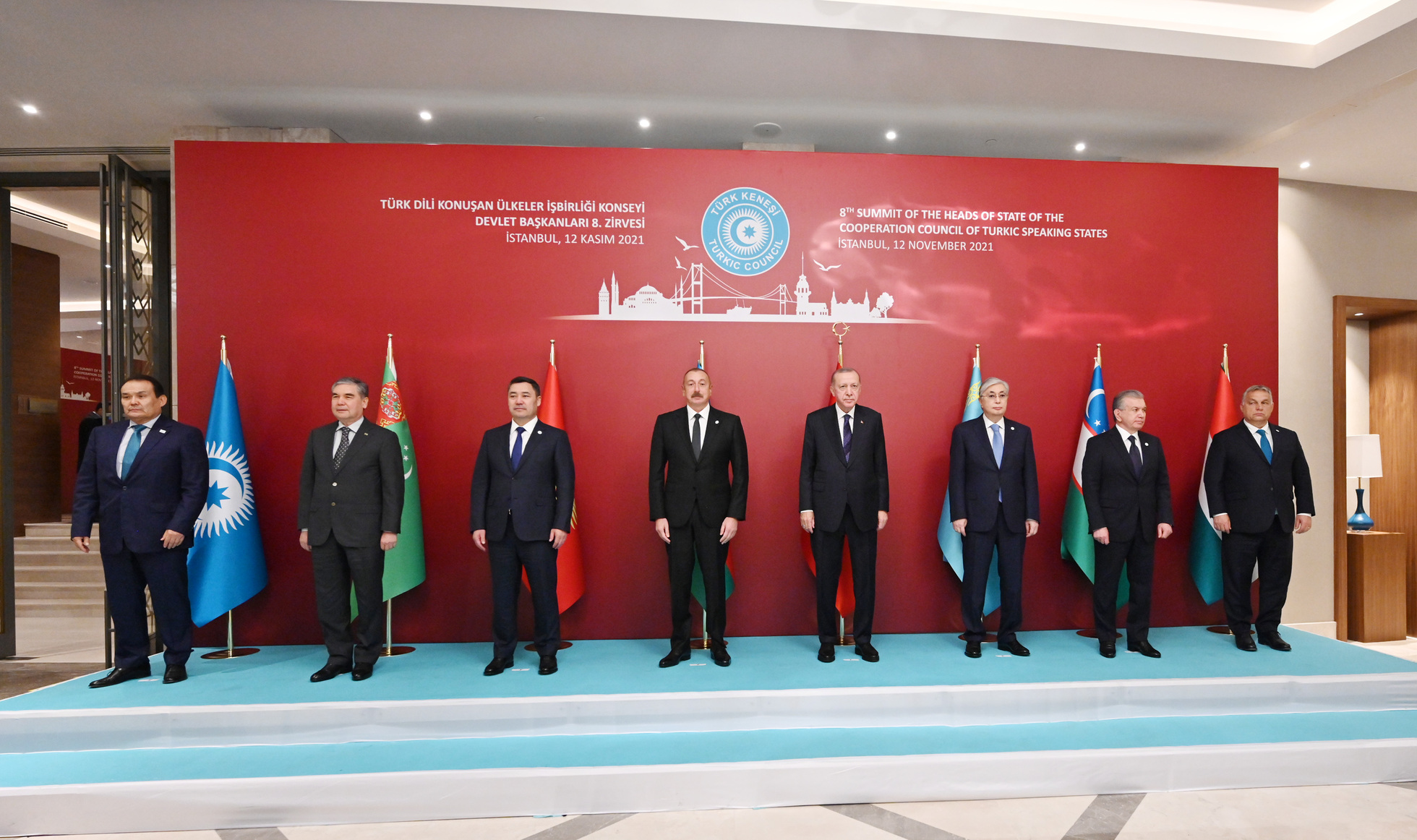
Viktor Orbán at the 8th Summit of the Organization of Turkic States

A number of Hungarian anthropologists and linguists have long had an interest in the Turkic peoples, fueled by the eastern origin of the Hungarians' ancestors. The Hungarian ethnomusicologist Bence Szabolcsi explained this motivation as follows: "Hungarians are the outermost branch leaning this way from age-old tree of the great Asian musical culture rooted in the souls of a variety of peoples living from China through Central Asia to the Black Sea".

Since the political transformation in 1990, Hungary has prioritized its diplomatic engagements with the Turkic world. In 2018, Hungary became an observer within the Organisation of Turkic States, underscoring a deepened engagement in regional cooperation. Today, Türkiye and Azerbaijan constitute two of Hungary’s key strategic partners.

== Diplomatic relations ==
List of countries which Hungary maintains diplomatic relations with:

| # | Country | Date |
|---|---|---|
| 1 | Austria | 20 November 1918 |
| 2 | Switzerland | February 1919 |
| 3 | France | 8 January 1920 |
| 4 | Norway | 12 February 1920 |
| 5 | Bulgaria | 9 August 1920 |
| — | Holy See | 10 August 1920 |
| 6 | Romania | 21 August 1920 |
| 7 | Denmark | 12 November 1920 |
| 8 | Sweden | 12 November 1920 |
| 9 | Japan | 9 February 1921 |
| 10 | Netherlands | 14 January 1921 |
| 11 | United Kingdom | 22 May 1921 |
| 12 | Serbia | June 1921 |
| 13 | Poland | 17 November 1921 |
| 14 | Greece | 2 December 1921 |
| 15 | United States | 17 December 1921 |
| 16 | Czech Republic | 6 February 1922 |
| 17 | Belgium | 20 February 1922 |
| 18 | Finland | 12 April 1922 |
| 19 | Albania | 23 May 1922 |
| 20 | Luxembourg | 17 July 1923 |
| 21 | Turkey | 7 May 1924 |
| 22 | Argentina | 25 June 1924 |
| 23 | Spain | 12 July 1924 |
| 24 | Chile | 7 August 1925 |
| 25 | Iran | 1925 |
| 26 | Mexico | 13 January 1926 |
| 27 | Portugal | 2 August 1926 |
| 28 | Italy | 15 April 1927 |
| 29 | Brazil | 1927 |
| 30 | Russia | 6 February 1934 |
| 31 | Ecuador | 3 January 1946 |
| 32 | North Korea | 11 November 1948 |
| 33 | India | 18 November 1948 |
| 34 | Israel | 6 February 1949 |
| 35 | China | 6 October 1949 |
| 36 | Vietnam | 3 February 1950 |
| 37 | Mongolia | 28 April 1950 |
| 38 | Bolivia | 17 October 1952 |
| 39 | Syria | 13 May 1954 |
| 40 | Egypt | 13 October 1954 |
| 41 | Indonesia | 26 June 1955 |
| 42 | Iceland | 17 July 1955 |
| 43 | Myanmar | 5 March 1956 |
| 44 | Sudan | 7 March 1956 |
| 45 | Afghanistan | 18 May 1956 |
| 46 | Uruguay | 14 June 1956 |
| 47 | Tunisia | 31 August 1956 |
| 48 | Iraq | 30 August 1958 |
| 49 | Sri Lanka | 15 February 1959 |
| 50 | Guinea | 26 February 1959 |
| 51 | Yemen | 21 March 1959 |
| 52 | Morocco | 23 October 1959 |
| 53 | Ethiopia | 17 November 1959 |
| 54 | Cuba | 15 September 1960 |
| 55 | Somalia | 14 October 1960 |
| 56 | Cyprus | 18 October 1960 |
| 57 | Nepal | 15 January 1961 |
| 58 | Mali | 12 March 1961 |
| 59 | Ghana | 29 July 1961 |
| 60 | Algeria | 7 April 1962 |
| 61 | Benin | 18 June 1962 |
| 62 | Laos | 12 September 1962 |
| 63 | Tanzania | 23 November 1962 |
| 64 | Cambodia | 22 July 1963 |
| 65 | Kenya | 21 March 1964 |
| 66 | Nigeria | 4 April 1964 |
| 67 | Kuwait | 7 May 1964 |
| 68 | Jordan | 16 May 1964 |
| 69 | Canada | 11 June 1964 |
| 70 | Pakistan | 26 February 1965 |
| 71 | Uganda | 23 August 1965 |
| 72 | Lebanon | 1 December 1965 |
| 73 | Mauritania | 1 December 1965 |
| 74 | Zambia | 13 August 1966 |
| 75 | Libya | 2 July 1967 |
| 76 | Senegal | 24 January 1968 |
| 77 | Ivory Coast | 22 February 1968 |
| 78 | Burundi | 29 May 1968 |
| 79 | Burkina Faso | 8 June 1968 |
| 80 | New Zealand | 30 March 1969 |
| 81 | Peru | 16 April 1969 |
| 82 | Venezuela | 30 April 1969 |
| 83 | Sierra Leone | 10 November 1969 |
| 84 | Malaysia | 29 December 1969 |
| 85 | Central African Republic | 10 February 1970 |
| 86 | Republic of the Congo | 14 February 1970 |
| 87 | Equatorial Guinea | 18 February 1970 |
| 88 | Costa Rica | 14 May 1970 |
| 89 | Togo | 20 June 1970 |
| 90 | Singapore | 24 August 1970 |
| 91 | Malta | 12 December 1970 |
| 92 | Bangladesh | 29 February 1972 |
| 93 | Australia | 6 April 1972 |
| 94 | Gambia | 14 June 1972 |
| 95 | Rwanda | 31 July 1972 |
| 96 | Chad | 1 November 1972 |
| 97 | Niger | 3 February 1973 |
| 98 | Colombia | 28 March 1973 |
| 99 | Guinea-Bissau | 15 June 1973 |
| 100 | Democratic Republic of the Congo | 16 June 1973 |
| 101 | Honduras | 2 July 1973 |
| 102 | Philippines | 28 September 1973 |
| 103 | Thailand | 24 October 1973 |
| 104 | Germany | 21 December 1973 |
| 105 | Jamaica | 8 February 1975 |
| 106 | Maldives | 25 May 1975 |
| 107 | Trinidad and Tobago | 7 June 1975 |
| 108 | Mozambique | 25 June 1975 |
| 109 | Guyana | 9 July 1975 |
| 110 | Cape Verde | 16 July 1975 |
| 111 | Panama | 4 September 1975 |
| 112 | Madagascar | 1 December 1975 |
| 113 | Angola | 23 December 1975 |
| 114 | Liberia | 15 July 1976 |
| 115 | Fiji | 12 August 1976 |
| 116 | Ireland | 1 October 1976 |
| 117 | São Tomé and Príncipe | 2 November 1976 |
| 118 | Papua New Guinea | 15 January 1977 |
| 119 | Djibouti | 28 June 1977 |
| 120 | Suriname | 14 July 1977 |
| 121 | Grenada | 30 July 1977 |
| 122 | Seychelles | 30 November 1977 |
| 123 | Comoros | 30 November 1977 |
| 124 | Barbados | 8 March 1978 |
| 125 | Nicaragua | 1 October 1979 |
| 126 | Botswana | 30 April 1980 |
| 127 | Zimbabwe | 22 December 1980 |
| 128 | Lesotho | 29 March 1983 |
| 129 | Cameroon | 21 January 1987 |
| 130 | Gabon | 24 October 1988 |
| — | State of Palestine | 23 November 1988 |
| 131 | South Korea | 1 February 1989 |
| 132 | United Arab Emirates | 2 August 1989 |
| 133 | Bahrain | 3 March 1990 |
| 134 | Namibia | 23 March 1990 |
| 135 | Mauritius | 24 April 1990 |
| 136 | Eswatini | 9 May 1990 |
| — | Sovereign Military Order of Malta | 15 June 1990 |
| 137 | Oman | 20 June 1990 |
| 138 | Guatemala | 11 October 1990 |
| 139 | Qatar | 18 October 1990 |
| 140 | Malawi | 26 December 1990 |
| 141 | Paraguay | 2 May 1991 |
| 142 | San Marino | 24 May 1991 |
| 143 | South Africa | 24 July 1991 |
| 144 | Estonia | 2 September 1991 |
| 145 | Latvia | 2 September 1991 |
| 146 | Lithuania | 2 September 1991 |
| 147 | El Salvador | 26 September 1991 |
| 148 | Ukraine | 3 December 1991 |
| 149 | Moldova | 16 January 1992 |
| 150 | Slovenia | 16 January 1992 |
| 151 | Croatia | 18 January 1992 |
| 152 | Brunei | 21 January 1992 |
| 153 | Belarus | 12 February 1992 |
| 154 | Armenia | 26 February 1992 |
| 155 | Uzbekistan | 3 March 1992 |
| 156 | Kazakhstan | 23 March 1992 |
| 157 | Bosnia and Herzegovina | 10 April 1992 |
| 158 | Kyrgyzstan | 16 April 1992 |
| 159 | Azerbaijan | 27 April 1992 |
| 160 | Turkmenistan | 11 May 1992 |
| 161 | Georgia | 14 May 1992 |
| 162 | Tajikistan | 2 July 1992 |
| 163 | Slovakia | 1 January 1993 |
| 164 | Liechtenstein | 14 June 1993 |
| 165 | Eritrea | 24 August 1993 |
| 166 | North Macedonia | 29 August 1994 |
| 167 | Andorra | 1 March 1995 |
| 168 | Saudi Arabia | 4 April 1995 |
| 169 | Dominican Republic | 7 March 2003 |
| 170 | Timor-Leste | 24 January 2003 |
| 171 | Bahamas | 29 April 2005 |
| 172 | Antigua and Barbuda | 16 May 2005 |
| 173 | Saint Vincent and the Grenadines | 23 May 2005 |
| 174 | Belize | 10 June 2005 |
| 175 | Haiti | 11 July 2005 |
| 176 | Saint Lucia | 7 October 2005 |
| 177 | Montenegro | 14 June 2006 |
| 178 | Dominica | 2 June 2008 |
| — | Kosovo | 27 June 2008 |
| 179 | Saint Kitts and Nevis | 11 May 2011 |
| 180 | Vanuatu | 6 June 2011 |
| 181 | Solomon Islands | 21 June 2011 |
| 182 | Tuvalu | 11 July 2011 |
| 183 | Nauru | 12 July 2011 |
| 184 | Samoa | 7 September 2011 |
| 185 | South Sudan | 23 September 2011 |
| 186 | Tonga | 23 September 2011 |
| 187 | Federated States of Micronesia | 7 September 2012 |
| 188 | Monaco | 2 May 2016 |
| 189 | Kiribati | 17 June 2016 |
| 190 | Palau | 18 September 2017 |
| — | Cook Islands | 20 September 2018 |
| 191 | Marshall Islands | 27 September 2019 |

== Relations by region and country ==
=== Multilateral ===
| Organization | Formal Relations Began | Notes |
|---|---|---|
| European Union | | (See Hungary in the European Union): Hungary joined the European Union as a full member on 1 May 2004. |
| NATO | | (See Hungary in NATO): Hungary joined NATO as a full member on 12 March 1999. |

=== Africa ===
| Country | Formal Relations Began | Notes |
|---|---|---|
| Cape Verde | | Cape Verde is accredited to Hungary from its embassy in Brussels, Belgium.; Hungary is accredited to Cape Verde from its embassy in Lisbon, Portugal and maintains an honorary consulate in Praia. |
| Ethiopia | | Ethiopia is accredited to Hungary from its Permanent Mission to the United Nations in Geneva, Switzerland.; Hungary has an embassy in Addis Ababa. |
| Ghana | | (See Ghana–Hungary relations): Ghana is accredited to Hungary from its embassy in Prague, Czech Republic.; Hungary has an embassy in Accra. |
| Guinea-Bissau | | Guinea-Bissau is accredited to Hungary from its embassy in Moscow, Russia.; Hungary is accredited to Guinea-Bissau from its embassy in Lisbon, Portugal. |
| Mauritania | | Hungary is accredited to Mauritania from its embassy in Rabat, Morocco. |
| Morocco | | Hungary has an embassy in Rabat.; Morocco has an embassy in Budapest.; Latifa Akharbach, Morocco's under-secretary of Minister of Foreign Affairs visited Hungary in 2007. |
| Uganda | | Hungary is represented in Uganda by its embassy in Nairobi, Kenya and an honorary consulate in Kampala.; Hungary is realizing the largest foreign development program in its history in Uganda. |

=== Americas ===
| Country | Formal Relations Began | Notes |
|---|---|---|
| Argentina | | (See Argentina–Hungary relations): Argentina has an embassy in Budapest.; Hungary has an embassy in Buenos Aires. |
| Belize | | Belize does not have an accreditation to Hungary.; Hungary does not have an accreditation to Belize. |
| Brazil | 1927 | (See Brazil–Hungary relations): Brazil has an embassy in Budapest.; Hungary has an embassy in Brasília and a consulate-general in São Paulo. |
| Canada | 1964 | (See Canada–Hungary relations): Canada has an embassy in Budapest.; Hungary has an embassy in Ottawa and a consulate-general in Toronto. |
| Colombia | 28 March 1973 | (See Colombia–Hungary relations): Colombia has an embassy in Budapest.; Hungary has an embassy in Bogotá. |
| Dominica | | Hungary is accredited to Dominica from its embassy in Havana, Cuba. |
| Mexico | 1925 | (See Hungary–Mexico relations) Both countries established diplomatic relations in 1864, during the time of the Austro-Hungarian Empire. Diplomatic relations were established between Hungary and Mexico in 1925 and were suspended in 1941. They were re-established on 14 May 1974.: Hungary has an embassy in Mexico City.; Mexico has an embassy in Budapest. |
| United States | 1922 | (See Hungary–United States relations) Hungarian Prime Minister Viktor Orbán with U.S. President Donald Trump in the Oval Office of the White House on 7 November 2025 Normal bilateral relations between Hungary and the U.S. were resumed in December 1945 when a U.S. ambassador was appointed and the embassy was re-opened.: Hungary has an embassy in Washington, D.C., and consulates-general in Los Angeles, Chicago and New York.; United States has an embassy in Budapest. |
| Uruguay | | (See Hungary–Uruguay relations): Hungary is accredited to Uruguay from its embassy in Buenos Aires, Argentina and has an embassy office in Montevideo.; Uruguay is accredited to Hungary from its embassy in Vienna, Austria. |

=== Asia ===
| Country | Formal Relations Began | Notes |
|---|---|---|
| Armenia | 2022-12-02 | (See Armenia–Hungary relations) On 31 August 2012, Armenia severed relations with Hungary following the extradition of Ramil Safarov. On 2 December 2022, Armenia and Hungary restored diplomatic relations.: There are around 15,000 people of Armenian descent living in Hungary. |
| Azerbaijan | | (See Azerbaijan–Hungary relations): Azerbaijan has an embassy in Budapest.; Hungary has an embassy in Baku. |
| China | 1949-10-04 | (See Hungary-China relations): China has an embassy in Budapest.; Hungary has an embassy in Beijing and consulates-general in Hong Kong and Shanghai.; Officials from Hungary regularly visit China on trade missions, a factor that helped enable the buyout of distressed Hungarian chemical maker Borsodchem by the Chinese company Wanhua Industrial Group. |
| Georgia | | Georgia has an embassy in Budapest.; Hungary has an embassy in Tbilisi. |
| India | | (See Hungary–India relations): Hungary has an embassy in New Delhi.; India has an embassy in Budapest. |
| Indonesia | 1955 | (See Hungary–Indonesia relations): Hungary has an embassy in Jakarta. opened in Jakarta, the Indonesian capital, in 1957. Hungary has two honorary consuls in Indonesia, one in Bandung, West Java and another in Denpasar, Bali. A third consul will be opened in Surabaya, East Java.; Indonesian Ministry of Foreign Affairs about the relation with Hungary; Indonesia has an embassy in Budapest. and there is a commercial developmental center too. |
| Iran | 1939 | (See Hungary–Iran relations): Since 1951, Hungary has an embassy in Tehran.; Iran has an embassy in Budapest.; Hungary is committed to expand cooperation with the Islamic Republic of Iran. |
| Iraq | | (See Hungary–Kurdistan Region relations): Hungary has an embassy in Baghdad.; Iraq has an embassy in Budapest.; Between August 2003 and March 2005, Hungary had contributed to more than 300 soldiers to the Multinational force in Iraq. |
| Israel | | (See Hungary–Israel relations): Hungary has an embassy in Tel Aviv and 4 honorary consulates (in Eilat, Haifa, Jerusalem and Tel Aviv).; Israel has an embassy in Budapest and an honorary consulate in Szeged.; Both countries are full members of the Union for the Mediterranean. |
| Japan | | (See Hungary–Japan relations): After World War II, both countries re-established diplomatic relations in August 1959.; Hungary has an embassy in Tokyo and 2 honorary consulates (in Hamamatsu and Osaka).; Japan has an embassy in Budapest.; Japanese Ministry of Foreign Affairs about relations with Hungary |
| Kazakhstan | | (See Hungary–Kazakhstan relations): Hungary has an embassy in Astana and a consulate-general in Almaty.; Kazakhstan has an embassy in Budapest. |
| Malaysia | 1969 | (See Hungary–Malaysia relations): Hungary has an embassy in Kuala Lumpur.; Malaysia has an embassy in Budapest.; Malaysia Ministry of Foreign Affairs about the relation with Hungary; Hungary–Malaysia relations on www.kln.gov.my |
| Mongolia | 1959-05-29 | Hungary is accredited to Mongolia from its embassy in Beijing, China and though an honorary consulate in Ulaanbaatar.; Mongolia has an embassy in Budapest.; Mongolian Ministry of Foreign Affairs: list of bilateral treaties with Hungary (in Mongolian only) |
| North Korea | | (See Hungary–North Korea relations): Relations between the two countries existed since the Korean War, but however have evolved into conflicts. |
| Pakistan | 1965-11-26 | (See Hungary–Pakistan relations): Since 1970, Hungary has an embassy in Islamabad and an honorary consulate in Karachi.; Pakistan has an embassy in Budapest |
| Palestine | 1988-11-23 | (See Hungary–Palestine relations): Hungary has a representative office in Ramallah.; Palestine has an embassy in Budapest. |
| Qatar | 18 October 1990 | Hungary has an embassy in Doha; Qatar has an embassy in Budapest; On 20 August 2023, President Katalin Novák welcomed Sheikh Tamim bin Hamad Al Thani to an official visit in Hungary. During the visit, Qatar agreed to supply Hungary with LNG starting in 2027. |
| Saudi Arabia | | Hungary has an embassy in Riyadh.; Saudi Arabia has an embassy in Budapest. |
| South Korea | 1 February 1989 | (See Hungary–South Korea relations) The establishment of diplomatic relations between Hungary and the Republic of Korea began on 1 February 1989.: Hungary and South Korea have good relations.; Permanent missions between the two countries were announced during the 1988 Summer Olympics in Seoul. The announcement made Hungary the first Eastern Bloc country to exchange ambassadors with South Korea.; Hungary has a Working Holiday Program Agreement with South Korea.; Hungarian embassy in Seoul.; South Korean embassy in Budapest.; South Korean Ministry of Foreign Affairs about relations with Hungary |
| Sri Lanka | | (See Hungary–Sri Lanka relations) Sri Lanka has an embassy in Vienna, Austria that is accredited to Hungary and has an honorary consulate in Budapest Hungary maintains an honorary consulate in Colombo, Sri Lanka. Hungary contributed to relief after the 2004 Indian Ocean earthquake and tsunami, and has since stepped up aid to Sri Lanka. |
| Thailand | 1973-10-24 | Since 1978, Hungary has an embassy in Bangkok and an honorary consulate in Pattaya.; Since 1989, Thailand has an embassy in Budapest. Thailand has also a commercial office in Budapest. |
| Turkey | | (See Hungary–Turkey relations) Memorial to Hungarian freedom fighters of 1848–1849 at Protestant Cemetery in Şişli, Istanbul.: Hungary has an embassy in Ankara and a consulate–general in Istanbul.; Turkey has an embassy in Budapest and an honorary consulate in Keszthely.; Both countries are full members of the Council of Europe, the OECD, the NATO, the OSCE and the WTO. Also, Hungary is an EU member and Turkey is a candidate. Hungary supports Turkey's accession negotiations to the EU, although negotiations have now been suspended. Hungary is also an observer nation in the Turkic Council.; Both countries have historical ties dating back to the 16th century. Hungary hosts a number of Ottoman-era monuments in cities such as Budapest, Eger, and Pécs.; Turkish Ministry of Foreign Affairs about relations with Hungary |
| United Arab Emirates | | Hungary has an embassy in Abu Dhabi.; United Arab Emirates has an embassy in Budapest. |
| Vietnam | 1950-02-03 | (See Hungary–Vietnam relations): Hungary has an embassy in Hanoi and an honorary consulate in Ho Chi Minh City.; Vietnam has an embassy in Budapest.; Vietnamese Ministry of Foreign Affairs about relations with Hungary |

=== Europe ===
| Country | Formal Relations Began | Notes |
|---|---|---|
| Albania | | (See Albania–Hungary relations) Austria-Hungary supported Albanian Declaration of Independence in 1912.: Albania has an embassy in Budapest.; Hungary has an embassy in Tirana.; Both countries are full members of NATO.; Albania is an candidate and Hungary is an EU member. |
| Austria | | (See Austria–Hungary relations) Austrian-Hungarian relations are the neighborly relations between Austria and Hungary, two member states of the European Union. Both countries have a long common history since the ruling dynasty of Austria, the Habsburgs, inherited the Hungarian throne in the 16th century. Both have been part of the now-defunct Austro-Hungarian Monarchy from 1867 to 1918. The two countries established diplomatic relations in 1921, after their separation.: Austria has an embassy in Budapest.; Hungary has an embassy in Vienna and a consulate-general in Innsbruck.; Both countries are full members of the European Union. |
| Belgium | | Belgium has an embassy in Budapest.; Hungary has an embassy in Brussels and 2 honorary consulates (in Antwerp and Liège).; Both countries are full members of the European Union and NATO.; See also:Hungarians in Belgium and Belgians in Hungary |
| Bosnia and Herzegovina | 1992-04-10 | Hungary recognized Bosnia and Herzegovina's independence on April 9, 1992.; Bosnia and Herzegovina has an embassy in Budapest.; Hungary has an embassy in Sarajevo.; Bosnia and Herzegovina is an candidate and Hungary is an EU member. |
| Bulgaria | 1920 | (See Bulgaria–Hungary relations): Bulgaria has an embassy in Budapest.; Hungary has an embassy in Sofia and an honorary consulate in Varna.; Both countries are full members of the European Union and NATO. |
| Croatia | | (See Croatia–Hungary relations): Croatia has an embassy in Budapest.; Hungary has an embassy in Zagreb.; Both countries are full members of the European Union and NATO. |
| Cyprus | | Cyprus has an embassy in Budapest.; Hungary has an embassy in Nicosia.; Both countries are full members of the European Union. |
| Czech Republic | | (See Czech Republic–Hungary relations): Czech Republic has an embassy in Budapest.; Hungary has an embassy in Prague.; Both countries are full members of the European Union and NATO. |
| Denmark | | (See Denmark–Hungary relations): Denmark has an embassy in Budapest.; Hungary has an embassy in Copenhagen.; Both countries are full members of the European Union and NATO. |
| Estonia | 1924-02-24 | (See Estonia–Hungary relations): Estonia has an embassy in Budapest.; Hungary has an embassy in Tallinn and two honorary consulates (in Tallinn and Tartu).; Both countries are full members of the European Union and NATO. |
| Finland | 20 May 1947 | (See Finland–Hungary relations): Hungary recognised Finland on August 23, 1920. Finland recognised Hungary on September 10, 1920.; Finland broke off diplomatic relations on September 20, 1944.; Diplomatic relations were re-established on May 20, 1947.; Both national languages, Finnish and Hungarian, are Uralic languages, which has led to cultural exchange albeit at a much smaller scale compared to the third major Uralic-speaking country, Estonia.; Finland has an embassy in Budapest and an honorary consulate in Pécs.; Hungary has an embassy in Helsinki and four honorary consulates (in Turku, Mariehamn, Tampere and Joensuu).; Both countries are full members of the European Union and NATO. |
| France | | (See France–Hungary relations): France has an embassy in Budapest.; Hungary has an embassy in Paris.; Both countries are full members of the European Union and NATO. |
| Germany | | (See Germany–Hungary relations): Germany has an embassy in Budapest.; Hungary has an embassy in Berlin.; Both countries are full members of the European Union and NATO. |
| Greece | | (See Greece–Hungary relations): Greece has an embassy in Budapest.; Hungary has an embassy in Athens.; Both countries are full members of the European Union and NATO. |
| Ireland | 1976 | Since 1991, Hungary has an embassy in Dublin and 2 honorary consulates (in Athlone and Cork).; Since 1996, Ireland has an embassy in Budapest.; Both countries are full members of the European Union and the Council of Europe.; There are approximately 8,034 Hungarians living in Ireland. |
| Italy | | Hungary has an embassy in Rome, a general consulate in Milan, and 11 honorary consulates (in Bari, Bologna, Florence, Genoa, Naples, Palermo, Perugia, Trieste, Turin, Venice and Verona).; The Kingdom of Lombardy–Venetia (today Lombardy, Veneto, South Tyrol, Trentino and Friuli-Venezia Giulia in Italy) and Hungary were crownlands of the Austrian Empire.; Italy has an embassy in Budapest and 3 honorary consulates (in Nyíregyháza, Pécs and Szeged).; Both countries are full members of the European Union and NATO. |
| Kosovo | | (See Hungary–Kosovo relations) Hungary recognized Kosovo on 19 March 2008.: Hungary has an embassy in Pristina.; Kosovo has an embassy in Budapest. |
| Latvia | 1921-07-21 | Diplomatic relations between the two states were renewed on September 2, 1991.; Hungary has an embassy and an honorary consulate in Riga.; Latvia has an embassy in Budapest.; Both countries are full members of NATO and of the European Union.; Latvian Ministry of Foreign Affairs about relations with Hungary |
| Lithuania | | Hungary has an embassy in Vilnius and an honorary consulate in Kaunas.; Lithuania has an embassy and an honorary consulate in Budapest.; Both countries are full members of NATO and of the European Union.; Lithuanian Ministry of Foreign affairs: list of bilateral treaties with Hungary (in Lithuanian only) |
| Luxembourg | | Hungary is accredited to Luxembourg from its embassy in Brussels, Belgium.; Luxembourg is accredited to Hungary from its embassy in Vienna, Austria.; Both countries are full members of the Organisation for Economic Co-operation and Development, of the European Union and of NATO. |
| Malta | 1964 | Hungary is accredited to Malta from its embassy in Rome, Italy and through an honorary consulate in Valletta.; Malta is accredited to Hungary from its embassy in Vienna, Austria and through an honorary consulate in Budapest.; Both countries are full members of the European Union.; Direction of the Hungarian representations in Malta; Direction of the Maltese representations in Hungary |
| Montenegro | | Hungary recognized Montenegro shortly after their declaration of independence.: Hungary has an embassy in Podgorica.; Montenegro has an embassy in Budapest.; Both countries are full members of the Council of Europe and NATO.; Hungary is an EU member and Montenegro is an candidate. |
| Netherlands | | (See Hungary–Netherlands relations): The Netherlands has an embassy in Budapest and an honorary consulate in Pécs.; Hungary has an embassy in The Hague and six honorary consulates (in Amsterdam, Arnhem, Aerdenhout, Winsum, 's-Hertogenbosch, and Curaçao).; Both countries are full members of the European Union and NATO.; Dutch Ministry of Foreign Affairs about relations with Hungary |
| North Macedonia | | Hungary has an embassy in Skopje.; North Macedonia has an embassy in Budapest.; Both countries are full members of the Council of Europe and NATO.; Hungary is an EU member and North Macedonia is an candidate. |
| Norway | 1920 | Both countries established diplomatic relations in 1920, but diplomatic representations were set up only in 1947–1948.; Hungary has an embassy in Oslo and 2 honorary consulates (in Stavanger and Sarpsborg).; Norway has an embassy in Budapest.; Both countries are full members of NATO. |
| Poland | | (See Hungary-Poland relations): Hungary has an embassy in Warsaw, a consulate-general in Kraków and a vice-consulate in Wrocław.; Poland has an embassy in Budapest.; Both countries are full members of the European Union and NATO. |
| Portugal | | Hungary has an embassy in Lisbon and 3 honorary consulates (in Funchal, Porto and Tavira).; Portugal has an embassy in Budapest.; Both countries are full members of the European Union and NATO. |
| Romania | 1920 | (See Hungary–Romania relations): Relations between the two states date back from the Middle Ages. Until the end of World War I, Transylvania, Banat, Crişana and Maramureş were part of the Kingdom of Hungary, after the war they became part of the Romanian territory.; Hungary has an embassy in Bucharest, 2 general consulates in Miercurea Ciuc and Cluj, and 4 honorary consulates in Iași, Constanța, Drobeta-Turnu Severin and Timișoara.; Romania has an embassy in Budapest and 2 general consulates in Gyula and Szeged.; Both countries are full members of the European Union and NATO. |
| Russia | | (See Hungary–Russia relations): Hungary has an embassy in Moscow and two consulate-generals (in Saint Petersburg and Yekaterinburg).; Russia has an embassy in Budapest and a consulate-general in Debrecen.; Both countries are full members of the Council of Europe and the Organization for Security and Co-operation in Europe.; Both countries legalized homosexuality while opposing same-sex marriages, and outlawed LGBT propaganda towards minors since 2013 (Russia) and 2021 (Hungary) respectively. |
| Serbia | 1882-11-21 | (See Hungary–Serbia relations): Hungary has an embassy in Belgrade and a general consulate in Subotica.; Serbia has an embassy in Budapest and an honorary consulate in Szeged.; Hungary is an EU member and Serbia is an candidate. |
| Slovakia | 1993 | (See Hungary–Slovakia relations): Before 1920, the territory which called Slovakia today was an integral part of the Kingdom of Hungary; Hungary has an embassy in Bratislava.; Slovakia has an embassy Budapest and a general consulate in Békéscsaba.; Both countries are full members of the European Union and NATO. |
| Slovenia | | (See Hungary–Slovenia relations): Both countries have an ethnic minority from the other state: in Hungary there are around 3,000 Ethnic Slovenes, and in Slovenia there are around 7,713 Ethnic Hungarians.; Hungary has an embassy in Ljubljana.; Slovenia has an embassy in Budapest and a general consulate in Szentgotthárd.; The countries share 102 km of common border.; Both are full members of NATO, European Union and the Schengen Agreement.; See also Hungarian Slovenes |
| Spain | 1938-01-13 | (See Hungary–Spain relations): Hungary has an embassy in Madrid, a consulate-general in Barcelona and 5 honorary consulates (in Gijón, Málaga, Palma de Mallorca, Tenerife, and Valencia).; Spain has an embassy in Budapest.; Both countries are full members of the European Union and NATO.; Spanish Ministry of Foreign Relations about the relation with Hungary (in Spanish only) |
| Sweden | 1945-12-28 | (See Hungary–Sweden relations): Hungary has an embassy in Stockholm.; Sweden has an embassy in Budapest.; Both countries are full members of the European Union and NATO. |
| Switzerland | | Hungary has an embassy in Bern and consulate in Geneva.; Switzerland has an embassy in Budapest.; Both countries are full members of the Council of Europe. |
| Ukraine | | (See Hungary–Ukraine relations): Hungary has an embassy in Kyiv, a consulate general in Uzhhorod, a consulate in Berehove and an honorary consulate in Lviv.; Ukraine has an embassy in Budapest and a general consulate in Nyíregyháza.; There are around 155,000 Hungarians in Ukraine who live in Ukraine, mostly in the Zakarpattia Oblast at the border with Hungary.; Both countries share 103 km of common border.; See also Hungarians in Ukraine; Hungarian consulate in Berehove (in Hungarian and Ukrainian only) |
| United Kingdom | 22 May 1921 | (See Hungary–United Kingdom relations) British Foreign Secretary Jeremy Hunt with Hungarian Foreign Minister Péter Szijjártó at a NATO summit in Chevening, October 2018. Hungary established diplomatic relations with the United Kingdom on 22 May 1921.: Hungary maintains an embassy in London.; The United Kingdom is accredited to Hungary through its embassy in Budapest.; Both countries share common membership of the Council of Europe, the European Court of Human Rights, the International Criminal Court, NATO, the OECD, the OSCE, the World Health Organization, and the World Trade Organization. Bilaterally the two countries have a Double Taxation Convention. |

=== Oceania ===
| Country | Formal Relations Began | Notes |
|---|---|---|
| Australia | 1972 | Australia is accredited to Hungary from its embassy in Vienna, Austria and maintains an honorary consulate in Budapest.; Hungary has an embassy in Canberra, a consulate-general in Sydney and four honorary consulate (in Adelaide, Brisbane, Melbourne and Perth).; Australian Department of Foreign Affairs and Trade about relations with Hungary |
| New Zealand | | Hungary has an embassy in Wellington.; New Zealand is accredited to Hungary from its embassy in Rome, Italy and maintains an honorary consulate in Budapest. |

== Foreign criticism ==
In December 2010, the Fidesz government adopted a press and media law which threatens fines on media that engage in "unbalanced coverage". The law aroused criticism in the European Union as possibly "a direct threat to democracy".

In 2013, the government adopted a new constitution that modified several aspects of the institutional and legal framework in Hungary. These changes have been criticized by the Council of Europe, the European Union and Human Rights Watch as possibly undermining the rule of law and human rights protection.

== See also ==
- List of diplomatic missions in Hungary
- List of diplomatic missions of Hungary
- Visa requirements for Hungarian citizens
- Nikola Gruevski former Prime Minister of Macedonia given asylum in 2018
- Marcin Romanowski Polish politician given asylum in 2024
- Zbigniew Ziobro Polish politician given asylum in 2026
