= Hungary–India relations =

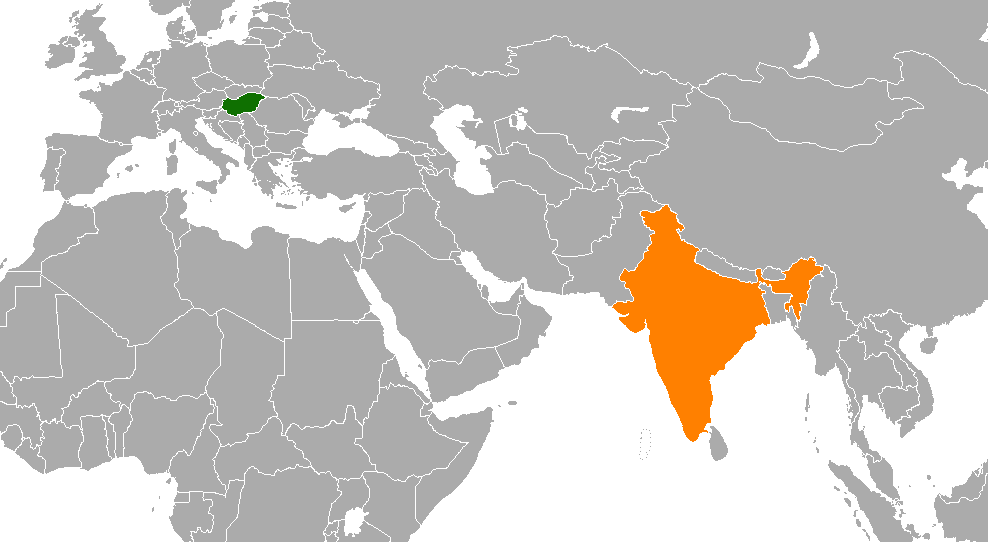

- Hungary: India

Hungary–India relations are the bilateral ties between India and Hungary. Indian embassy is located in Budapest and that of Hungary in New Delhi.

Both countries are full members of the World Trade Organization and United Nations.

== History ==
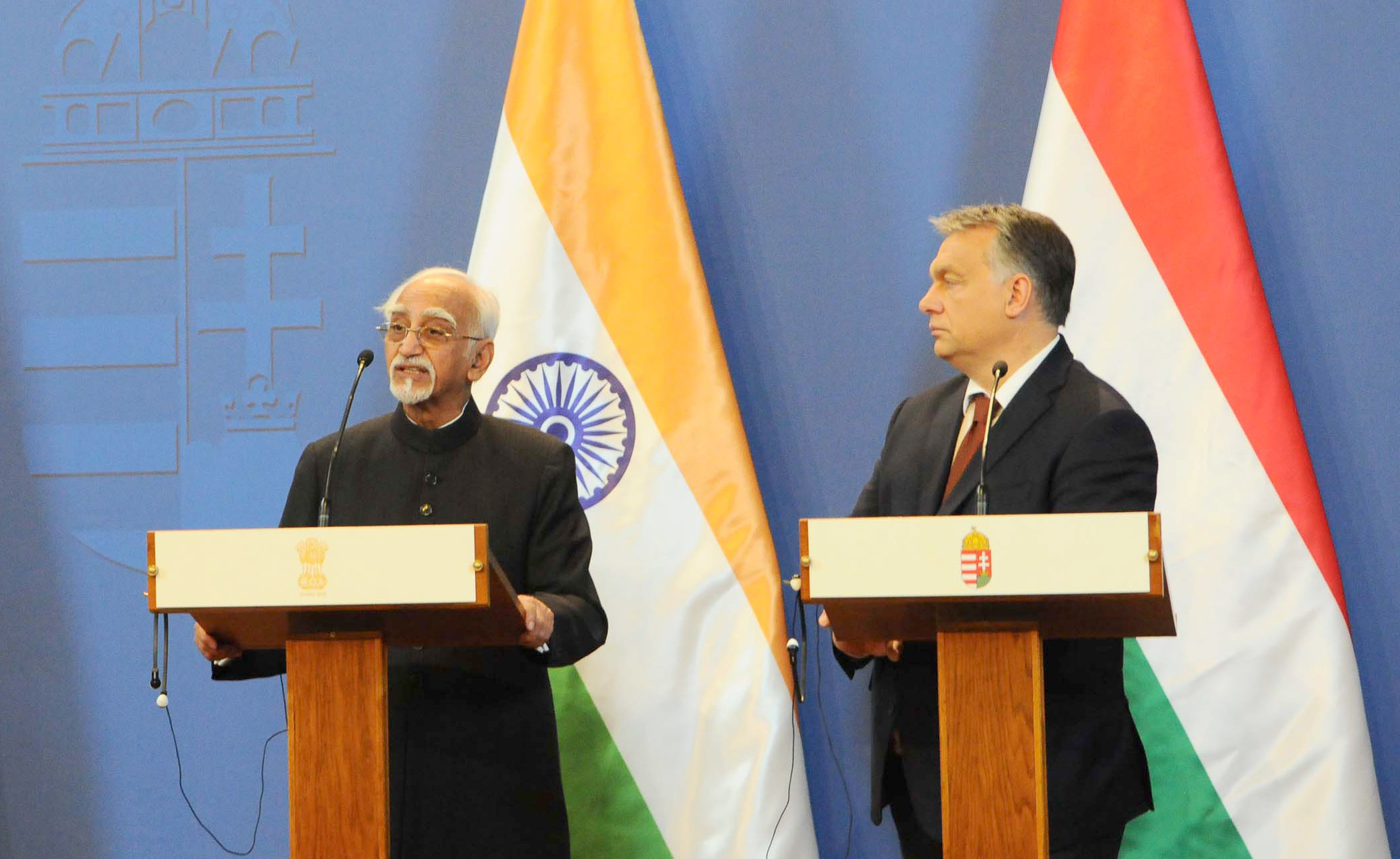
Prime Minister of Hungary Viktor Orbán and Vice President of India Mohammad Hamid Ansari in Budapest in 2016

Historically, Hungary and India enjoyed close and friendly relations when the diplomatic relations were set in 1948. India's role in the Hungarian Revolution of 1956 can not be forgotten; for saving the life by India's intervention with the then Soviet Union of Dr. Árpád Göncz who subsequently served as President of Hungary from 1990 to 2000. There have been regular visits at high level between the two sides. The period 2019-2020 was a particularly noteworthy year for bilateral interaction between the two countries as there were three ministerial visits within a period of six months; first, the visit of External Affairs Minister Dr. S. Jaishankar to Hungary in August 2019; second, the visit of India's Jal Shakti(hydro-power) Minister Mr. Gajendra Singh Shekhawat to Hungary in October 2019 for attending the Budapest Water Summit; and three, the visit of Hungary's Minister of Foreign Affairs and Trade Mr. Peter Szijjarto to India in January 2020. Mr. Vikas Swarup, Secretary(West) in the Ministry of External Affairs of India visited Hungary in January 2021 for the 10th round of Foreign Office Consultations.

In 2019, The Fidesz Hungarian government in Hungary has also expressed support for India on Kashmir and the Citizenship Amendment Act protests.

== Economic relations ==
The Hungarian exports have hitherto been confined to high technology, industrial products, automobiles, telecom and IT, but Mr. Orban's government is keen for developing exports in agricultural and food products and services, too. Indian companies have invested $2 billion in Hungary, but there is scope for more. There are various areas of cooperation, including collaboration on research and development, automotive components, healthcare, machine tools, agriculture machinery, non-conventional energy and electrical equipment, electronics, information technology, pharmaceuticals higher education, entertainment, etc. Indian investment in Hungary is almost US$2 billion and Indian firms provide employment to over 10,000 people in the country.

Bilateral trade between Hungary and India
Year	Indian Exports	Indian imports	Total Trade
	(in USD Million)	(in USD Million)	(in USD Million)
2015	364.9	213.4	578.3
2016	382.0	186.1	568.1
2017	437.3	229.0	666.2
2018	459.2	277.5	736.7
2019	489.6	254.5	744.1
2020 Jan-July	260.9	137.4	398.4

== Cultural relations ==
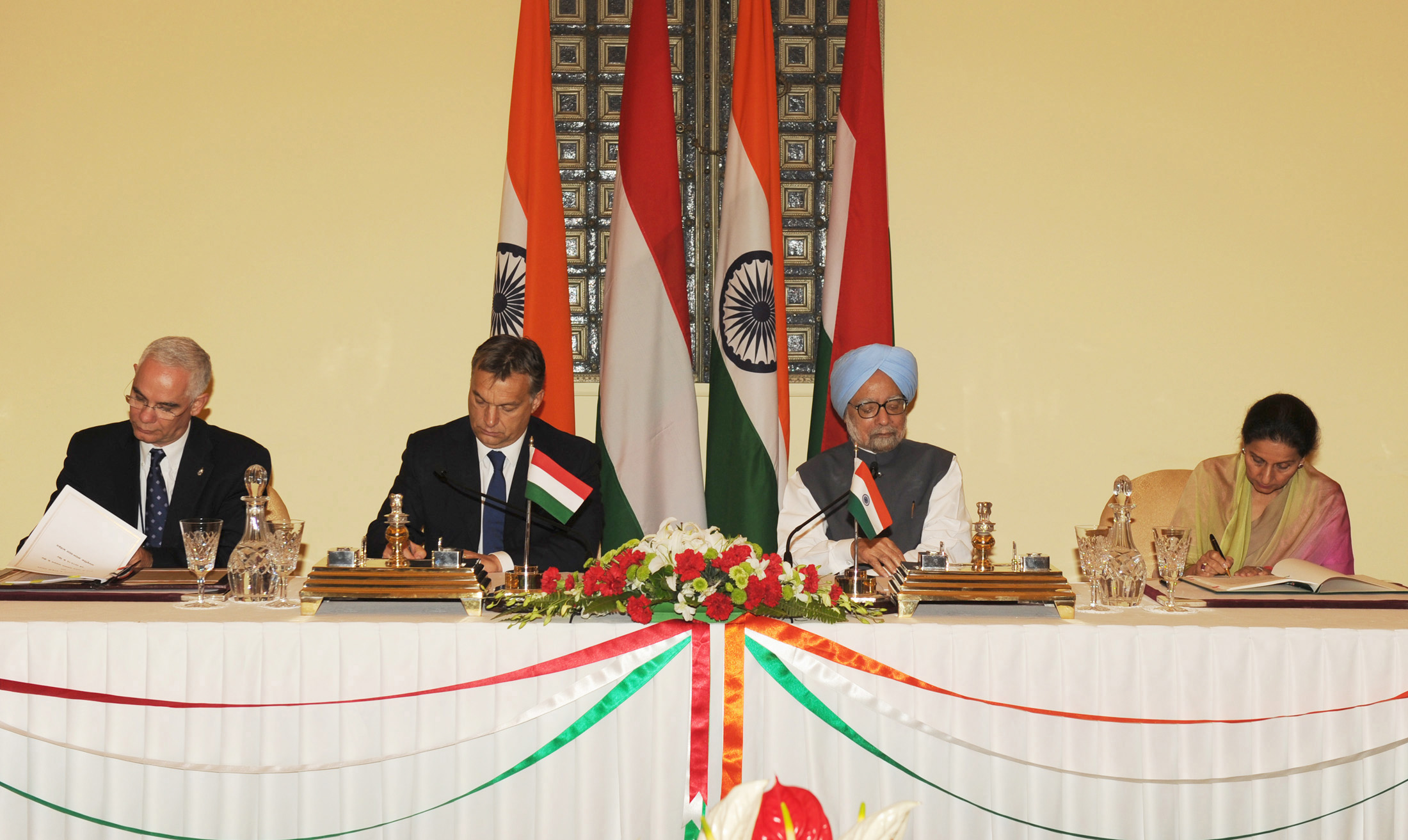
Signing of a Cultural Exchange Programme between Hungary and India in New Delhi in 2013

ICCR has been deputing a Visiting Professor of Hindi to the Department under the bilateral Cultural Exchange Program between India and Hungary, since 1992. Hungarians have shown considerable interest in Indian dances, music, yoga and meditations. There are more than 200 yoga centres and about 6 schools of Indian dances and music in Hungary. Indian cultural troupes visit Hungary from time to time. Prime Minister Manmohan Singh, in a speech, said that relations between the two countries have remained on a "steady course" over the years and both the countries would be each other's bridge to Europe and Asia. An interview-based video series created by the Embassy of India to bring out salient aspects of India Hungary bilateral relations was launched by Speaker of Hungarian National Assembly Mr. László Kövér and Ambassador of India Kumar Tuhin on 18 November 2020, the day of establishment of diplomatic relations between India and Hungary.

== Resident diplomatic missions ==
of Hungary in India

- Embassy (1): New Delhi
- Consulate Honorary (2): Chennai, Kolkata
- Consulate General (3): Mumbai, established and led by Consul General Dr. Norbert Révai-Bere since 2014

of India in Hungary

- Embassy (1): Embassy of India, Budapest

== See also ==
- Foreign relations of Hungary
- Foreign relations of India
