= Bulgaria–Hungary relations =

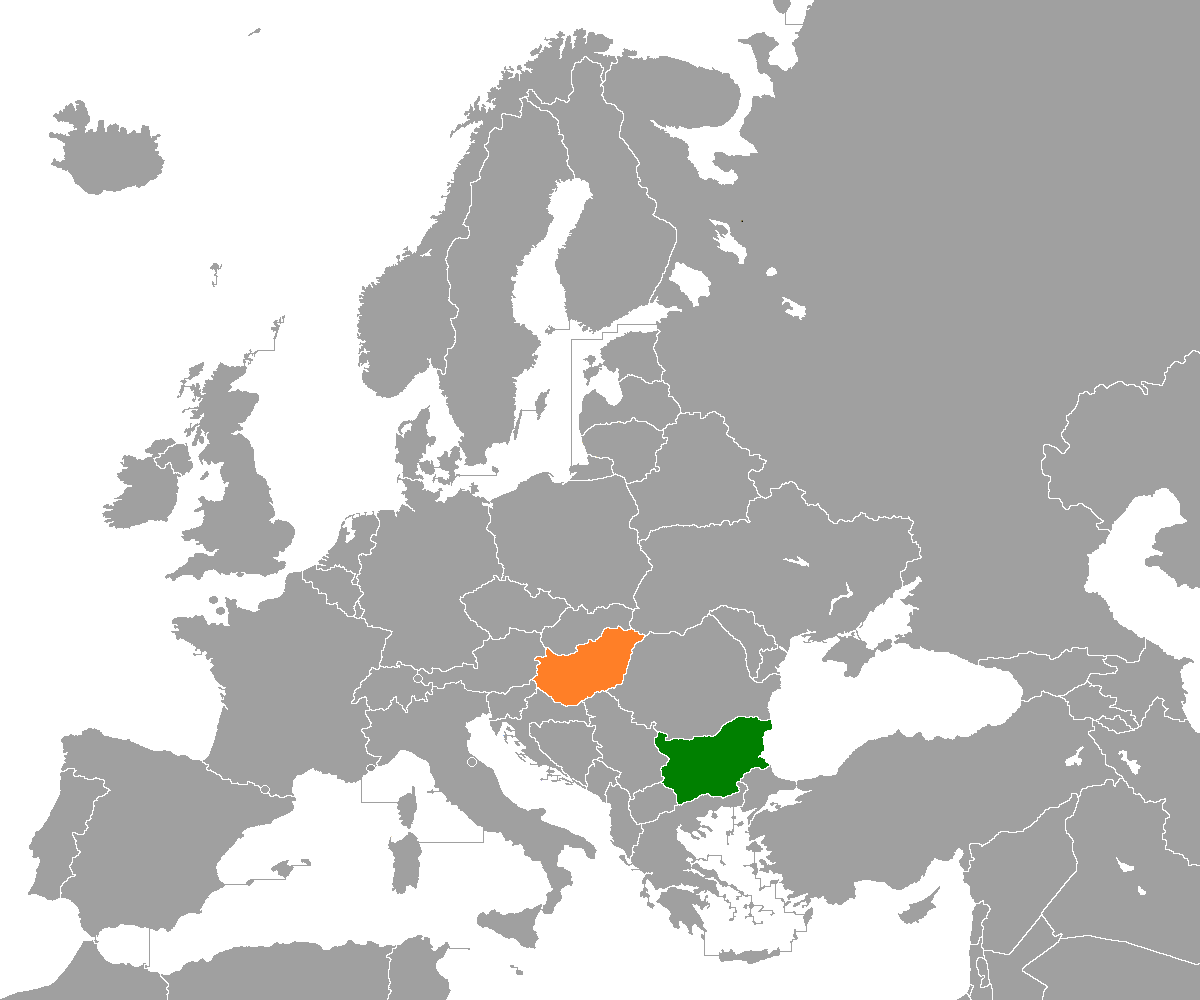

- Bulgaria: Hungary

Bulgaria–Hungary relations are foreign relations between Bulgaria and Hungary. In their current forms, these two countries have had diplomatic relations since 1920, though their historical relations date to the Middle Ages. Both countries are full members of the COE, EU and NATO. Hungary is an observer state of the BSCE, of which Bulgaria is a full member. Both countries are full members of the Southeast European Cooperative Initiative.

Since 2016, the two countries have commemorated their friendly relationship on 19 October, which is known in Bulgaria as the Day of Bulgarian-Hungarian Friendship (Bulgarian: Ден на българо-унгарското приятелство), and in Hungary as the Day of Hungarian-Bulgarian Friendship (Hungarian: Magyar–Bolgár Barátság Napja).

In 2025, Bulgaria’s Minister of Foreign Affairs stated that Bulgaria and Hungary “share excellent bilateral relations, rooted in deep historical and cultural ties”. Famously, both countries were historically under Ottoman rule, and were on the same side in both World War I and World War II.

Bulgaria has an embassy in Budapest. Hungary has an embassy in Sofia and an honorary consulate in Varna.

== EU ==
Bulgaria and Romania joined the EU in 2007. Hungary joined the EU in 2004.

== NATO ==
Bulgaria joined NATO in 2004. Hungary joined NATO in 1999.

== Resident diplomatic missions ==
- Bulgaria has an embassy in Budapest and honorary consulate in Kecskemét.
- Hungary has an embassy in Sofia and honorary consulate in Varna.

<

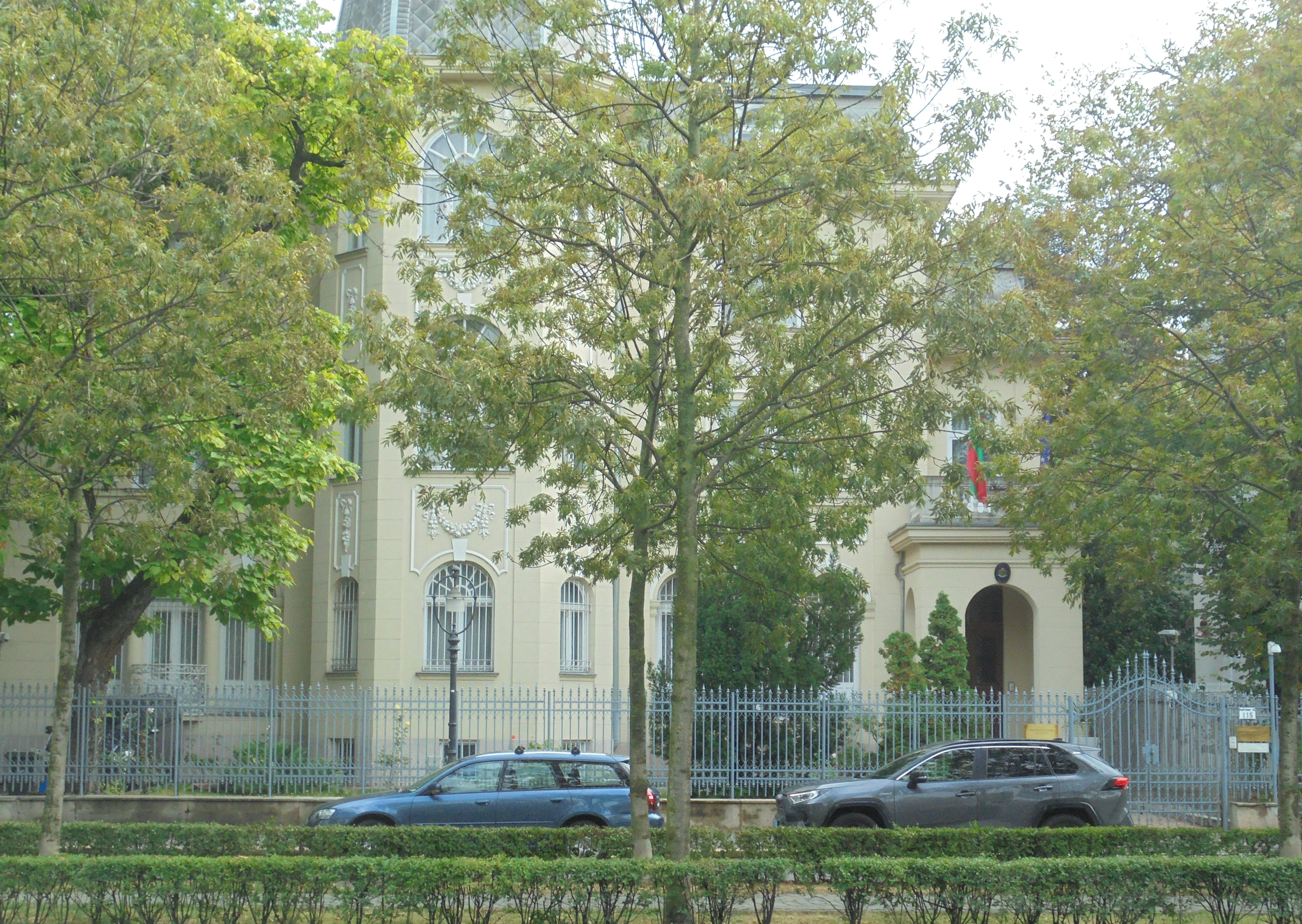
Embassy of Bulgaria in Budapest

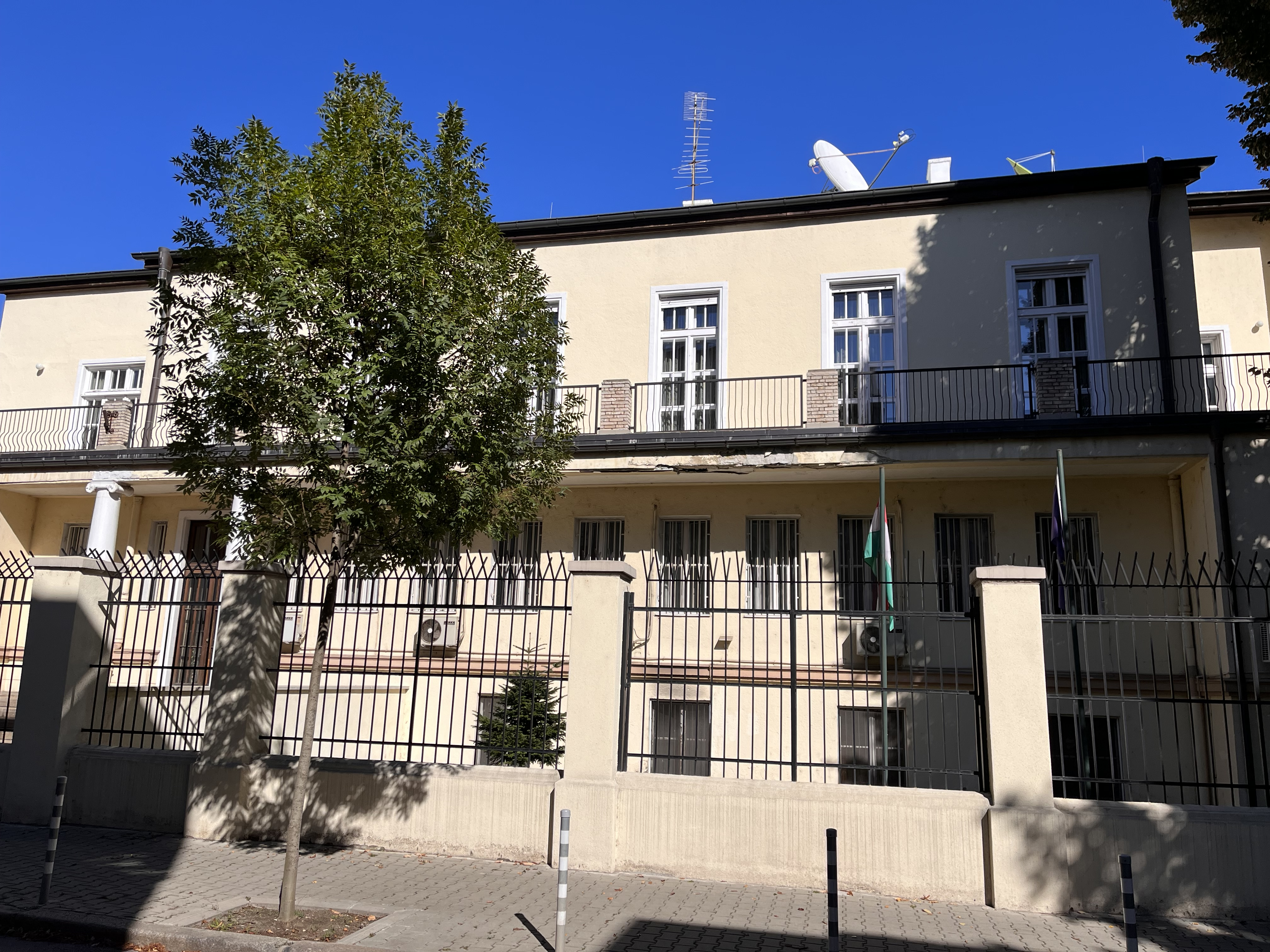
Embassy of Hungary in Sofia

== See also ==
- Foreign relations of Bulgaria
- Foreign relations of Hungary
- Bulgarians in Hungary
