= Hungary–Netherlands relations =

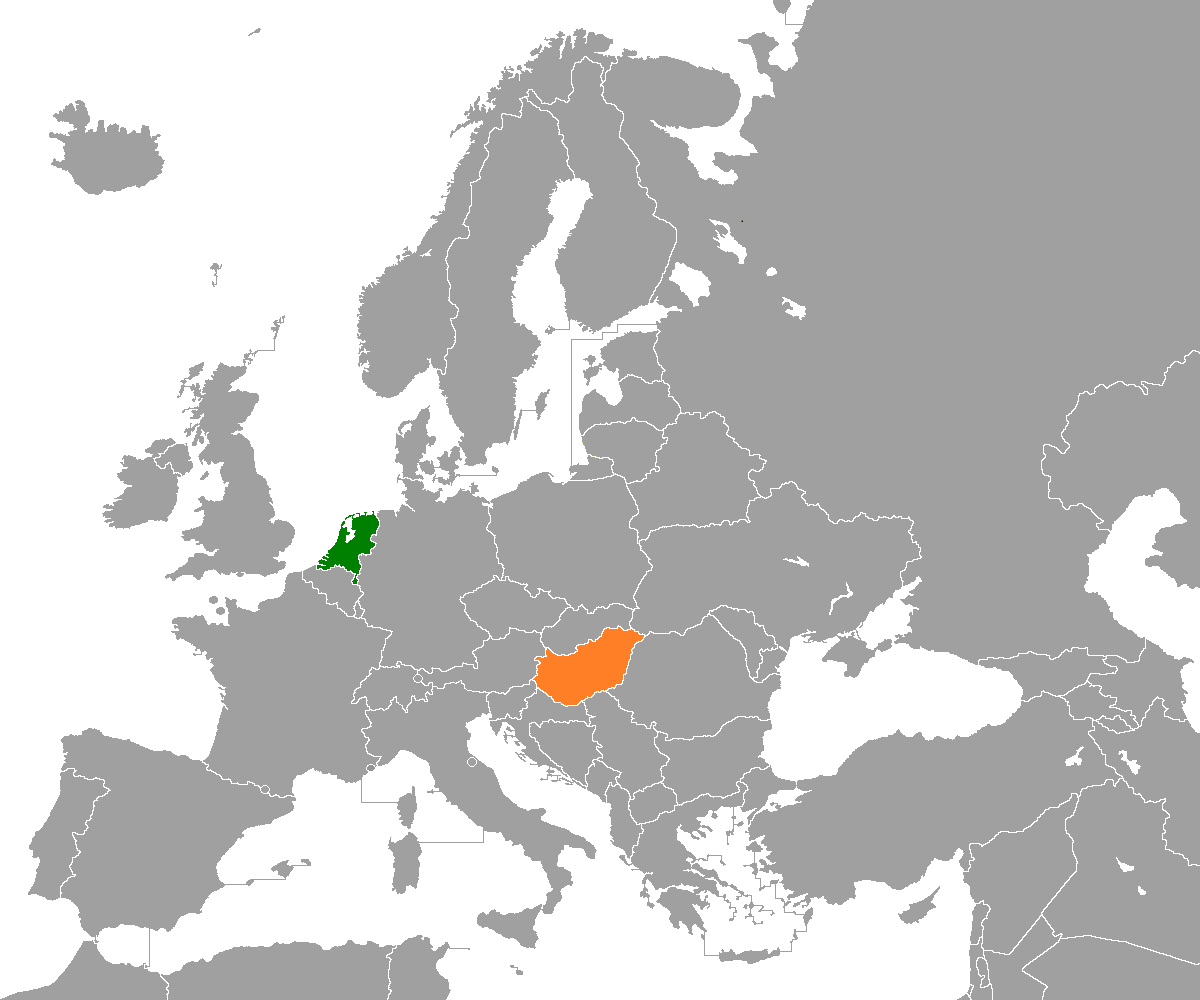

- Netherlands: Hungary

Hungary–Netherlands relations are foreign relations between the Netherlands and Hungary. The Netherlands have an embassy in Budapest. Hungary has an embassy in The Hague.

Both countries are full members of the Council of Europe, the European Union and NATO. The Netherlands gave full support to Hungary's membership in the European Union and NATO prior to them joining.

The current Ambassador of Hungary to the Netherlands is Dániel Horogszegi Szilágyi-Landeck since 2024. The current Ambassador of the Netherlands to Hungary is Désirée Bonis since 2021.

== The EU and NATO ==
While the Netherlands was one of the founding members of the EU, Hungary joined the EU in 2004. While the Netherlands was one of the founding members of NATO, Hungary joined NATO in 1999. the Netherlands fully supported Hungary's application to join NATO, which resulted in membership on 12 March 1999, and then the European Union, which resulted in membership on 1 May 2004.

== Resident diplomatic missions ==
- Hungary has an embassy in The Hague.
- the Netherlands has an embassy in Budapest.
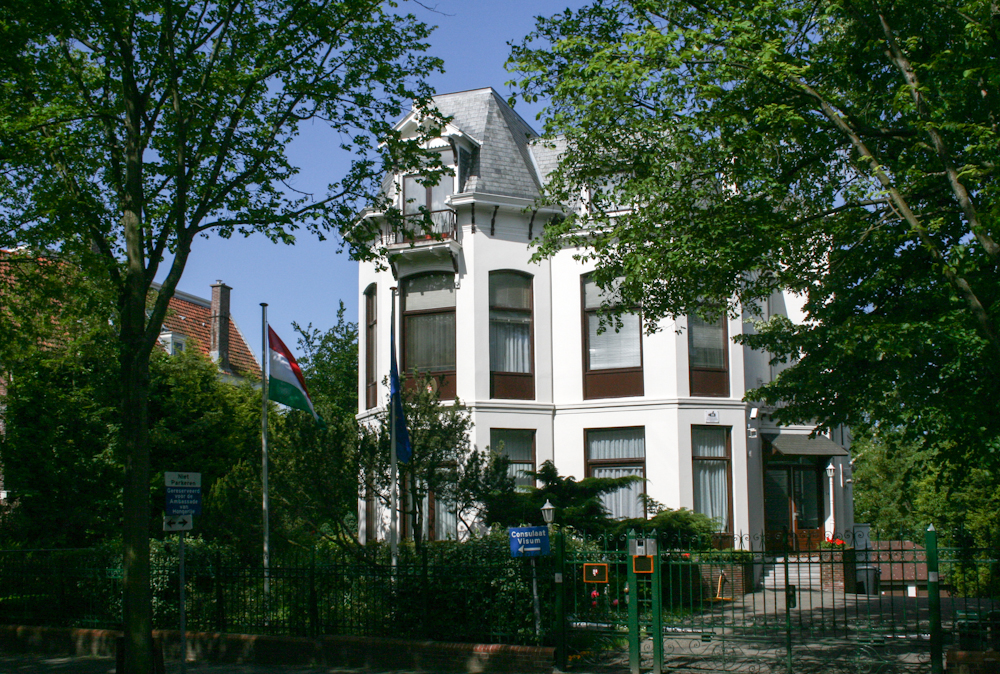
Embassy of Hungary in The Hague

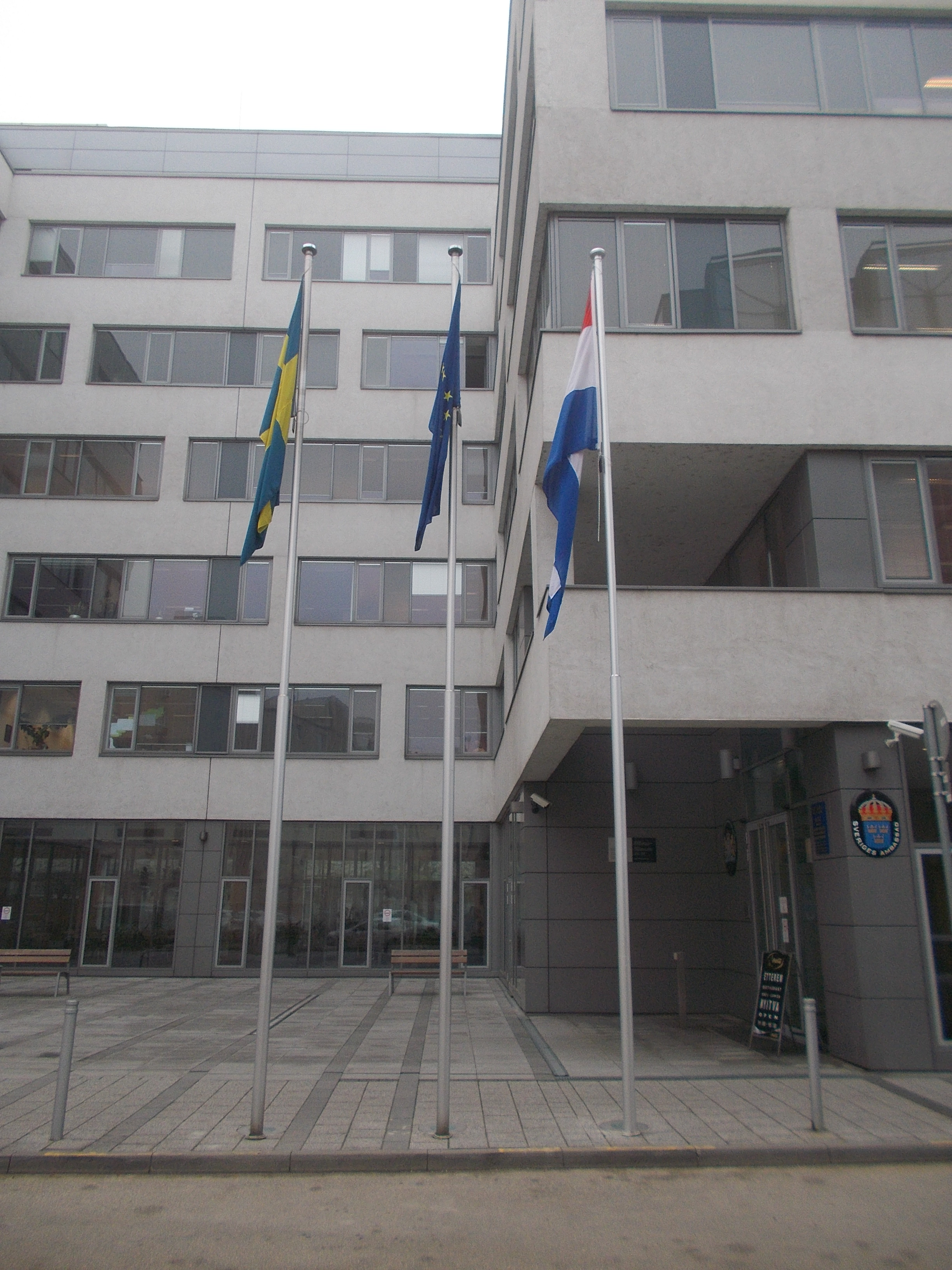
Embassy of the Netherlands in Budapest

== See also ==
- Foreign relations of Hungary
- Foreign relations of the Netherlands
- Hungarians in the Netherlands
