= Hungary–Spain relations =

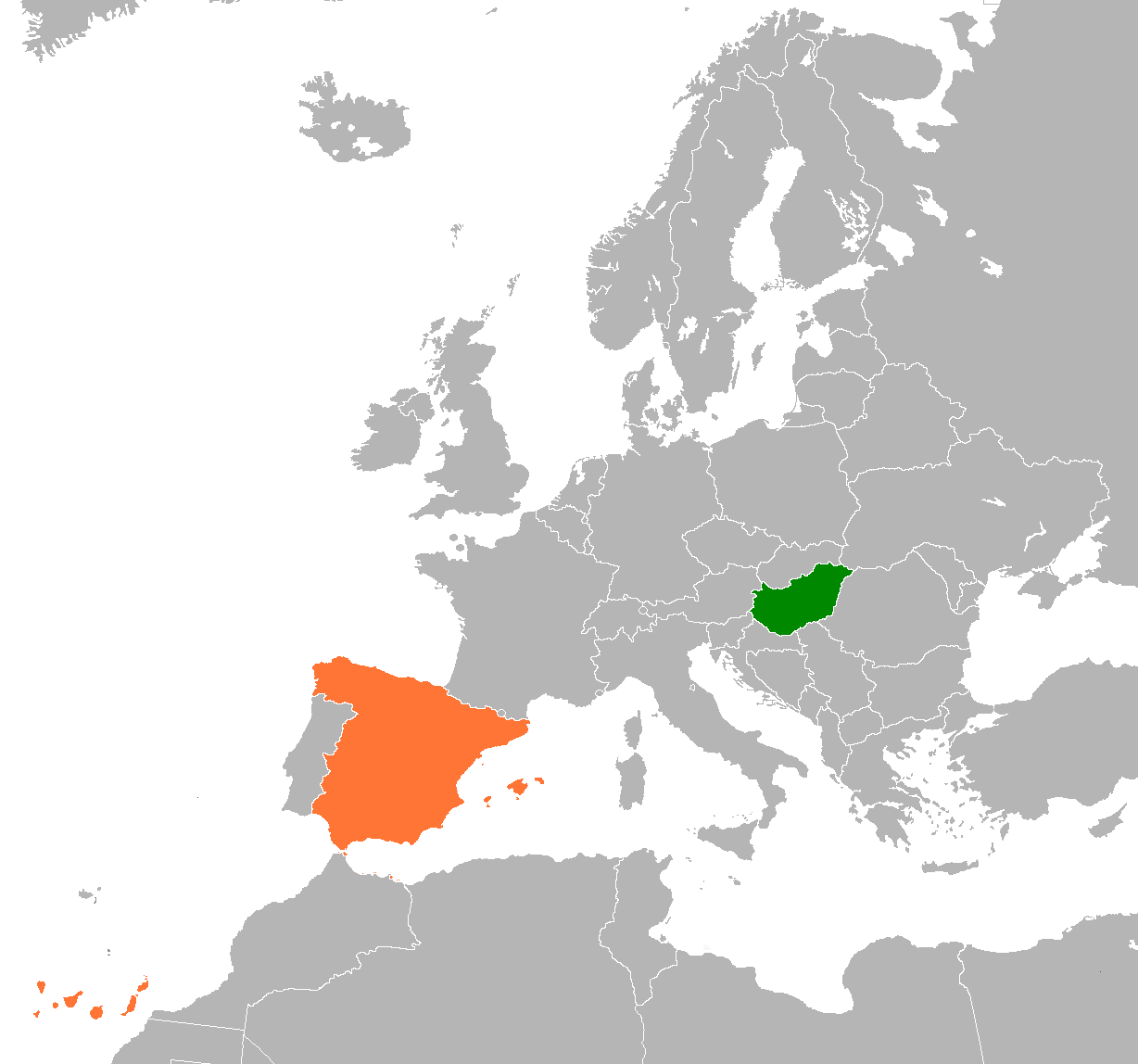

- Hungary: Spain

Hungary–Spain relations are the bilateral relations between Hungary and the Kingdom of Spain. Both nations are members of the Council of Europe, European Union, NATO, OECD and the United Nations. Spain has given full support to Hungary's membership in the European Union and NATO.

== History ==
Historically, Hungary (as part of the Austro-Hungarian Empire) and Spain were both ruled by the House of Habsburg for a few centuries. As such, both empires were allies in several wars such as the Thirty Years' War and the Ottoman–Habsburg wars. In October 1918, the Kingdom of Hungary became independent after the Dissolution of Austria-Hungary.

During the Spanish Civil War, over 1,000 Hungarian volunteers fought for the Republican faction. The Hungarian volunteers had their own battalion known as the Rakosi Battalion. In February 1938 Hungary, led by Miklós Horthy, officially recognized the government of Francisco Franco.

In 1945, soon after the end World War II, Spain broke diplomatic relations with Hungary after that nation became a communist country. In January 1977, both nations re-established diplomatic relations.

As of 2021, bilateral relations between Hungary and Spain were good on a political level. At the time there was no known dispute between the two countries. In 2017, both nations celebrated 40 years of diplomatic relations.

In August 2024 the Spanish government blocked a €600mn bid from Hungarian consortium Ganz-Mavag, a consortium backed by an investment arm of the Hungarian state and by Viktor Orban, for a Spanish trainmaker named Talgo over national security concerns. 45% of the consortium owned by Corvinus, a Hungarian state-owned development finance institution, and the balance "by Hungarian trainmaker Magyar-Vagon, which is controlled by a private equity fund owned by an executive named Csaba Törő and managed through a subsidiary by Hungarian oil company Mol. Hungarian state-owned Eximbank, one of the main overseas financing tools for the Hungarian government, agreed to provide a €345mn loan to Ganz-Mavag, equalling more than half of the offer price." Spain's National Intelligence Center and the Department of National Security wrote negative reports to Minister of Transport Óscar Puente. "Talgo has developed a proprietary variable-gauge vehicle system that allows its high speed trains to automatically adapt to railway tracks with different gauges, permitting for quick cross-border travel. There are concerns that if Ganz-Mávag were to acquire Talgo, its designs could be shared with Moscow."

In January 2025, The Spanish Minister of Foreign Affairs, European Union and Cooperation, José Manuel Albares met with Hungarian Minister of Foreign Affairs and Trade,Péter Szijjártó in Madrid to discuss trade, cultural, and travel co-operations, such as concerning the 1,211 students in primary and 15,131 in secondary education studying Spanish in Hungary(as of 2023/2024). Péter Szijjártó also made comments regarding African partnerships, citing "Unless we help African countries in this area it could easily lead to a humanitarian disaster or a greater migratory pressure than ever before”, and “We want to see an even closer cooperation between Europe and Africa to enable countries in Africa to face the challenges of a rapidly growing population”.

== Bilateral agreements ==
Both nations have signed several bilateral agreements such as:

- Judicial Settlement and Arbitration Treaty (1929);
- Air Transport Agreement (1974);
- Agreement on Commercial Exchanges, Navigation, Transport and the Development of Economic, Industrial and Technical Cooperation (1976);
- Agreement for Scientific and Technical Cooperation (1979);
- Cultural and Scientific Cooperation Agreement (1982);
- Tourism Cooperation Agreement (1982);
- Consular Agreement (1982);
- Agreement to Avoid Double Taxation and Prevent Tax Evasion in matters of Income and Wealth Taxes (1984);
- Agreement on Reciprocal Enforcement of Judicial Resolutions in criminal matters (1987);
- Agreement on Mutual Recognition of Certificates and Academic Titles (1989);
- Agreement for the Promotion and Reciprocal Protection of Investments (1989);
- Treaty of Friendship and Cooperation (1992).

== Resident diplomatic missions ==
- Hungary has an embassy in Madrid and a consulate-general in Barcelona.
- Spain has an embassy in Budapest.
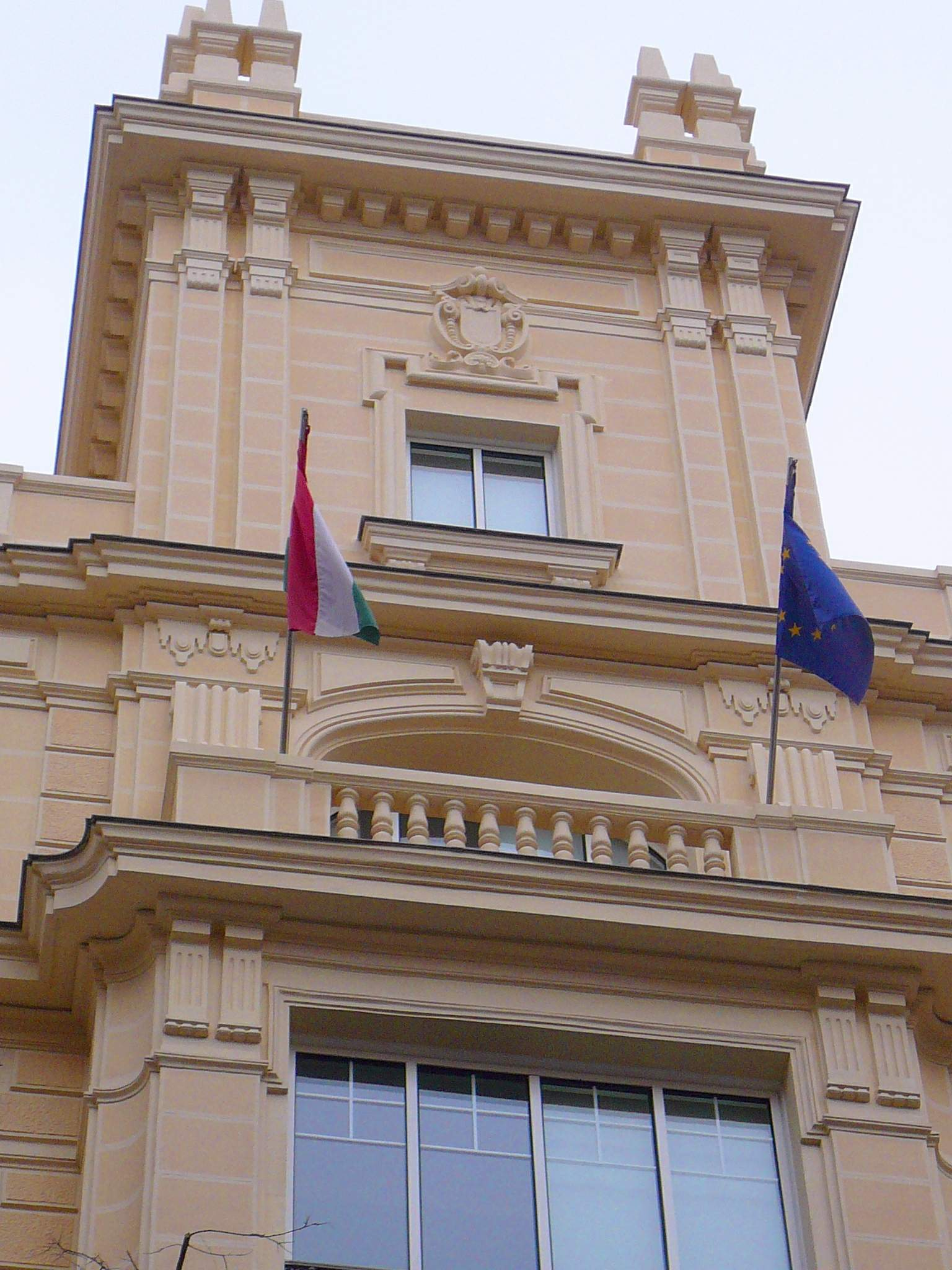
Embassy of Hungary in Madrid

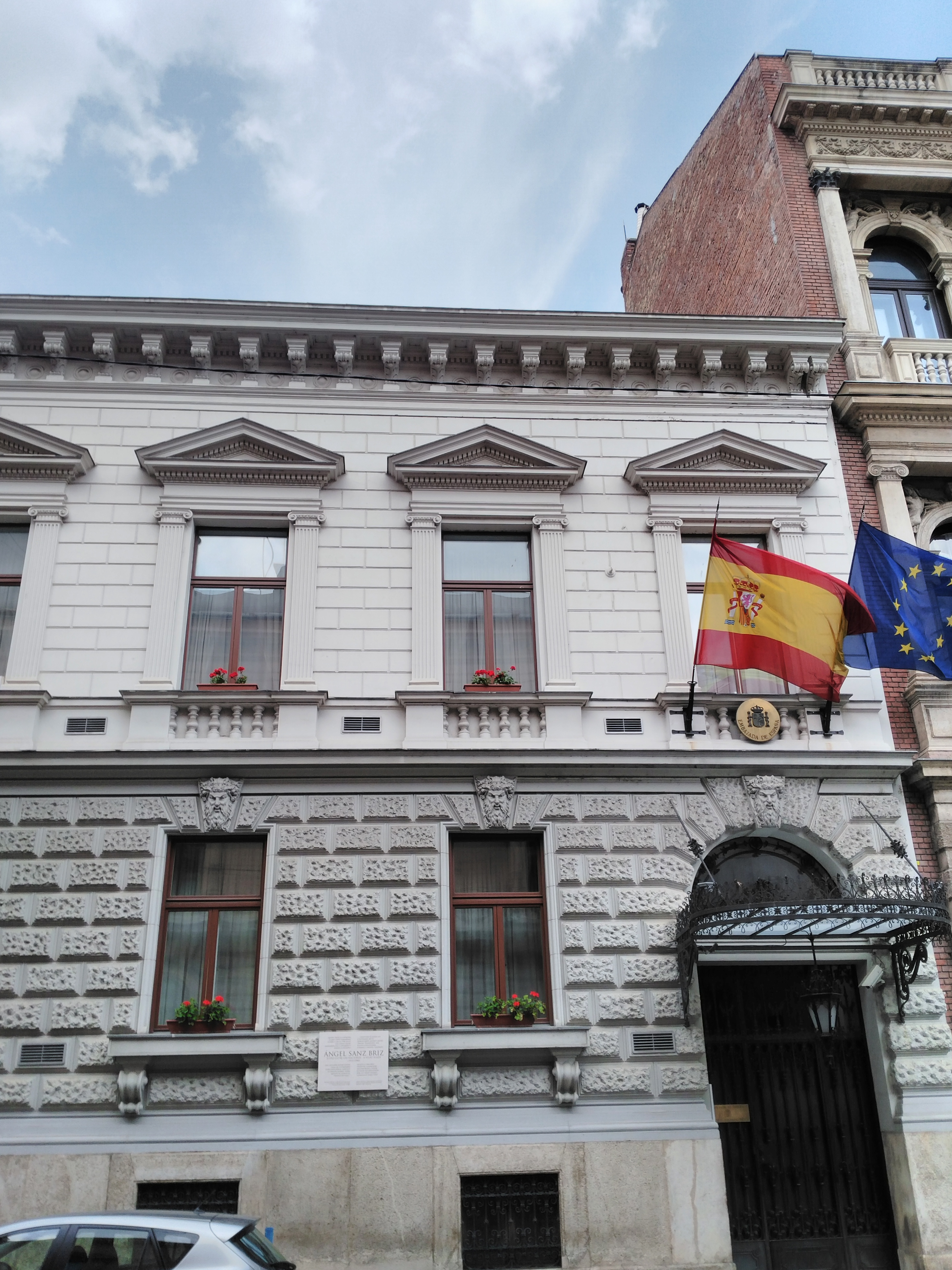
Embassy of Spain in Budapest

== See also ==
- Foreign relations of Hungary
- Foreign relations of Spain
- Immigration to Hungary
- Immigration to Spain
