= Hungary–Israel relations =

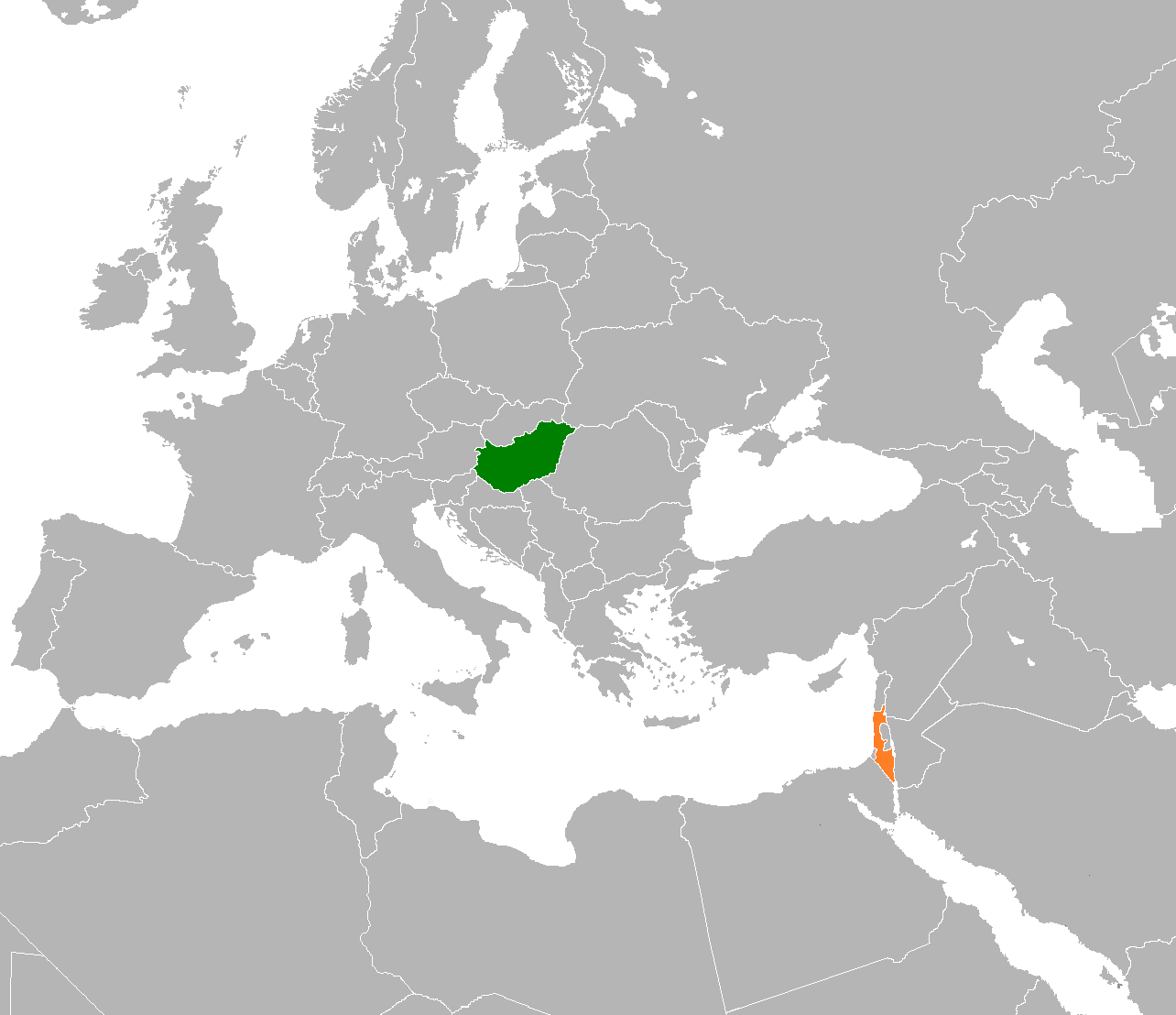

- Hungary: Israel

Diplomatic mission
- Embassy of Hungary, Tel Aviv: Embassy of Israel, Budapest

Hungary–Israel relations are the foreign relations between Hungary and Israel. Hungary has an embassy in Tel Aviv and four honorary consulates (in Eilat, Haifa, Jerusalem and Tel Aviv). Israel has an embassy in Budapest and an honorary consulate in Szeged.

According to the Israeli Central Bureau for Statistics, there were 47,500 Jews living in Hungary in 2018. Both countries are full members of the Union for the Mediterranean.

Both countries have stressed the importance of increasing trade and tourism between one another.

An estimated 30,000 Hungarian Jews emigrated to Israel in 1948.

== History ==
=== 20th century ===
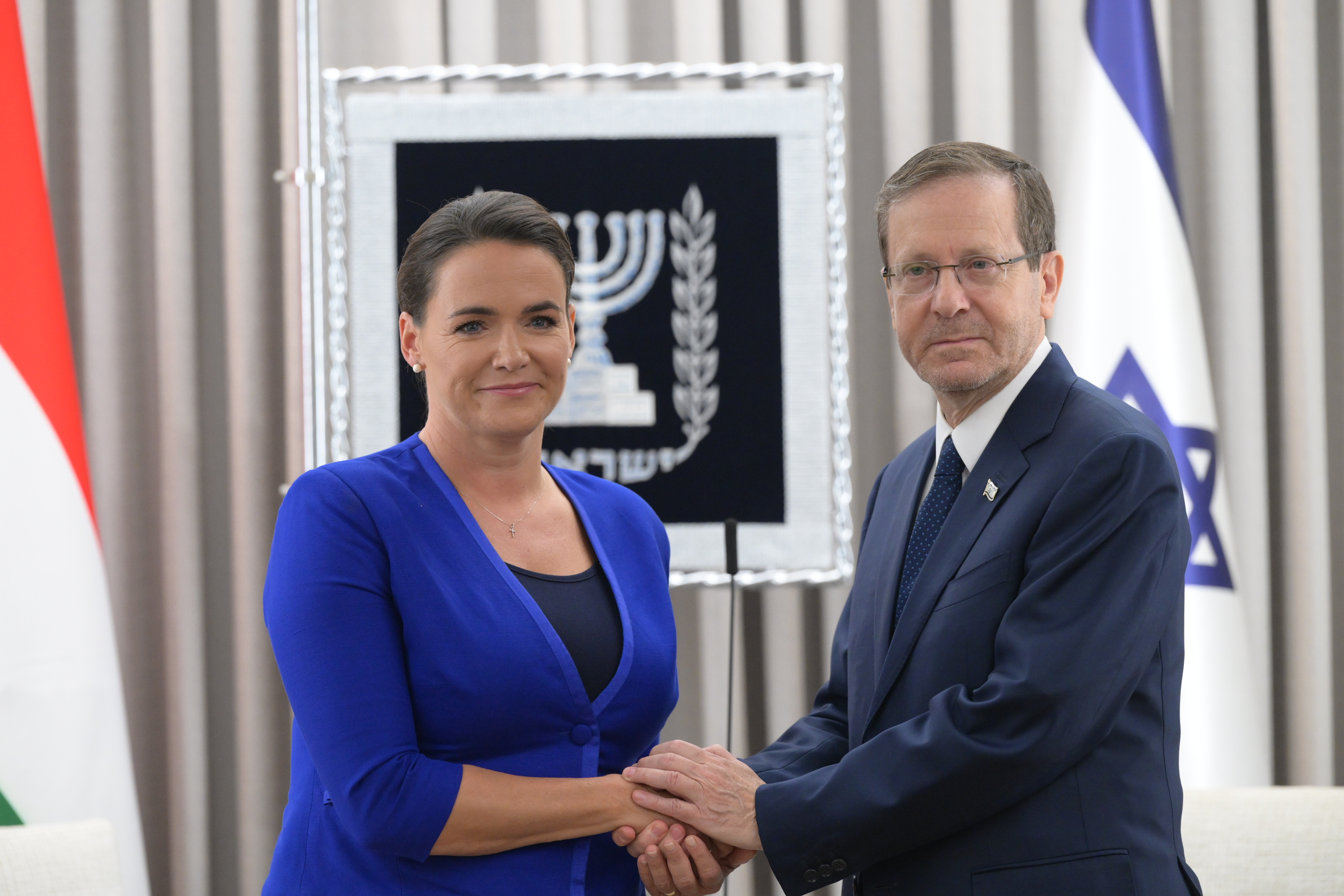
Hungarian President Katalin Novák with Israeli President Isaac Herzog in Jerusalem, 5 November 2023

During the first half of the 20th century, many Hungarian Jews had been suffering from antisemitism. The Nazis killed 564,000 Hungarian Jews in 1944 – during the Holocaust.

The diplomatic relations between Hungary and the State of Israel were officially established in 1949. Hungary opened a legation in Israel, along with other countries from the Eastern Bloc in 1952. Hungary severed its relations with Israel after the Six-Day War, like many other countries from Eastern Europe, as a result of that, the Hungarian legation in Israel closed.

In the late-1980s Mikhail Gorbachev started reforms of democratization in the USSR. The Hungarian leader János Kádár agreed with Gorbachev's reforms, and its country became closer to the western countries. The first unofficial ties between the countries started in September 1987, when Hungary and Israel opened non-resident interest offices for each other. The official diplomatic relations have fully restored in 1989.

During the mass emigration of Soviet Jews in the late 1980s and early 1990s, Hungary played a critical transit role between the Soviet Union and Israel. With no direct flights permitted between Moscow and Tel Aviv until late 1991, Hungary emerged as a logistical bridge; between 1989 and 1991, more than 160,000 Soviet Jewish refugees traveled through Budapest on their way to Israel. This operation was supported by a joint agreement between Malév Hungarian Airlines and the Jewish Agency. Hungary’s involvement reflected its shift toward a pro-Western and human rights-oriented foreign policy, even as the country navigated internal democratic transition and external security threats tied to Middle Eastern tensions.

=== 21st century ===
In the 21st century, Hungary is known as one of the closest allies of Israel in Europe, breaking the European consensus many times and standing on Israel's side. The Hungarian and Israeli leaders have both made official visits many times.

In July 2018, Hungarian Prime Minister Viktor Orbán visited Israel.

In 2019, Hungary opened a trade office in Jerusalem, recognizing it as an integral part of Israel de facto.

On 21 May 2020, the Hungarian Minister of Foreign Affairs has spoken to his Israeli colleague and told him that "Hungary will always stand beside Israel". He also criticized Europe for its "politic hypocrisy". Later that year, the two countries have decided to co-operate in the field of Space-research.

On 18 May 2021, Hungary blocked the EU from taking a formal position on 2021 Israel–Palestine crisis. Hungary's Foreign Minister Péter Szijjártó accused the EU of opposing Israel. "I have a general problem with these European statements on Israel," he said. "These are usually very much one-sided, and these statements do not help, especially not under current circumstances, when the tension is so high."

In January 2022, Israeli Prime Minister Naftali Bennett thanked his Hungarian counterpart, Prime Minister Viktor Orbán, for the Hungarian government’s consistent support of Israel at international forums.

In October 2023, against the background of the beginning of Gaza war, Orbán made pro-Israel statements: "Hungary will not allow any rallies supporting "terrorist organisations," he said, as cited by Reuters; "It is shocking that there are sympathy rallies supporting the terrorists across Europe," Orban said, referencing the European fallout from the Hamas attack on Israel." as reported by Reuters.

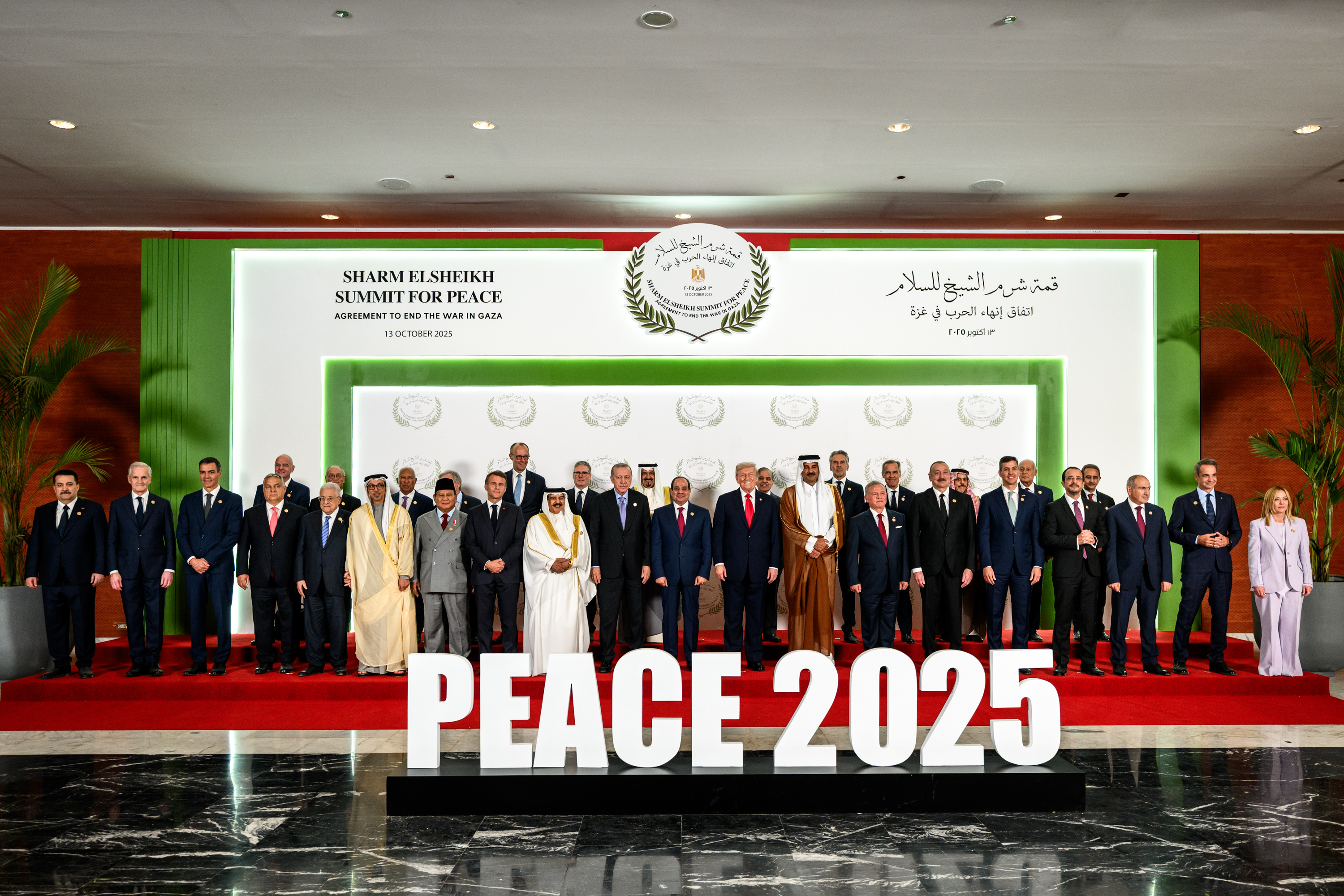
Orbán at the Gaza peace summit in Sharm El Sheikh, Egypt, 13 October 2025

In September 2024, amid reports of exploding pagers and walkie-talkies in Lebanon, early investigations revealed the devices used were not manufactured by the Tavisa-freed company, Gold Apollo, but manufactured by a Budapest-based company licensed to reuse the Gold Apollo name.

In April 2025, Israeli Prime Minister Benjamin Netanyahu visited Budapest, despite the International Criminal Court's arrest warrant for Netanyahu for alleged war crimes and crimes against humanity in the Gaza Strip. Orbán announced that Hungary would be withdrawing from the ICC due to its attempted prosecution of Israeli officials.

In July 2025, Hungary banned Irish rap trio Kneecap for three years ahead of festival, citing national security threat over support for Hamas and Hezbollah.

== Trade ==
Israel and Hungary trade is also influenced by the EU - Israel Free Trade Agreement from 1995.

Israel - Hungary trade in millions USD-$
	Israel import Hungary exports	Hungary imports Israel exports	Total trade value
2023	391.7	248.9	640.6
2022	358.1	146.1	504.2
2021	313.5	153.1	466.6
2020	244.8	126.1	370.9
2019	261.2	128.5	389.7
2018	301.1	138.2	439.3
2017	272.2	129.6	401.8
2016	372.7	120.7	493.4
2015	283.8	123.8	407.6
2014	304.7	169.7	474.4
2013	272.8	160.8	433.6
2012	390.3	189	579.3
2011	260	152.8	412.8
2010	268.6	106.9	375.5
2009	252.4	113.1	365.5
2008	288.8	174.5	463.3
2007	195.6	116.3	311.9
2006	399.1	97.6	496.7
2005	144.1	75.5	219.6
2004	171	78	249
2003	110.3	63.1	173.4
2002	77.3	50.8	128.1

== Tourism ==
Hungary is very popular among Israeli tourists, and since 1994 Hungary and Israel have visa-free agreement.

Arrivals between Hungary and Israel (2016-2023)
	2023	2022	2021	2020	2019	2018	2017	2016
Passengers flying between Israel and Hungary	577,985	535,900	166,529	99,843	555,831	462,474	387,342	301,228
Tourists from Hungary visiting Israel	23,100	16,100	1,400	9,400	39,100	31,100	22,400	16,500

== Resident diplomatic missions ==
- Hungary has an embassy in Tel Aviv.
- Israel has an embassy in Budapest.

== See also ==
- Foreign relations of Hungary
- Foreign relations of Israel
- History of the Jews in Hungary
