= List of ambassadors of Hungary to the United States =

Ambassador of Hungary to the United States
- Magyar nagykövet az Egyesült Államokban
- Incumbent; László Szabó since September 8, 2017
- Inaugural holder: Ferdinand von Wydenbruck
- Formation: January 25, 1865

The Hungarian ambassador in Washington, D. C. is the official representative of the Government in Budapest to the Government of the United States.

- Till 1920 he was listed as Austria-Hungary

== List of representatives ==
Diplomatic agrément	Diplomatic accreditation	ambassador	Observations	List of heads of state of Hungary	List of presidents of the United States	Term end
January 25, 1865		Ferdinand von Wydenbruck	(1816–1878)	Franz Joseph I of Austria	Andrew Johnson	August 11, 1867
July 3, 1868		Carl Ramon Soter von Lederer	(1817–1890)	Franz Joseph I of Austria	Ulysses S. Grant	March 12, 1874
March 12, 1874		Wilhelm Schwarz-Senborn	(1813–1903)	Franz Joseph I of Austria	Ulysses S. Grant	March 8, 1875
June 23, 1875		Ladislaus von Hoyos-Sprinzenstein	( Born 25 August 1834 - Mauer bei Wien, Austria	Franz Joseph I of Austria	Rutherford B. Hayes	August 28, 1878
December 25, 1878		Ernst von Mayr		Franz Joseph I of Austria	James A. Garfield	October 30, 1881
October 30, 1881		Ignaz von Schäffer	1856 envoy in London	Franz Joseph I of Austria	Grover Cleveland	October 9, 1886
April 5, 1987		Ernst Schmit von Tavera	Envoy Extraordinary and Minister Plenipotentiary (1839-1904)	Franz Joseph I of Austria	Grover Cleveland	
November 1, 1894		Alexander von Mezey Ezathmär	Counselor of Legation (NOT Chargé d'affaires)	Franz Joseph I of Austria	Grover Cleveland	
December 29, 1894		Ladislaus Hengelmüller von Hengervár		Franz Joseph I of Austria	Grover Cleveland	
December 27, 1902			LEGATION RAISED TO EMBASSY	Franz Joseph I of Austria	Theodore Roosevelt	
December 27, 1902	January 1, 1907	Ladislaus Hengelmüller von Hengervár	February 23, 1910 Dean of the Diplomatic corps	Franz Joseph I of Austria	Theodore Roosevelt	
April 24, 1913		Konstantin Dumba		Franz Joseph I of Austria	Woodrow Wilson	
October 6, 1915		Baron Erich Zwiedinek von Südenhorst	Chargé d'affaires	Franz Joseph I of Austria	Woodrow Wilson	
November 9, 1916		Adam Tarnowski (senior)	(1866–1946)	Charles I of Austria	Woodrow Wilson	April 8, 1917
May 1, 1917			EMBASSY REMOVED	Charles I of Austria	Woodrow Wilson	
January 11, 1922			Legation of Hungary opened	Miklós Horthy	Warren G. Harding	
January 11, 1922		László Széchenyi		Miklós Horthy	Warren G. Harding	
December 28, 1933		John Pelenyi	Janos Pelenyi (1885-1974) Resignation: John Pelenyi, Hungarian Minister to Washington since 1933 and a career diplomat for 33 years, resigned his post and announced his intention to remain in this country indefinitely as a private citizen. He gave no reason.	Miklós Horthy	Franklin D. Roosevelt	
November 28, 1940		Stephen de Rothkugel	Chargé d'affaires	Miklós Horthy	Franklin D. Roosevelt	
March 19, 1941	April 3, 1941	George de Ghika	1939: George De Ghika, who was Consul- General for Hungary in New York, has been appointed Hungarian Minister to Japan	Miklós Horthy	Franklin D. Roosevelt	
December 13, 1941			ANNOUNCEMENT OF STATE OF WAR	Miklós Horthy	Franklin D. Roosevelt	
January 10, 1946			LEGATION RE-OPENED	Zoltán Tildy	Harry S. Truman	
January 10, 1946	January 18, 1946	Aladár Szegedy-Maszák	(*1904 March 25, 1988)	Zoltán Tildy	Harry S. Truman	
July 11, 1947		Paul Marik		Zoltán Tildy	Harry S. Truman	
September 30, 1947	October 8, 1947	Rustem Vambery		Zoltán Tildy	Harry S. Truman	
May 18, 1948		Andrew Sik		Árpád Szakasits	Harry S. Truman	
July 20, 1948	August 4, 1948	Andrew Sik		Árpád Szakasits	Harry S. Truman	
October 1, 1949			Listed as Hungarian People's Republic	Árpád Szakasits	Harry S. Truman	
September 29, 1949	October 17, 1949	Imre Horváth	(1901-1958): Born into a worker's family in 1901, Imre Horvath started out as a fitter's apprentice. Later he attended a poly- technical; From 1951 to 1953 he was ambassador in London, On July 30, 1956, the Hungarian State Assembly elected Irnre Horvath Foreign Minister.	Árpád Szakasits	Harry S. Truman	
August 2, 1951	August 7, 1951	Emil Weil	(1897-1954)	Sándor Rónai	Harry S. Truman	
April 8, 1953		Péter Kós	Ambassador carried as absent, Chargé d'affaires	István Dobi	Dwight D. Eisenhower	
August 28, 1953	September 26, 1953	Károly Szabó (Ambassador to the United States)		István Dobi	Dwight D. Eisenhower	
June 27, 1956	July 17, 1956	Péter Kós	1921: Educated, University of Budapest, Doctor of Chemistry.; 1949: Ministry of Foreign Affairs, head of section; 1956: Envoy to Indonesia.; From 1969 to 1972 he was ambassador in New Delhi.	István Dobi	Dwight D. Eisenhower	
1957	1962	Tibor Zádor	Chargé d'affaires	István Dobi	Dwight D. Eisenhower	
February 14, 1962		János Radványi	Chargé d'affaires	István Dobi	John F. Kennedy	
November 28, 1966			Legation raised to embassy	István Dobi	Lyndon B. Johnson	
1967		Sándor Józan	Chargé d'affaires	Pál Losonczi	Lyndon B. Johnson	
September 27, 1968	October 10, 1968	János Nagy		Pál Losonczi	Lyndon B. Johnson	
June 9, 1971		Péter Fülöp (diplomat)	Chargé d'affaires	Pál Losonczi	Richard Nixon	
September 3, 1971	September 21, 1971	Károly Szabó (Ambassador to the United States)		Pál Losonczi	Richard Nixon	
April 28, 1975		Károly Kovács	Chargé d'affaires	Pál Losonczi	Gerald Ford	
June 6, 1975	July 14, 1975	Ferenc Esztergályos		Pál Losonczi	Gerald Ford	
September 28, 1981	October 26, 1981	János Petrán		Pál Losonczi	Ronald Reagan	
September 16, 1983	October 13, 1983	Vencel Házi		Pál Losonczi	Ronald Reagan	
October 18, 1991	November 25, 1991	Pál Tar		Árpád Göncz	George H. W. Bush	
October 1, 1989			Name changed to Republic of Hungary	Mátyás Szűrös	George H. W. Bush	
August 31, 1989	October 24, 1989	Péter Várkonyi		Mátyás Szűrös	George H. W. Bush	
September 10, 1990	October 24, 1990	Péter Zwack		Árpád Göncz	George H. W. Bush	
October 27, 1994	November 21, 1994	György Bánlaki		Árpád Göncz	Bill Clinton	
September 24, 1998	October 27, 1998	Géza Jeszenszky		Árpád Göncz	Bill Clinton	
September 10, 2002	September 25, 2002	András Simonyi		Ferenc Mádl	George W. Bush	
August 29, 2007	September 18, 2007	Ferenc Somogyi		László Sólyom	George W. Bush	
September 18, 2009	November 4, 2009	Béla Szombati		László Sólyom	Barack Obama	
January 31, 2011	February 23, 2011	György Szapáry		Pál Schmitt	Barack Obama	
February 18, 2015	February 23, 2015	Réka Szemerkényi		János Áder	Barack Obama	
	September 8, 2017	László Szabó		János Áder	Donald Trump	
		Szabolcs Takács				

== See also ==
- List of ambassadors of the United States to Hungary
