= Hungary–Mexico relations =

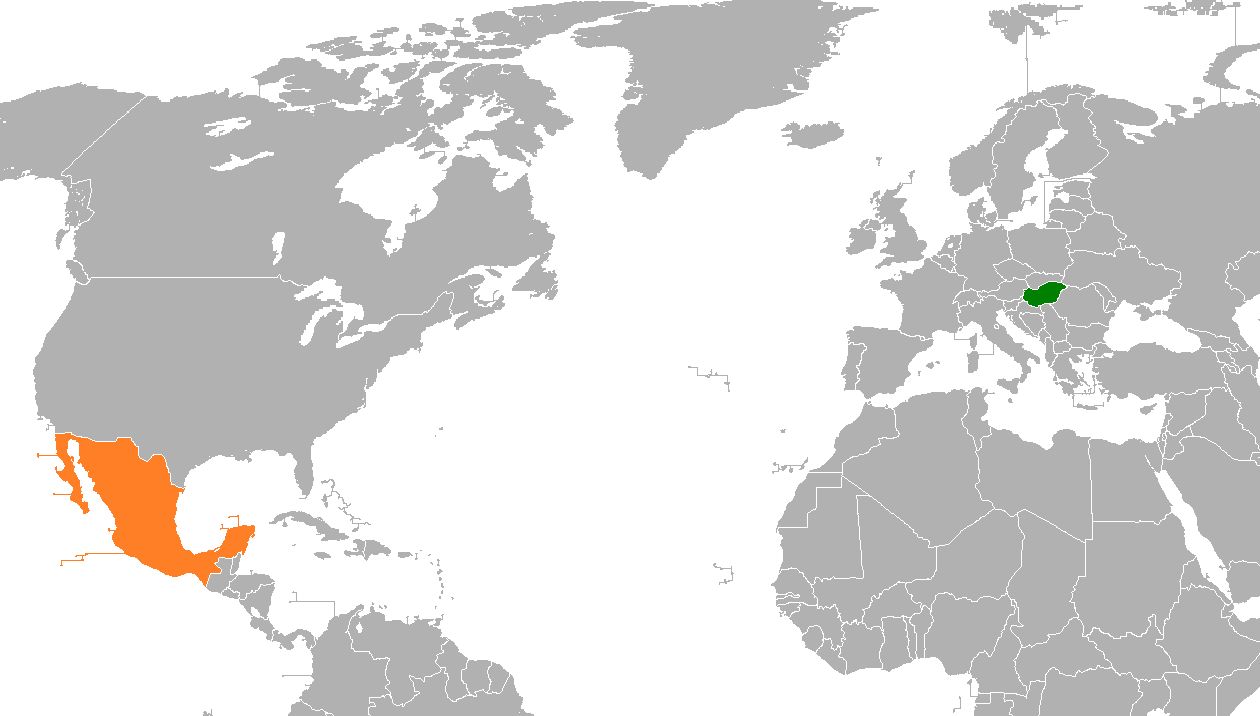

- Hungary: Mexico

Initial relations between Hungary and Mexico date back to the short reign of the Emperor Maximilian I of Mexico from 1864 to 1867. Diplomatic relations with the Austro-Hungarian Empire were established in 1901, and diplomatic relations continued between an independent Hungary and Mexico after the dissolution of the Austro-Hungarian Empire in 1918, however, diplomatic relations were once again suspended between 1941 and 1974. Diplomatic relations were re-established between both nations on 14 May 1974 and have continued unabated since.

Both nations are members of the Organisation for Economic Co-operation and Development and the United Nations.

== History ==
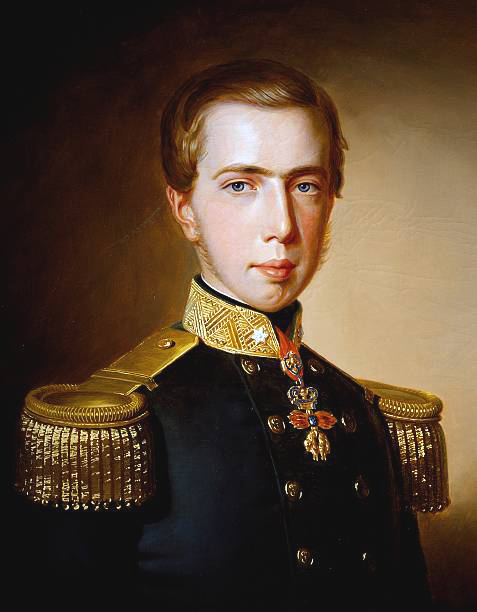
Portrait of Prince Ferdinand Maximilian of Austria, Prince of Hungary, Bohemia and Croatia and future Emperor of Mexico.

Hungarian Prime Minister Viktor Orbán and Mexican President Enrique Peña Nieto attending the Nuclear Security Summit in Washington, D.C.; 2016.

In 1861, French Emperor Napoleon III sought to expand his empire and invaded Mexico. The French Empire, along with Hungarian hussars, took control of the country. The first official contact between the Kingdom of Hungary and Mexico commenced with the arrival of Emperor Maximilian of Habsburg, who ruled Mexico from 1864 to 1867 and was brother to Franz Joseph I, Emperor of Austria and King of Hungary.

During the Siege of Mexico City, Hungarian soldiers fought to keep control of the city from Mexican Republican forces. In June 1867, Mexico City was taken by Republican forces and the remaining Hungarian soldiers were returned to Europe. In 1867, the Austro-Hungarian Empire broke diplomatic relations with Mexico after the assassination of Emperor Maximilian.

After World War I, the Austro-Hungarian Empire broke apart and Hungary became again an independent nation in 1918. In 1925, Mexico accredited its first diplomatic legation to Hungary based in Italy and named Carlos Puig y Casauranc as its first delegate to Hungary in 1927. The first Hungarian representative accredited to Mexico was Count László Széchenyi, head of the Hungarian legation based in Washington, D.C. In 1925 Count Széchenyi visited Mexico.

During World War II, Mexico severed diplomatic relations with Hungary in 1941. Diplomatic relations between both nations were re-established on 14 May 1974. In September 1976, Mexico opened an embassy in Budapest.

In 1977, Pál Losonczi, Head of the Presidential Council of the People's Republic of Hungary visited Mexico. In April 1990, Mexican Foreign Secretary Fernando Solana paid an official visit to Hungary. In October 1991 the State Secretary of the Hungarian Foreign Ministry, Ferenc Somogyi visited Mexico. The Hungarian Foreign Minister Géza Jeszenszky visited Mexico in March 1992. In July 1992, President Carlos Salinas de Gortari made the first state visit by a Mexican president to Hungary.

At the start of 1997, the Hungarian State Secretary of Foreign Affairs István Szent-Iványi visited Cuba and Mexico. In April 1997, Hungarian President Árpád Göncz paid a state visit to Mexico, the first since relations had been re-established, meeting Mexican President Ernesto Zedillo. In November 2001, Hungarian Prime Minister Viktor Orbán visited Mexico, where he attended a meeting of Leaders of Christian-Democratic Parties. In 2004, Mexican President Vicente Fox visited Hungary to discuss a future economic cooperation agreement that would boost economic and trade relations.

In January 2023, Hungarian Foreign Minister Péter Szijjártó paid a visit to Mexico and met with his counterpart Marcelo Ebrard. The two foreign minister discussed cooperation and trade and stated that both Mexico and the European Union required an upgraded cooperation agreement which was signed 20 years previously.

In 2024, both nations celebrated 50 years of diplomatic relations.

== High-level visits ==
High-level visits from Hungary to Mexico

- Chairman Pál Losonczi (1977)
- State Secretary Ferenc Somogyi (1991)
- Foreign Minister Géza Jeszenszky (1992)
- State Secretary István Szent-Iványi (1997)
- President Árpád Göncz (1997)
- Prime Minister Viktor Orbán (2001)
- Prime Minister Péter Medgyessy (2004)
- Foreign Minister Péter Szijjártó (2015, 2019, 2023)

High-level visits from Mexico to Hungary

- Foreign Secretary Fernando Solana (1990)
- President Carlos Salinas de Gortari (1992)
- Foreign Secretary Rosario Green (1998)
- President Vicente Fox (2004)
- Foreign Undersecretary Lourdes Aranda Bezaury (2005 & 2010)

== Bilateral agreements ==
Both nations have signed several bilateral agreements such as a Trade Agreement (1975); Agreements on the Abolition of Visas in Non-Ordinary and Ordinary Passports (1990); Agreement on Scientific and Technical Cooperation (1992); Agreement on Touristic Cooperation (1992); Agreement on Air Transportation (1997); Agreement on Investments (1997); Agreement on Economic Cooperation (2007); Agreement on Educational and Cultural Cooperation (1998); Avoid Double Taxation and Prevent Tax Evasion in the Matter of Income Taxes (2011); Agreement between the Hungarian National Trading House and ProMéxico (2015); and a Memorandum of Understanding on Academic-Diplomatic Cooperation between both nations diplomatic academies (2020).

== Trade ==
In 1997, Mexico signed a Free Trade Agreement with the European Union (which includes Hungary). In 2023, total trade between Hungary and Mexico totaled US$2.3 billion. Hungary's main exports to Mexico include: compression-ignition internal combustion piston engines; motor cars and other vehicles, parts and accessories for motor vehicles, instruments, appliances, and machines; articles of iron and steel, articles of plastic, medicines, and fiberglass. Mexico's main exports to Hungary include: parts and accessories for machines, data processing machines, telephones and mobile phones, parts and accessories for motor vehicles, articles of stone and minerals, nickel, chemical based products, hides, and alcohol.

Hungarian multinational companies Graphisoft and Gedeon Richter operate in Mexico. Mexican multinational company Nemak operates a production plant in the Hungarian city of Győr.

== Cultural and scientific links ==
The Hungarian Géza Maróti contributed the bronze sculpture group on top of the dome of the Palacio de Bellas Artes and other works inside this building, completed in 1934. Jorge Mester, a conductor and violinist was born in Mexico City to parents who had emigrated from Hungary. He has conducted many of the world's leading ensembles, including the Boston Symphony, the Detroit Symphony, and the Royal Philharmonic Orchestra. George Rosenkranz, born in Hungary in 1916, was a prominent scientist in steroid research who spent most of his life in Mexico.

Paprika, a key ingredient in Hungarian dishes such as goulash, originated in Mexico and was perhaps brought to Hungary by way of Turkey in the 17th century.

== Resident diplomatic missions ==
- Hungary has an embassy in Mexico City.
- Mexico has an embassy in Budapest.

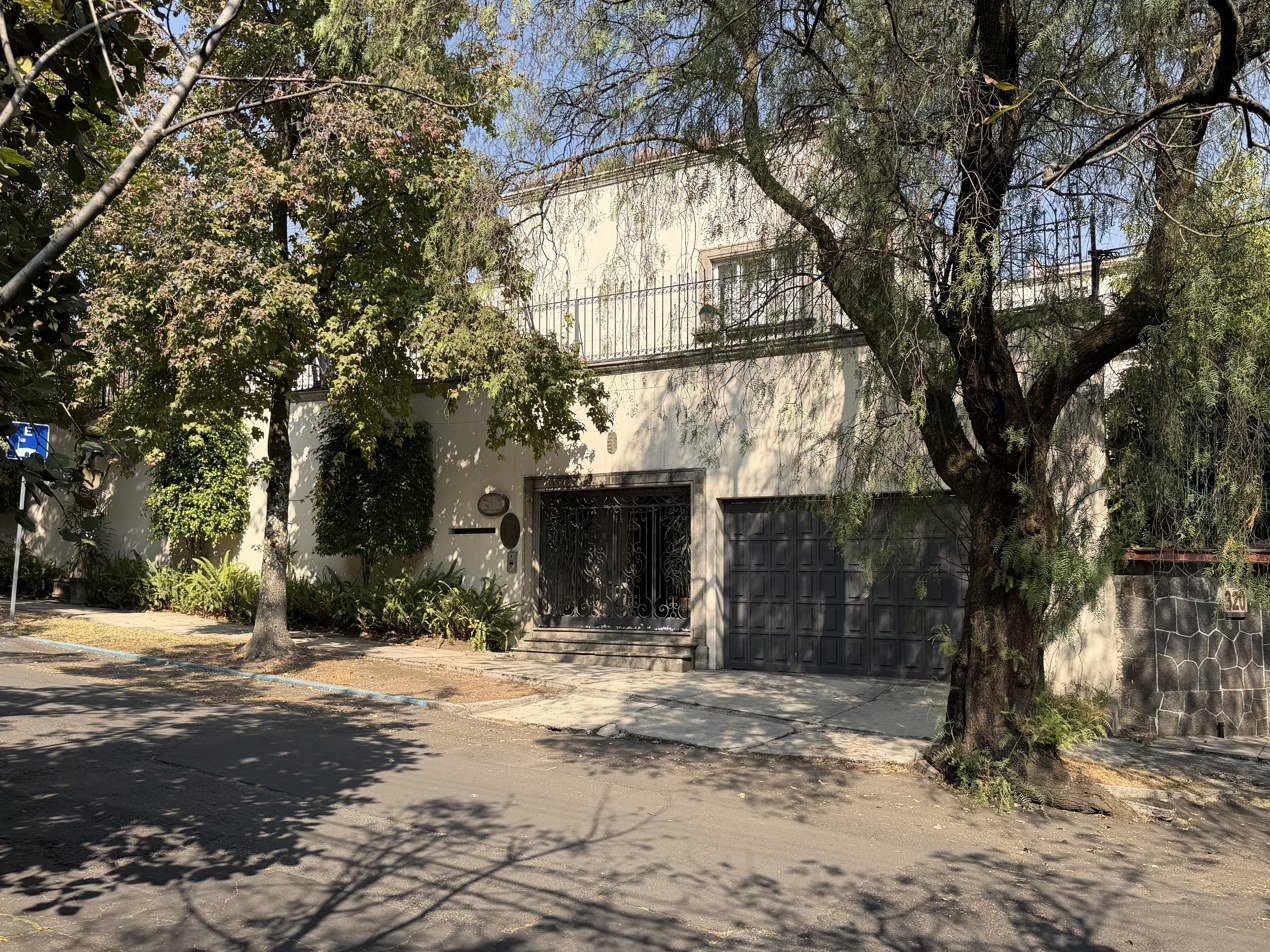
Embassy of Hungary in Mexico City

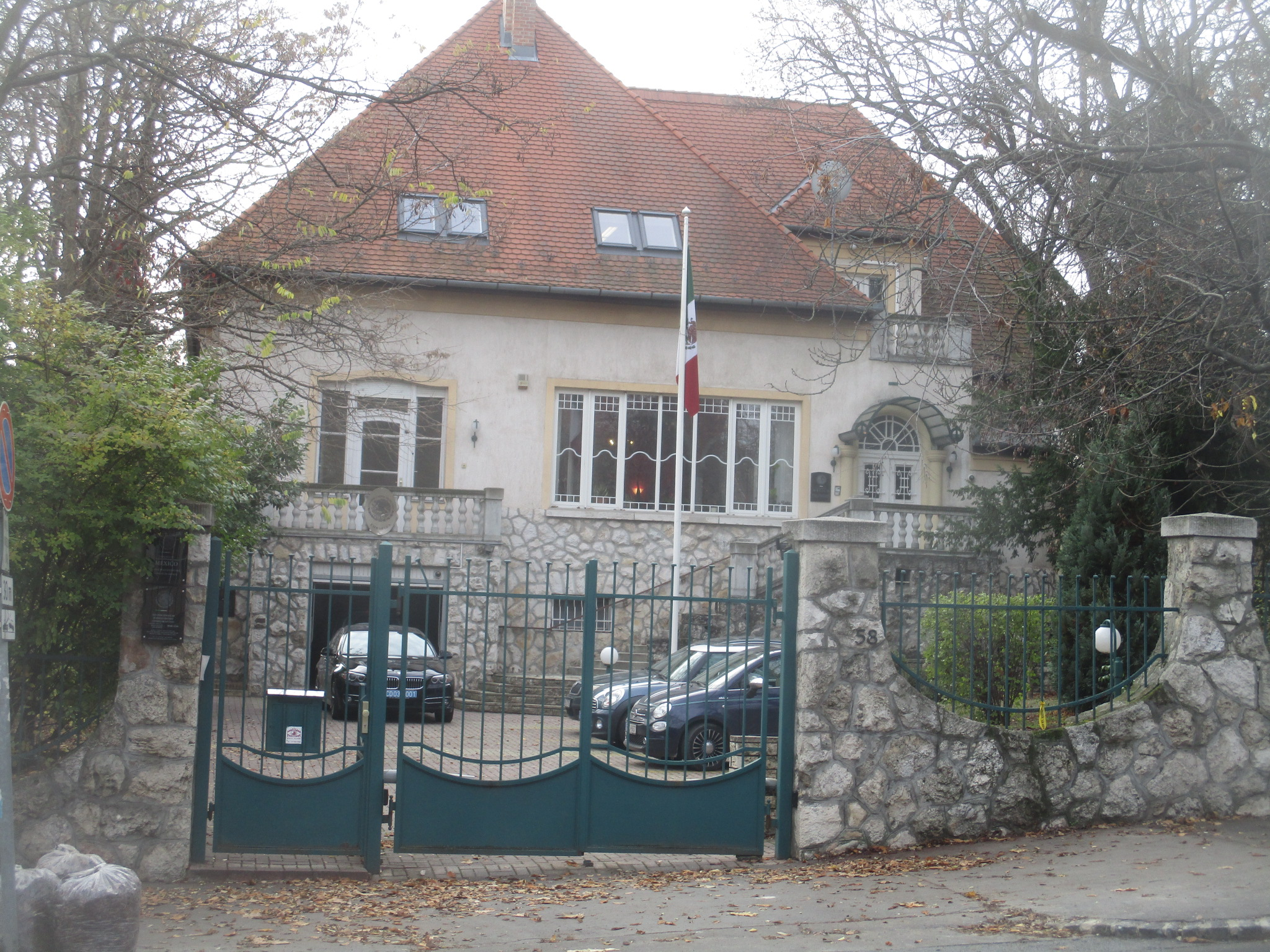
Embassy of Mexico in Budapest

== Gallery ==
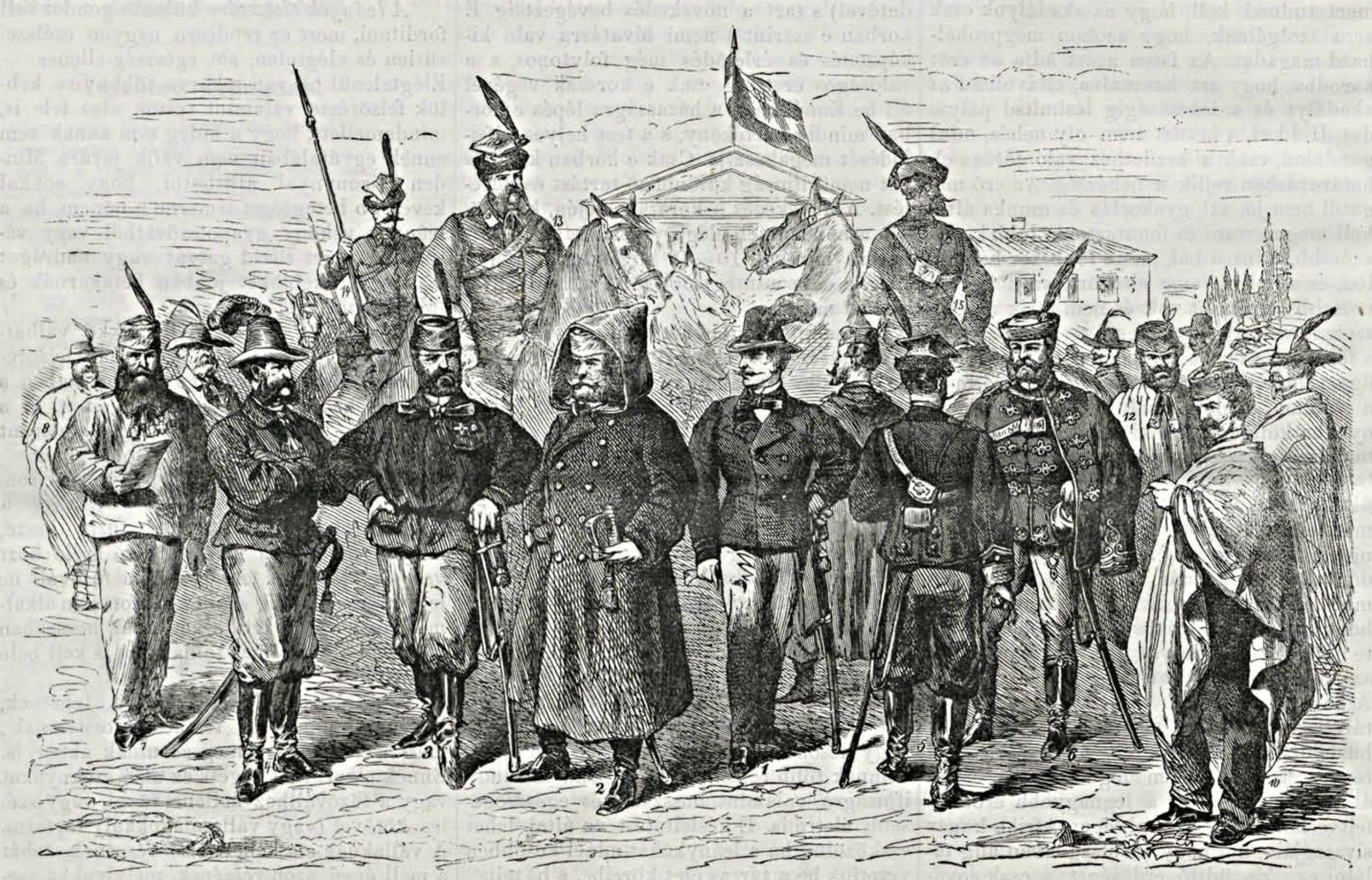
Hungarian hussars during the Second French intervention in Mexico

Residence of the Ambassador of Mexico in Budapest

== See also ==
- Hungarian Mexicans
