= László Szabó (diplomat) =

Hungarian diplomat, physician, businessman and politician (born 1965)

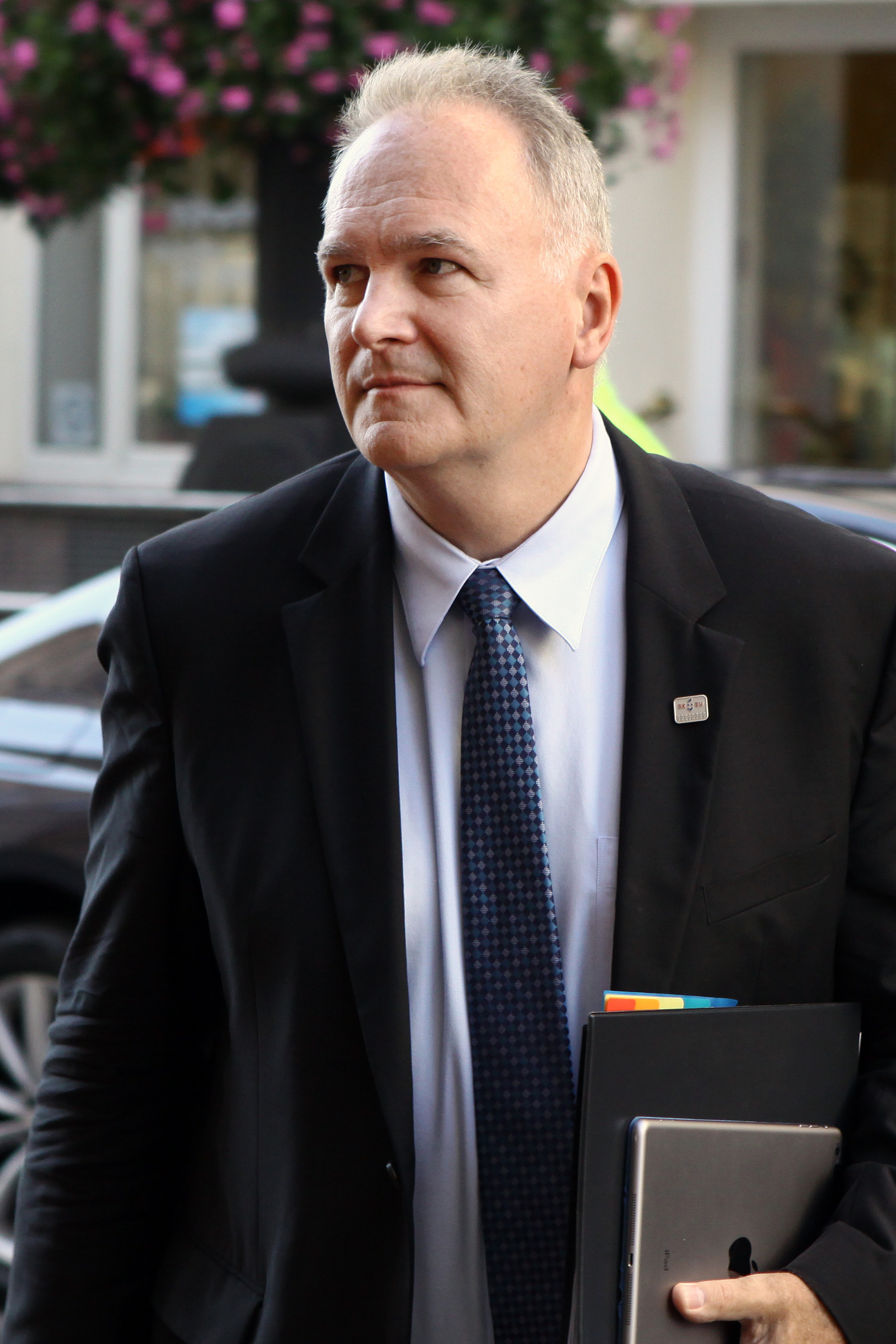
- László Szabó in 2016

Deputy Minister of Foreign Affairs and Trade State Secretary for Foreign Affairs
- In office 15 June 2014 – 26 July 2017
- Prime Minister: Viktor Orban

Hungarian Ambassador to the United States
- In office 28 July 2017 – 14 April 2020

Personal details
- Born: 1965 (age 60–61) Debrecen, Hungary
- Children: 3
- Occupation: CEO and Chairman of the Board of Directors of Mediaworks Hungary Company Ltd.

László Szabó (born 1965) is a Hungarian diplomat, physician, businessman and politician, who was Hungarian Ambassador to the United States between 2017 and 2020. Prior to that, he was CEO of the Teva Hungary Ltd. pharmaceutical manufacturing (2010–2014), then Deputy Minister of Foreign Affairs and Trade in the Third Orbán Government (2014–2017). He presented his credentials to U.S. President Donald Trump on 8 September 2017.

== Career ==
Szabó began his career in 1993 at Eli Lilly and Company. He started working as Medical Sales Representatives for one year. Then he was Marketing Coordinator and Product Manager for Hungary until 1997. In 1998 he worked in Wales UK as Sales Manager and became HR Associate and Team leader. Between 1999 and 2000 he was the Country Manager in New Zealand and the South-Pacific. In 2001 he was Director for Human Resources for Central and Eastern Europe, Africa and Middle East. Before he became Senior Director for Human Resources, Global Medical, Regulatory and Patient Safety in 2008, he worked as general manager for Hungary from 2003–2007.

After that Szabó left Eli Lilly and Company. From 2010–2014 he w as CEO of the Teva Hungary Ltd. pharmaceutical manufacturing. From June 2014 – 2017 Szabó was Deputy Minister of Foreign Affairs and since October 2014 Trade in the Third Orbán Government. In July 2017 he was appointed Ambassador of Hungary to the United States. Szabó hopes that the relationship between America and Hungary will improve under President Trump, thus Hungary can be more independent of Russia. With effect from 15 April 2020, the Board of Trustees of the Central European Press and Media Foundation (Kesma) has appointed László Szabó as the CEO and Chairman of the Board of Directors of Mediaworks Hungary Company Ltd.

Diplomatic posts
| Preceded by Réka Szemerkényi | Hungarian Ambassador to the United States; 2017-2020 | Succeeded by Szabolcs Takács |
