= Rustem Vambery =

Hungarian judge, politician and criminologist (1872–1948)

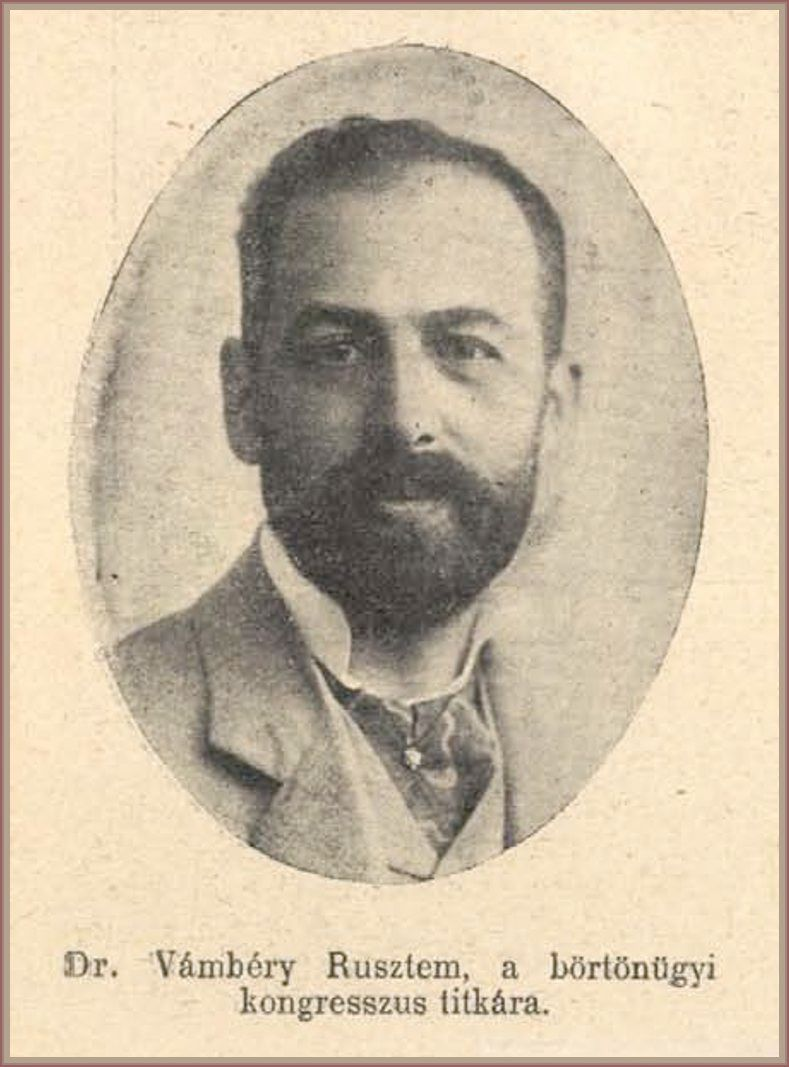
- Rusztem Vámbéry in 1905

Hungarian Ambassador to the United States
- In office 5 September 1947 – 2 May 1948
- President: Zoltán Tildy
- Preceded by: Paul Marik
- Succeeded by: Andrew Sik

Personal details
- Born: 29 February 1872 Pest, Hungary
- Died: 24 November 1948 (aged 76) New York City, United States

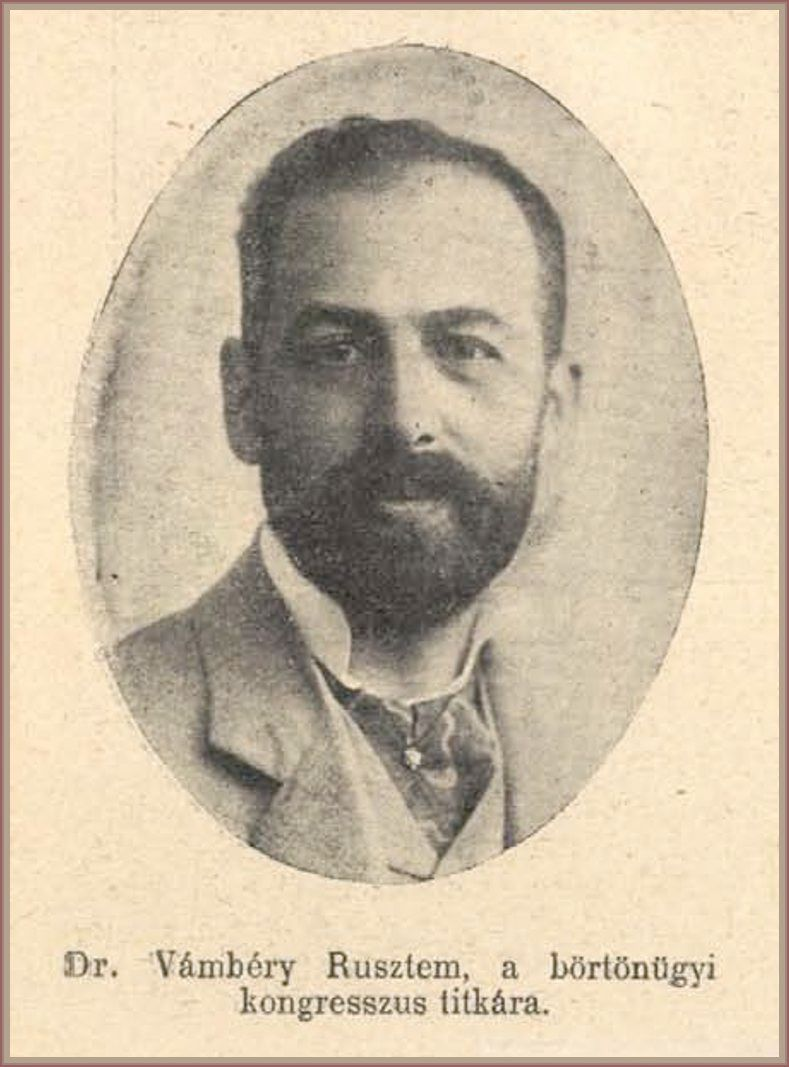
Rusztem Vámbéry (1905)

Rusztem Vámbéry (29 February 1872 in Budapest – 24 October 1948 in New York) was a judge, politician and criminologist of international standing.

He was the son of the famed orientalist Ármin Vámbéry. Edward Prince of Wales (later King Edward VII of the United Kingdom) was his godfather. He studied law in Halle and Budapest. In Hungary, he had opposed the policy of Béla Kun's Soviet Republic and Miklós Horthy's Regency. He lived in the U.S. from 1938, teaching at the New School for Social Research in New York. He was the Hungarian ambassador to the U.S. from 5 September 1947 to 2 May 1948.
