= Hungarian Mexicans =

Mexicans of Hungarian birth or descent

Hungarian Mexicans hungaro-mexicanos mexikói magyarok
Total population
- 369 Hungary-born residents (2020); Unknown number of Mexicans of Hungarian descent

Regions with significant populations
- Mexico City · Quintana Roo · State of Mexico · Jalisco · Querétaro

Languages
- Mexican Spanish · Hungarian

Religion
- Christianity

Related ethnic groups
- Hungarian diaspora

Hungarian Mexicans (Hungarian: mexikói magyarok [ˈmɛksikoːji ˈmɒɟɒrok]) are Mexicans of Hungarian ancestry or origin. According to the 2020 census of INEGI, there are 369 Hungarians residing in Mexico.

== History ==
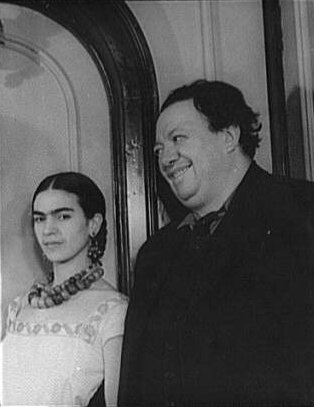
Frida Kahlo, Mexican painter of Hungarian ancestry with her husband, the muralist Diego Rivera

There is a record of some Hungarians immigrating to Mexico since the mid 19th century. Dr. Ede Szender, who arrived during the French Intervention lived for several years in San Luis Potosí, was in charge of the autopsy and embalming of the body of Maximilian of Habsburg and left a valuable face-to-face chronicle in the article “The death of the Emperor Maximilian”, which he published in 1876. At that time, other Hungarian immigrants also arrived as soldiers, but most of them returned to their homeland country at the end of their service.

In 1880, Vilmos Sennor, a Hungarian who lived in Mexico, published an article in the Budapest newspaper "Novedades Dominicales" (Vasárnapi Újság) about the arrival in Mexico of a group of gypsies, who were registered as Hungarians (Magyars ) for coming from Hungary. In 1931, as a consequence of the economic depression, the Mexican government imposed a restriction on the Migration Law of 1926 that temporarily prohibited the entry of Gypsies (and other nationalities), but not expressly that of Hungarians. Hungarian Jews arriving in Mexico followed the general trends of Ashkenazi Jewish emigration from Eastern Europe. The number of arrivals began to grow in the 1920s, attracted by the quota system introduced in the United States, but later decreased due to restrictions. Mónika Szente-Varga has carried out in-depth research on the Hungarian migration to Mexico between 1901 and 1950.

== Cultural associations ==
In the INEGI report "Foreigners in Mexico" (2003), Hungarians are not included in the list of immigrant colonies, which constitute at least 0.2% of all foreign-born residents, nor does it specify their population. However, this estimate does not consider residents of Hungarian origin with a passport from Mexico or another country, that is, the entire Hungarian colony. Most of the people of Hungarian descent have settled in Mexico City. and neighboring cities, but they are also in various states. In recent years, several Hungarians have settled in the Riviera Maya and dedicate themselves to the most diverse activities. Every year the Hungarian community in Cancún organizes a Hungarian Cultural Festival.

Mexicans of Hungarian or Judeo-Hungarian descent have excelled in various fields of art. Géza Maróti, a Hungarian architect contributed with the finishing of the dome, sculptures and mosaics in the construction of the Palace of Fine Arts in 1908. Other Mexicans of Hungarian descent have now reached important places in the world of communications (M. Hegyi, J. Erdely), public administration (Miguel Székely) and science (Prize National Science, 2009). In recent years, academic studies have been carried out on Hungarian immigration to Mexico by Margarita Theesz Poschner, from the UNAM

== Notable people ==
=== Hungarians living in Mexico ===
- Kati Horna, photographer
- Árpád Fekete, footballer and coach

=== Mexicans of Hungarian descent ===
- Gunther Gerzso, plastic artist
- Ona Grauer, actress
- Luis Mandoki, film director
- David Alfaro Siqueiros, artist
- José Sacal, artist

== See also ==
- Immigration to Mexico
- Hungary-Mexico relations
- Hungarian diaspora
