= György Ghika =

Hungarian diplomat (1882–1966)

- dezsánfalvi Ghika György

Hungarian Minister to the United States
- In office 18 March 1941 – 11 December 1941
- Preceded by: János Pelényi; István Rothkugel (chargé d'affaires)
- Succeeded by: Diplomatic relations severed Aladár Szegedy-Maszák (in 1945)

Hungarian Minister to Cuba and Mexico
- In office 1 February 1941 – 11 December 1941

Hungarian Minister to Japan
- In office 16 September 1939 (Presented credentials 12 December 1939) – March 1941
- Preceded by: Position established
- Succeeded by: László Velics

Royal Hungarian Consul General in New York
- In office 17 February 1927 – September 1939

Personal details
- Born: April 1, 1882 Dézsánfalva, Temes County, Kingdom of Hungary
- Died: June 1966 (aged 84) Washington, D.C., United States
- Children: 1 (Annelise Hedwig)
- Alma mater: Diplomatic Academy of Vienna
- Occupation: Diplomat

György Ghika de Dezsánfalva (also known as George de Ghika, sometimes Prince George de Ghika, 1 April 1882 – June 1966) was a Hungarian diplomat who served in the foreign services of Austria-Hungary and the Kingdom of Hungary. During his career, he served as Consul General in New York City, Hungary's first Envoy Extraordinary and Minister Plenipotentiary to Japan, and subsequently Envoy Extraordinary and Minister Plenipotentiary to the United States, Cuba, and Mexico in 1941 until the suspension of diplomatic relations during World War II. In late 1943, he served as a secret emissary in Bern to explore armistice negotiations with the Western Allies.

== Early life and family ==
Coat of arms of the Hungarian branch of the Ghica family, granted in 1817

György Ghika was born on 1 April 1882 in the village of Dézsánfalva in Temes County, Kingdom of Hungary (present-day Dejan, Timiș County, Romania). He hailed from the princely Ghica family and was of Eastern Orthodox faith.

== Consular career ==
=== Austro-Hungarian foreign service (1906–1918) ===
Ghika joined the Austro-Hungarian diplomatic and consular service on 9 July 1906. On 3 December 1906, he was appointed consular attaché in Belgrade, the capital of the Kingdom of Serbia. On 22 July 1908, he was transferred alongside the consulate to Niš. He was promoted to the rank of vice-consul on 1 December 1908.

On 23 September 1910, Ghika commenced his consular posting in Milan, Kingdom of Italy. On 13 June 1912, he was reassigned to the Austro-Hungarian consulate in Hamburg, German Empire, where he served throughout the duration of World War I.

=== Consular service in Hamburg and New York (1919–1939) ===
Following the dissolution of Austria-Hungary, Ghika entered the foreign service of the newly independent Hungary. He remained stationed in Hamburg, serving as an appointed Consul First Class from January 1919 to 1 August 1922. From 1 August 1922 until 27 June 1926, he continued in Hamburg as Consul First Class invested with the personal title of Consul General Second Class. During his service in Germany, he authored and delivered a published lecture examining political developments in post-war Hungary.

On 17 February 1927, Ghika was entrusted with the leadership of the Royal Hungarian Consulate General in New York City. He headed the mission as Consul General Second Class between 1927 and 1934, and was subsequently elevated to Consul General First Class in 1934, a role he maintained until his diplomatic posting to East Asia in late 1939.

== Diplomatic mission in World War II ==
=== Envoy to Japan (1939–1941) ===
On 16 September 1939, following the outbreak of World War II, Ghika was appointed Envoy Extraordinary and Minister Plenipotentiary to head Hungary's newly established legation in Tokyo, Japan. Upon arriving in Tokyo, he officially presented his credentials and commenced his duties on 12 December 1939.

During his tenure in Tokyo, Hungary formally acceded to the Tripartite Pact alongside Germany, Italy, and Japan on 20 November 1940. In recognition of his diplomatic service in East Asia, he was decorated with the Order of the Sacred Treasure (First Class) by the Emperor of Japan, as well as the Order of the Pillar of State (Chu Kuo, First Class) on 3 May 1941.

=== Envoy to the United States, Cuba, and Mexico (1941) ===
Following the resignation of Hungarian Minister János Pelényi in late 1940, legation counselor István Rothkugel served as interim chargé d'affaires in Washington, D.C. Ghika was appointed to succeed Pelényi, simultaneously receiving credentials on 1 February 1941 as Envoy Extraordinary and Minister Plenipotentiary to Cuba and Mexico.

Ghika formally took charge of the Hungarian Legation in Washington, D.C. on 18 March 1941. On 4 April 1941, he was received by President Franklin D. Roosevelt in a private audience at the White House. Upon presenting his letters of credence, Ghika formally informed President Roosevelt of the suicide of Hungarian Prime Minister Count Pál Teleki, which had occurred the previous day following the German ultimatum to invade Yugoslavia through Hungarian territory.

Ghika led the Washington legation until 11 December 1941, when Prime Minister László Bárdossy declared the existence of a state of war between Hungary and the United States, leading to the termination of diplomatic relations. Ghika was recalled by the Hungarian government and returned to Budapest via diplomatic exchange alongside his daughter.

The following is an excerpt from Galeazzo Ciano's diaries:

Hungarian uneasiness is expressed by this little story making the rounds in Budapest. The Minister of Hungary (i. e. Ghika) declares war on the United States, but the official who receives the communication is not very well informed on European matters and hence asks several questions.
He asks. ″Is Hungary a republic?′ ″No, it is a kingdom.′ ″Then you have a king?′ ″No, we have an admiral.″ ″Then you have a fleet?′ ″No, we do not have any sea.″ ″Do you have any claims then?′ ″Yes.″ ″Against America?′ ″No.″ ″Against England?′ ″No.″ ″Against Russia?′ ″No.″ ″But against whom do you have these claims?′ ″Against Romania.″ ″Then you will declare war on Romania?′ ″No sir. We are allies.″
There is a great deal of truth in this series of paradoxes.

— May 11, 1942

=== Secret armistice mission in Bern (1943) ===
After retiring from active diplomatic service, Ghika was awarded the Grand Cross of the Hungarian Order of Merit on 27 February 1943 by Regent Miklós Horthy.

In late 1943, as the military situation deteriorated for the Axis powers, circles around Regent Horthy sought backchannel negotiations to exit the war. On 18 December 1943, Ghika acted as an intermediary in Bern, Switzerland, delivering a confidential communication from Miklós Horthy Jr. regarding Hungary's potential armistice and capitulation to the Western Allies. In Bern, Ghika verbally conveyed to Allied representatives that the Hungarian leadership was awaiting an operational signal from the Western Allies before acting.

== Post-war life and emigration ==
In 1946, following the end of the war and the establishment of Soviet influence in Hungary, Ghika emigrated with his daughter from Ascona, Switzerland, traveling through Sweden to settle permanently in the United States.

Holding strong sympathies for the Western Allies, Ghika actively supported the humanitarian and philanthropic efforts of the American Hungarian Relief (Hungarian: Amerikai Magyar Segélyakció). During his retirement years in the United States, he pursued intellectual and scientific interests, becoming a member of several prominent civic and scientific organizations in New York, including the American Museum of Natural History, the National Audubon Society, and the Entomological Society.

Ghika died in June 1966 in Washington, D.C., at the age of 84.

== Personal life ==
Ghika had one daughter, Annelise Hedwig Ghika (born 1914), who accompanied him during his diplomatic postings and later in his post-war emigration to the United States.

== Honours ==
- (Hungary) Grand Cross of the Hungarian Order of Merit (27 February 1943)
- (Japan) Order of the Sacred Treasure, First Class
- (Manchukuo) Order of the Pillar of State, First Class (3 May 1941)

== Publications ==
- Ghika, György (1920). Vortrag des königlich ungarischen Konsuls Ghika ... über die politische Entwicklung in Ungarn (in German). Hamburg: Druck Brügge.
- Ghika, György (1935). How John Hunyadi Fought the Turks. New York: New York Times.
