= Zwack =

Hungarian liqueur and spirit company

Zwack Unicum Nyrt.
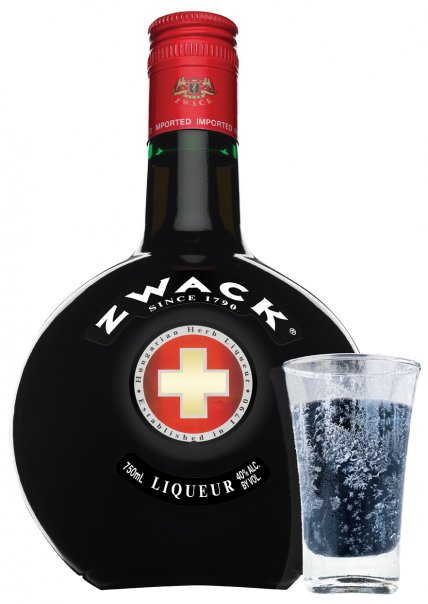
- Type: Public
- Traded as: BPSE: ZWACK; BUX Component
- Industry: Food, Beverage & Tobacco
- Founded: 1840
- Headquarters: Budapest, Hungary
- Area served: 30 countries around the world
- Key people: Sándor Zwack, Isabella Veronika Zwack
- Website: zwackunicum.hu/en/

Zwack Unicum liqueur
- Type: Digestif
- Manufacturer: Unicum Zwack plc
- Distributor: PMA Canada
- Origin: Budapest, Hungary
- Introduced: 1790
- Alcohol by volume: 40%
- Proof (US): 80
- Website: zwackunicum.hu

Zwack is a Budapest, Hungary-based company that makes liqueurs and spirits. The company produces an 80 U.S. proof (40% alcohol) herbal liqueur known as Unicum from a secret blend of more than forty different herbs and spices. Unicum is known as one of the national drinks of Hungary.

The company is also a distributor of a range of international brands such as Johnnie Walker, Baileys, Smirnoff, Hennessy and Gordons. Zwack has been listed on the Budapest Stock Exchange since 1993.

== History ==
According to legend, Unicum was created by a dr. Zwack, the Royal Physician to the Habsburg Court, for Emperor Joseph II in 1790. In 1840 (or 1847 according to other sources) József Zwack founded J. Zwack & Co., the first Hungarian liqueur manufacturer. By the early 1900s, the Zwack company had become one of the largest distilleries in central Europe, producing and exporting over 200 liqueurs and spirits.

During World War II, the Zwack factory was damaged and production stopped. After the war the factory was nationalized in 1948 by the communist Hungarian Working People's Party. The Zwack family fled the country. János Zwack with his son Péter Zwack, great-grandson of József, was able to escape with the original Zwack recipe. Béla Zwack remained behind to give the communist government a fake Zwack recipe and went on to become a regular factory worker. Meanwhile, János and Péter migrated to the United States, eventually settling in the Bronx in 1949 when Péter was 22 years old.

In 1988, just one year before the fall of Communism in Europe, Péter Zwack returned to Hungary and resumed production with the original Zwack formula. He repurchased his family business from the State in the summer of 1989, and by the spring of 1990, the original Zwack product was reintroduced to the Hungarian market. That same year, Péter was named Hungarian Ambassador to the United States.

In 2008, Péter Zwack handed over the company's leadership to the family's 6th generation, his own children, Sándor and Izabella Zwack. One of their first initiatives was to launch Zwack in the US. In 2013, the Zwack Company also launched Unicum and Unicum Plum in the US.

== Details ==
Unicum is made from a blend of more than 40 different herbs and spices. Some of the herbs and spices are distilled, some are macerated, then blended together and aged in oak casks at the factory in Budapest for over 6 months. The dark amber hue is achieved with added caramel colour.

This bitter herbal liqueur is mainly consumed as an apéritif before meals or a digestif after meals. The company also produces a different version of the liqueur known as Unicum next, which is made from basically the same recipe but is slightly less bitter and has more of a citrus finish on the palate.

== Other Zwack products ==
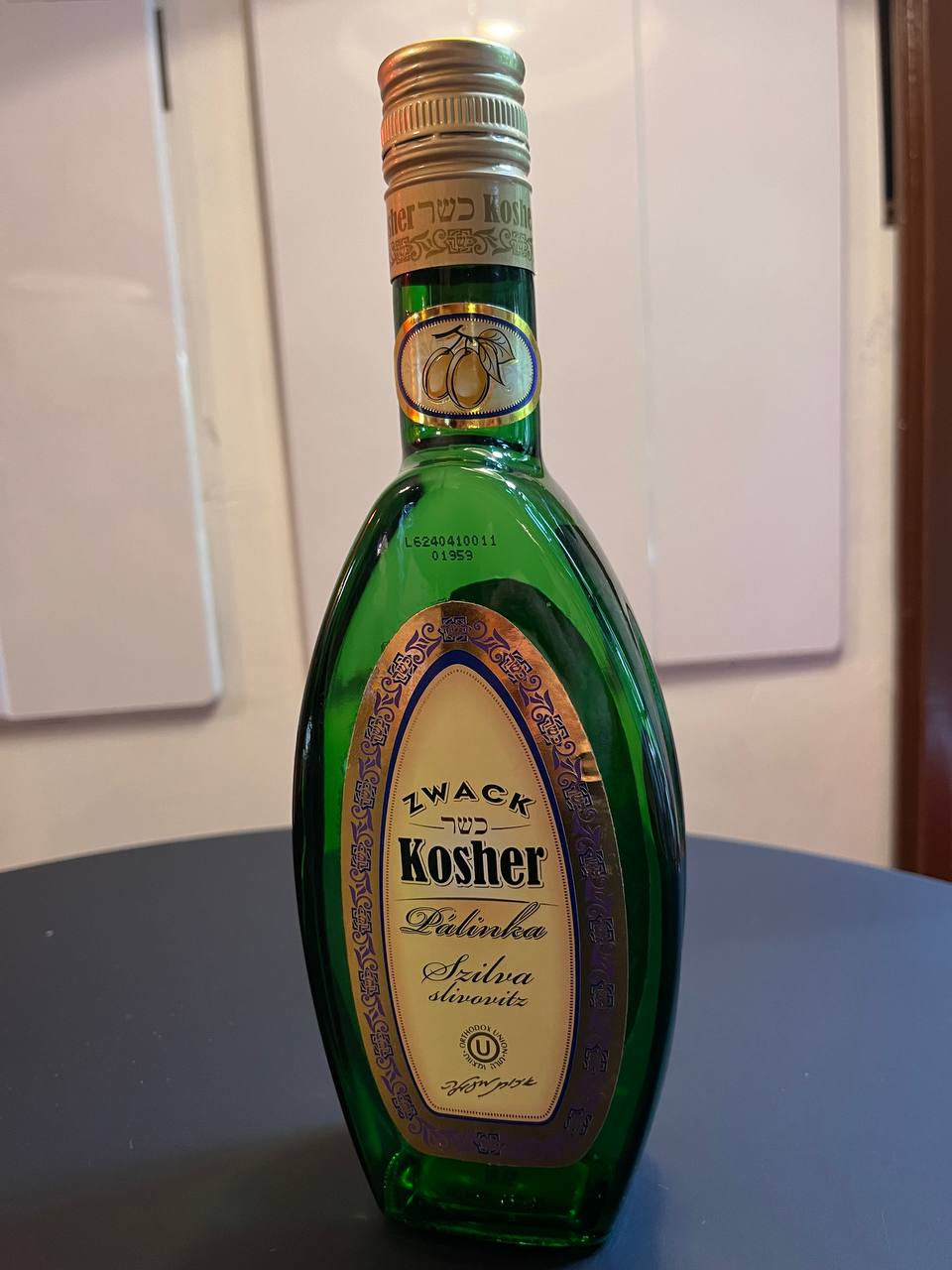
Zwack Kosher

=== Vilmos product family ===
Vilmos is a product range of spirit drinks made by mixing pear pálinka, neutral spirits and added flavourings with or without the addition of honey. There's also a genuine pear pálinka in the range, aged 3 years.

=== St. Hubertus product family ===
St. Hubertus is a traditional, herbal liqueur, St. Hubertus 33 gets its name from the 33 different herbs used to make this drink and because it is 33% alcohol. St. Hubertus 33 is marketed more towards younger people, because of its lighter flavour.

=== Hírös Kecskeméti product family ===
This product family consists of real palinkas and some spirits that although are made 100% from distilled fruit, they are sweetened with honey, thus they cannot be sold under the label of pálinka, so they are marketed under the Hírös Kecskeméti label. These are a lighter, sweeter, pálinka-based liqueur.

=== Kalinka product family ===
Contains one vodka and two vodka-based alcoholic beverages. Kalinka Samovar is a 30% drink flavoured with honey and tea. Carbonated Kalinka, or "Fény" is a flavoured, 21% drink with carbon dioxide added.

=== Fütyülős ===
This product family was based on Fütyülős Barack, a spirit drink made by mixing apricot pálinka, neutral spirits and flavourings. The range initially has been broadened with six different fruit liqueurs produced alike, but mellowed with sugar and honey. Finally, it was completed with six different kinds of pure pálinka. Fütyülős Barack is not to be confused with its 20th century predecessor, Fütyülős Barackpálinka, which was an authentic apricot pálinka, aged in wooden barrels. Modern Fütyülős Barack was described by a professional Hungarian jury as having "a taste and flavour of petroleum; cannot be recommended to anyone [...]"

=== Zwack Sándor Nemes Pálinka Family ===
The noble pálinka family consisting of genuine fruit pálinkas.
