= Ármin Vámbéry =

Hungarian Turkologist and traveller (1831–1913)

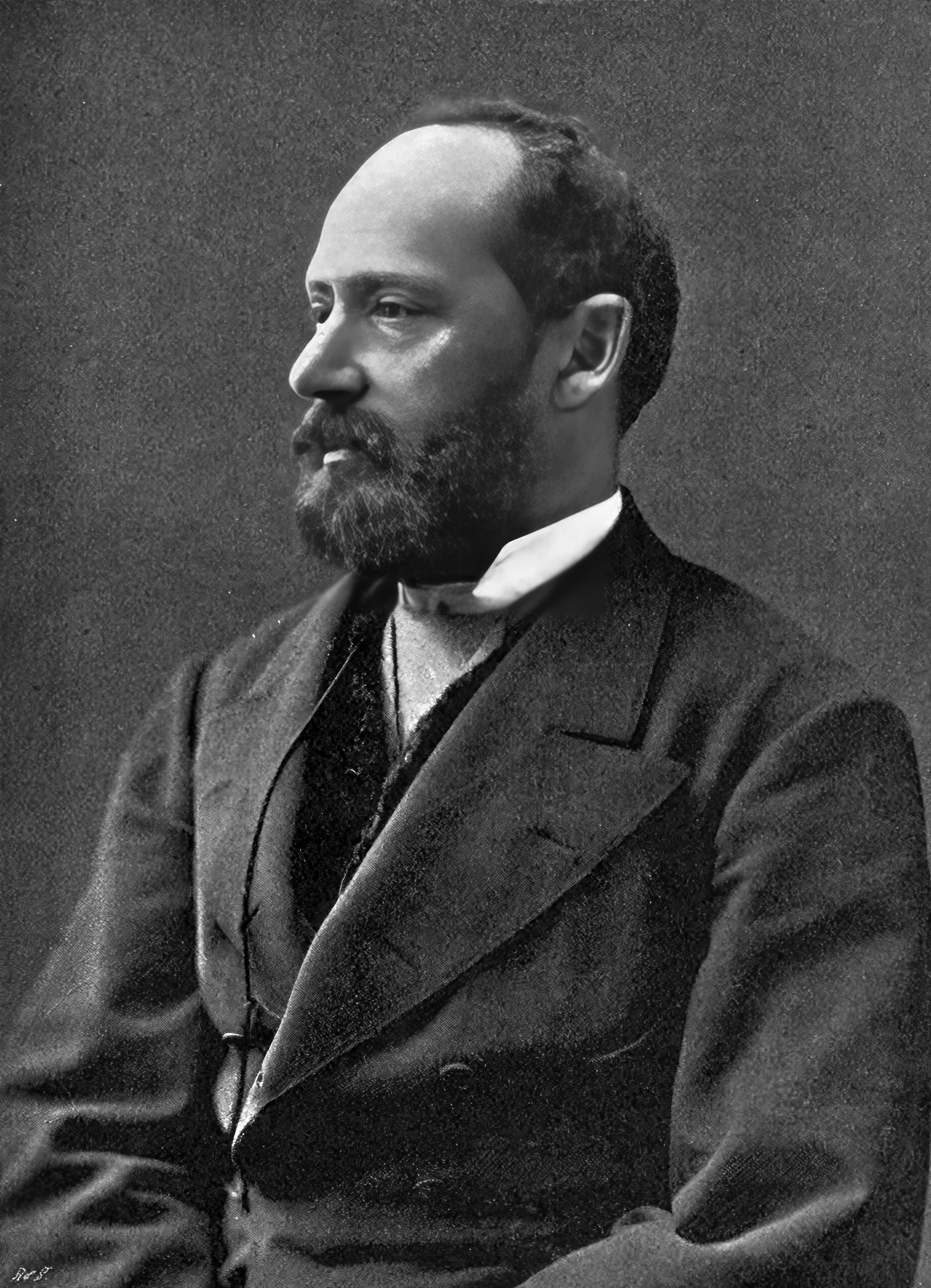
- Vámbéry c. 1895
- Born: 19 March 1832; Szentgyörgy / Sankt Georgen, Pozsony County, Kingdom of Hungary, Austrian Empire (now Svätý Jur)
- Died: 15 September 1913 (aged 81); Budapest, Austria-Hungary
- Occupations: Turkologist, orientalist, traveller

Ármin Vámbéry (born Hermann Wamberger; 19 March 1832 – 15 September 1913), also known as Arminius Vámbéry, was a Hungarian Turkologist and traveller.

== Early life ==
Vámbéry was born in 1832 in the Hungarian city of Szentgyörgy within the Austrian Empire (now Svätý Jur in Slovakia), into a poor Jewish family. According to Ernst Pawel, a biographer of Theodor Herzl, as well as Tom Reiss, a biographer of Lev Nussimbaum, Vámbéry's original last name was Wamberger rather than Bamberger. He was raised Jewish, but later became an atheist. Vámbéry was 1 year old when his father died and the family moved to Dunaszerdahely (now Dunajská Streda in Slovakia).

In his autobiography, Vámbéry says that his parents were so poor and had so many children that they were forced to stop supporting each child at a young age. He was set "adrift" at the age of 12. Vámbéry says that the constant hunger and scanty clothing of his childhood hardened his young body, which served him well in his later travels. He walked with a crutch under his left arm because of a congenital disorder.

He attended the local school until the age of 12 and showed a remarkable aptitude for learning languages. He was forced to leave school, to support himself with work. He worked briefly as a dressmaker's assistant, but after becoming tutor to the son of the village innkeeper, he was enabled by his friends to enter the Untergymnasium of Szentgyörgy (Svätý Jur).

By the age of 16, he had a good knowledge of Hungarian, Hebrew, Latin, French, and German. He was also rapidly acquiring English, the Scandinavian languages, Russian, Serbian, and other Slavic languages.

In 1846, he went to Pozsony (now Bratislava), where he remained for three years. Later he studied in Vienna, Kecskemét, and Budapest.

== Diplomatic work ==
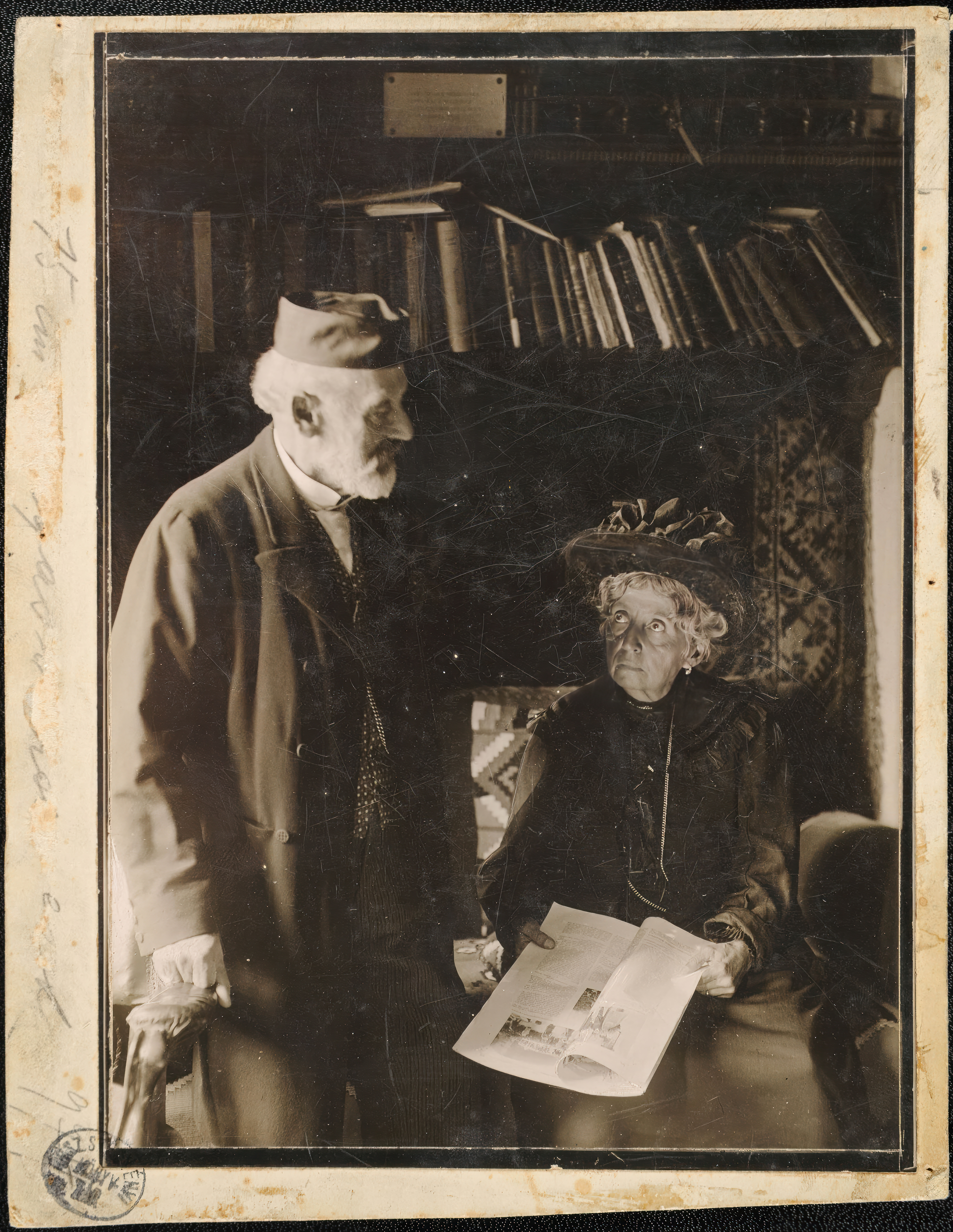
Vámbéry and his wife.

Theodor Herzl enlisted Vámbéry to consult on diplomatic work in the Ottoman Empire (despite Herzl's reputation for working alone). Vámbéry was a professor of Oriental languages at the University of Budapest. Herzl said of Vámbéry:

[He] doesn't know whether he is more Turk than Englishman, writes books in German, speaks twelve languages with equal mastery and has professed five religions, in two of which he has served as a priest...He told me 1001 tales of the Orient, of his intimacy with the sultan, etc. He immediately trusted me completely and told me, under oath of secrecy, that he was a secret agent of Turkey and of England.

== Travels ==
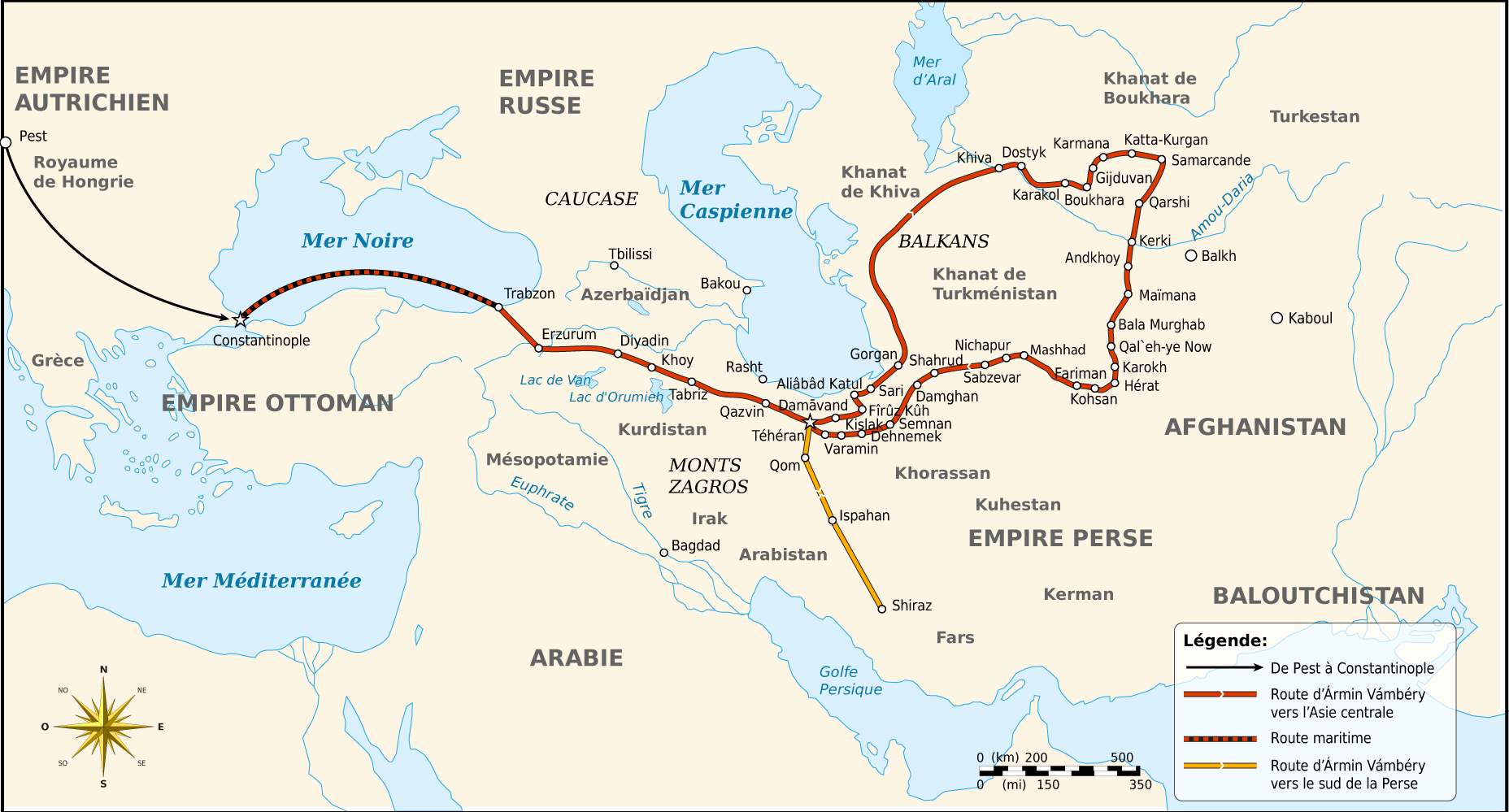
Map of the travel of Ármin Vámbery in Central Asia

Vámbéry was especially attracted by the literature and culture of the Ottoman Empire including Turkey. By the age of twenty, Vámbéry had learned enough Ottoman Turkish to enable him to go, through the assistance of Baron József Eötvös, to Istanbul and establish himself as a private tutor of European languages. He became a tutor in the house of Huseyin Daim Pasha, and, under the influence of his friend and instructor, Ahmet Efendi, became a full Osmanli, serving as secretary to Fuat Pasha. About this time he was elected a corresponding member of the Hungarian Academy of Sciences in recognition of his translations of Ottoman historians.

After spending about a year in the Payitaht, he published a German–Turkish dictionary in 1858. Later, he also published various other linguistic works. He also learned some 20 other Turkish languages and dialects. Returning to Budapest in 1861, he received a stipend of a thousand florins from the academy, and in the autumn of the same year, disguised as a Sunni dervish, and under the name of "Reshit Efendi", he set out from the capital city of the Ottoman Empire.

His route went from Trebizond on the Black Sea to Tehran in Persia, where he joined a band of pilgrims returning from Mecca, spending several months with them traveling across Central Iran (Tabriz, Zanjan, and Kazvin). He then went to Shiraz, through Isfahan, and in June 1863 he reached Khorezm (Central Asia). Throughout this time, he succeeded in maintaining his disguise as "Reshit Efendi", so that upon his arrival at the Khanate of Khiva he managed to keep up appearances during interviews with Khan Sayyid Muhammad. Together with his band of travelers, he then crossed Bokhara and arrived at Samarkand. He described the main monuments of Samarkand including the citadel of the city. Initially, he aroused the suspicions of the local ruler, who kept him in an audience for a full half-hour. Vámbéry managed to maintain his pretences, and left the audience laden with gifts. Upon leaving Samarkand, Vámbéry began making his way back to Istanbul, traveling by way of Herat. There he took leave of the band of dervishes and joined a caravan to Tehran, and from there, via Trebizond and Erzurum, to Istanbul, arriving there in March 1864.

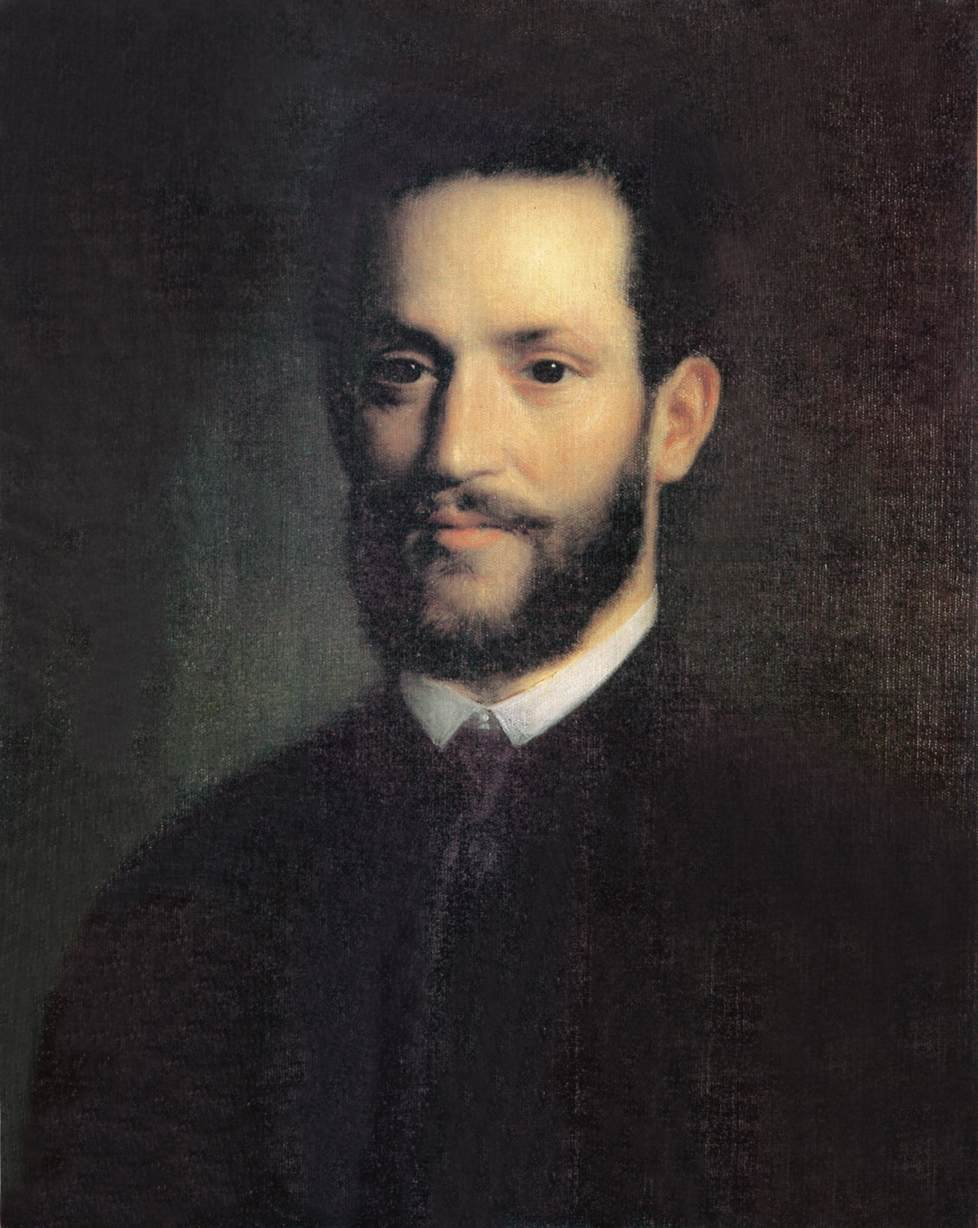
Portrait of Arminius Vámbéry, by Mihály Kovács, 1861

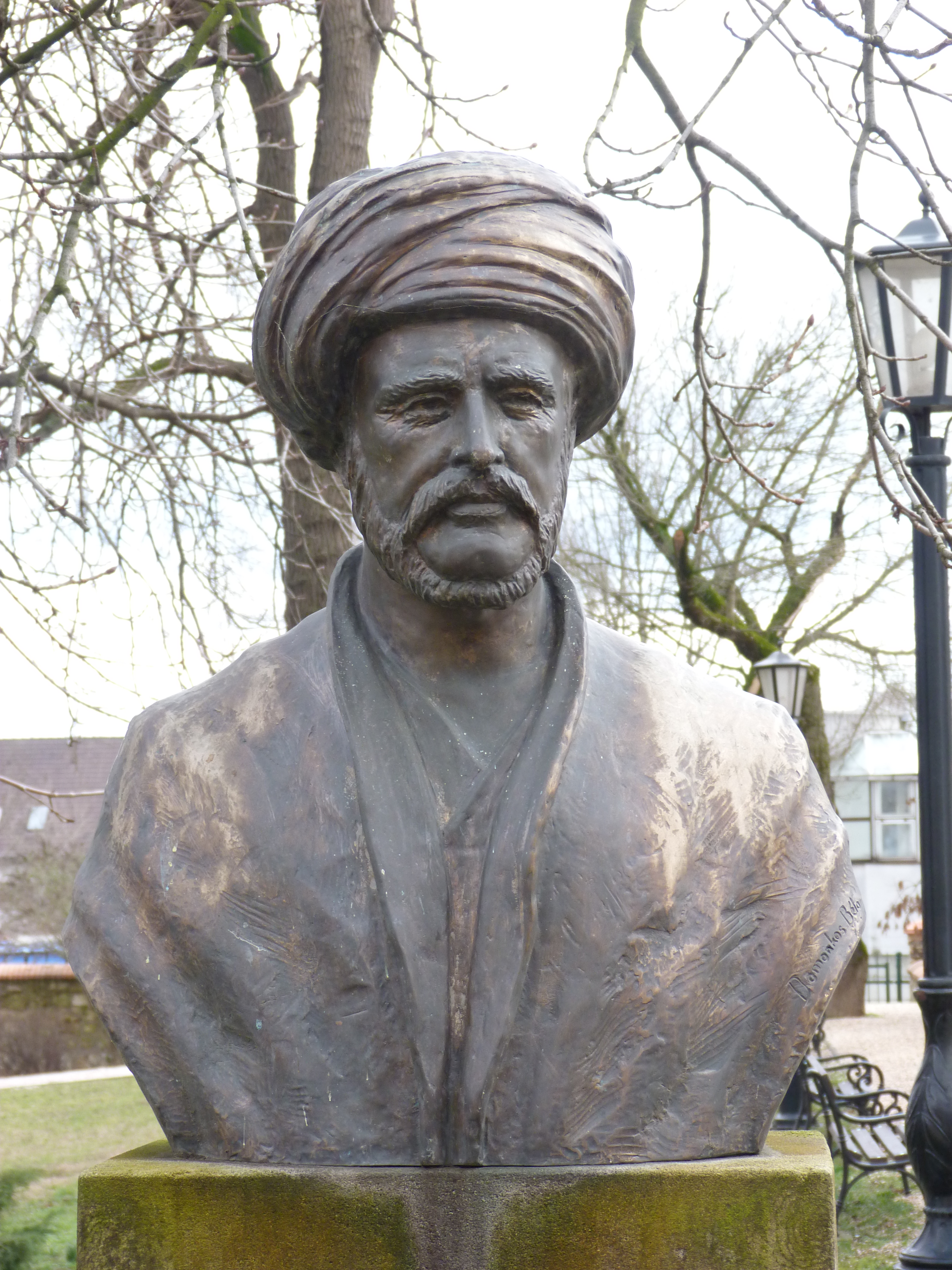
Ármin Vámbéry

This was the first successful journey of its kind undertaken by a European; and since it was necessary to avoid suspicion, Vámbéry could not take even fragmentary notes, except by stealth. After a long and perilous journey he arrived back at Pest in May 1864. He went to London to arrange the English-language publication of his book about the travels. Travels in Central Asia and its Hungarian counterpart Közép-ázsiai utazás were published in 1865. Thanks to his travels Vámbéry became an internationally renowned writer and celebrity. He became acquainted with members of British social elite. The Ambassador of Austria in London gave him a letter of recommendation to the Emperor, who received him in an audience and rewarded Vámbéry's international success by granting him professorship in the Royal University of Pest.

Vámbéry became known also as a publicist, zealously defending British policy in the East as against that of the Russians. He was widely celebrated at his 70th birthday in March 1902, receiving greetings from academic institutions all over Europe. The British king Edward VII appointed him an Honorary Commander of the Royal Victorian Order, his house order, followed by a letter where Vámbéry was appreciated as "so good and constant a friend to England". In 2005 the National Archives at Kew made files accessible to the public, and it was revealed that Vámbéry had been employed by the British Foreign Office as an agent and spy whose task it was to combat Russian attempts at gaining ground in Central Asia and threatening the British position on the Indian sub-continent.

He advocated the theory of close Turkic-Hungarian linguistic and ethnic relationship, and his publications on the subject provoked a harsh scientific and public debate in Hungary, remembered as the "Ugric-Turk War". Vámbéry argued that the large number of similarities between Turkic languages and Hungarian pointed to a shared origin of these languages and peoples in Northern Asia. His strongest evidences were the large corpus of ancient Turkish words in Hungarian word-stock (300–400 for a minimum, and even more with good alternative Turkic etymologies), and the strong typological similarity of Hungarian and Turkic languages. In his opinion Hungarian is a contact language, more precisely a mixed language, and a fruit of the intermingling of early Hungarians with Turkic peoples; as a result of this merger, the Hungarian language got a unique, distinctly dual (Ugric and Turkic) character. (The intriguing problem of Turkic-Hungarian language relations is far from settled even after centuries of research.) Vámbéry was not the first to suggest such mixed origin; the German linguist and Orientalist Wilhelm Schott (Orientalist) (1802–1889) was a proponent of Finn-Turk-Hungarian kinship, and considered the Hungarians (and their language) a mixture of Turkic and Hyperborean, for example Saamic or Samoyedic, elements. Nonetheless, Vámbéry's theory was opposed by proponents of the Finno-Ugric theory of the origins of Hungarian, who gradually triumphed in Hungary but not in Turkey. In Turkey, Hungarian and Turkish are still considered as two branches of the same language family, the Ural-Altaic.

Vámbéry was acquainted with Bram Stoker, during a stay in London, and Stoker claimed him as his consultant, and as relayer of Balkan folklore inspirator of main antagonist character Dracula and, of course, the book's title. The character of Professor Van Helsing in Stoker's novel, Dracula, is sometimes said to be based on Vámbéry, though Stoker was likely inspired by Sheridan Le Fanu's Dr Hesselius. In the novel (chapters 18 and 23) Van Helsing refers to his "friend Arminius, of Buda-Pesth University".

His son, Rustem Vambery, briefly served as Hungary's ambassador to the United States after World War II.

== Publications ==
- "Deutsch-Türkisches Taschenwörterbuch" (Constantinople, 1858) [German-Turkish Pocket Dictionary]
- "Abuska," a Turkish-Chagatai dictionary (Budapest, 1861)
- "Reise in Mittelasien" (Leipzig, 1865, 2d ed. 1873) [Travel in Middle Asia]
- "Cagataische Sprachstudien" (ib. 1867) [Chagatai Language Studies] (Ćagataische sprachstudien, enthaltend grammatikalischen umriss, chrestomathie, und wörterbuch der ćagataischen sprache;)
- "Meine Wanderungen und Erlebnisse in Persien" (ib. 1867) - Wanderings and Adventures in Persia [My Wanderings and Experiences in Persia]
- "Skizzen aus Mittelasien" (ib. 1868) - Sketches of Central Asia
- "Uigurische Sprachmonumente und das Kudatku-Bilik" (Innsbruck, 1870)
- "Uigurisch-Türkische Wortvergleichungen" (Budapest, 1870)
- "Geschichte Bocharas" (2 vols., Stuttgart, 1872) - History of Bokhara (1873)
- "Der Islam im Neunzehnten Jahrhundert" (Leipzig, 1875) [Islam in the Nineteenth Century]
- "Sittenbilder aus dem Morgenlande" (Berlin, 1876) - Manners in Oriental Countries
- "Etymologisches Wörterbuch der Turkotatarischen Sprachen" (Leipzig, 1878) [Etymological Dictionary of the Turko-Tatar Languages]
- "Die Primitive Cultur des Turkotatarischen Volkes" (ib. 1879) - Primitive Civilization of the Turko-Tatar People
- "Der Ursprung der Magyaren" (ib. 1882) - Origin of the Magyars
- "Das Türkenvolk" (ib. 1885)- The Turkish People
- "Die Scheïbaniade, ein Oezbegisches Heldengedicht", text and translation (Budapest, 1885)
- "Story of Hungary" (London, 1887)
- "A Magyarság Keletkezése és Gyarapodása" (Budapest, 1895)
- "Travels and Adventures of the Turkish Admiral Sidi Ali Reis in India, Afghanistan, Central Asia, and Persia During the Years 1553-1556", a translation from the Turkish (ib. 1899)
- "Alt-Osmanische Sprachstudien" (Leyden, 1901) [Old-Ottoman (Turkish) Language Studies]
- 'Western Culture in Eastern Lands; A Comparison of the Methods Adopted by England and Russia in the Middle East. (1906)

On political subjects, Vámbéry wrote:

- "Russlands Machtstellung in Asien" (Leipzig, 1871) [Russia's Power Position in Asia]
- "Zentralasien und die Englisch-Russische Grenzfrage" (ib. 1873) [Central Asia and the English-Russian Border Question]
- "The Coming Struggle for India" (London, 1885)

He wrote his autobiography under the titles "Arminius Vámbéry, His Life and Adventures" (ib. 1883) and "Struggles of My Life" (ib. 1904).

Many of his works have been translated into other languages, especially French. He also published numerous articles and books, mostly in German and Hungarian. His travels have been translated into many languages, and his Autobiography was written in English. "Meine Wanderungen und Erlebnisse in Persien" has been translated into Persian, by the Iranian film director Khosrow Sinai.

== Sources ==
- Herzl, King of the Jews: A Psychoanalytic Biography of Theodor Herzl, by Avner Falk (1993), pp. 395ff. has a detailed discussion of Vámbéry's biography and of his relations with Herzl.
