= Béla Szombati =

Hungarian diplomat (born 1955)

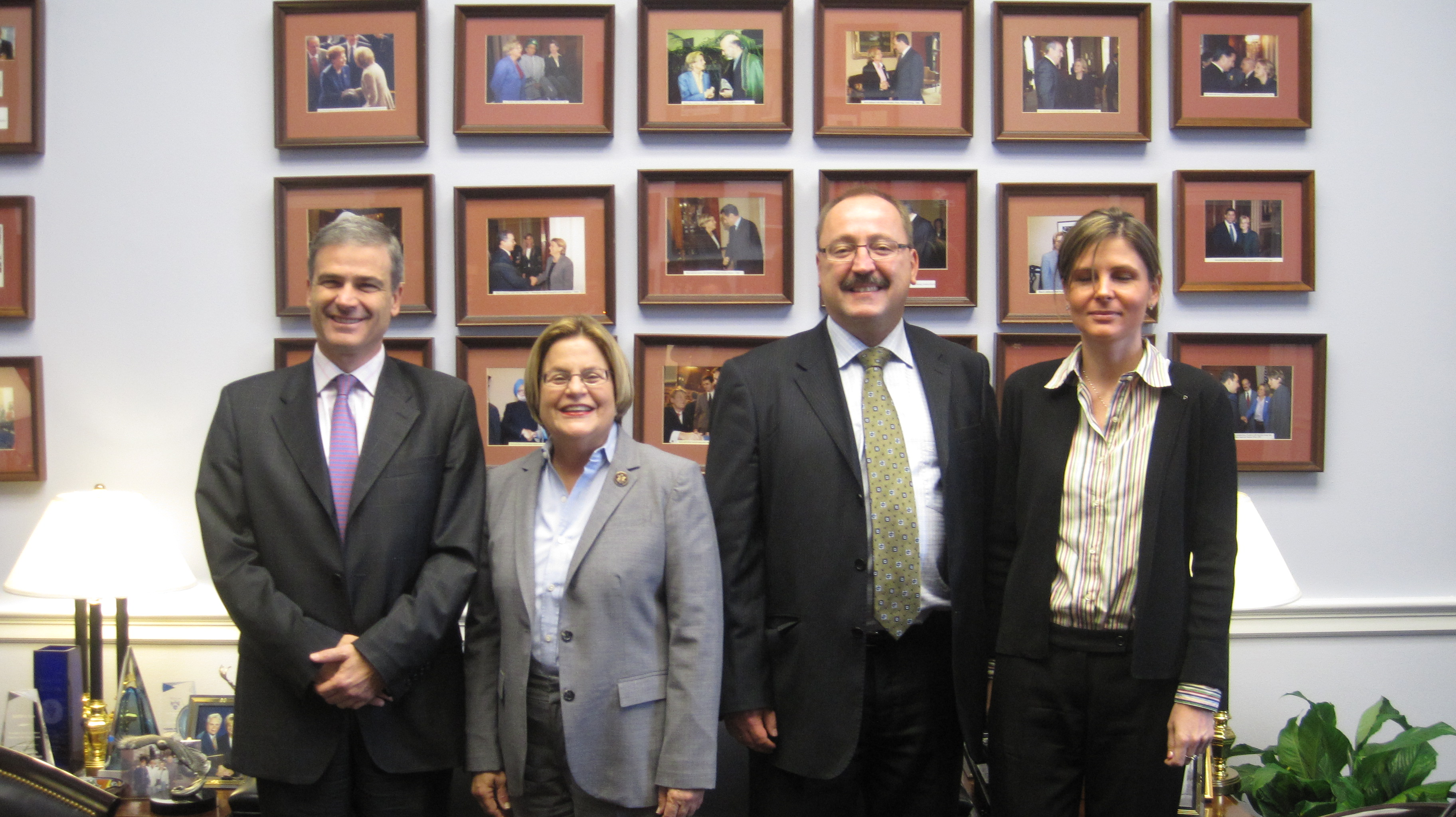
- Szombati (left) with Ileana Ros-Lehtinen and Zsolt Németh in 2009

Hungarian Ambassador to the United States
- In office 2009 – January 2011
- Preceded by: Ferenc Somogyi
- Succeeded by: György Szapáry

Personal details
- Born: 1955 (age 70–71)
- Profession: diplomat

Béla Szombati (born 1955) is a former Hungarian Ambassador to the United States.

== Career ==
He served as head of the Strategic Planning and Information Management Department at the Ministry of Foreign Affairs (2006–09) as well as Hungary's ambassador to the United Kingdom (2002–06) and to France (1994–99). In addition, he was deputy head of the State Secretariat for European Integration (1999-2002) and foreign policy advisor to the Hungarian president and head of the Foreign Relations Department of the President's Office in Budapest (1991–94).

Szombati — who previously served in Washington from 1988 to 1991 as cultural attaché at the Hungarian Embassy — has also held posts at the Hungarian Embassy in Vietnam as well as in the Foreign Ministry's Departments for North America, Asia, Western Europe and International Security.

He was appointed ambassador to the United States in 2009 following Ferenc Somogyi in this position. After the 2010 Hungarian parliamentary election he was replaced by György Szapáry, a Hungarian businessman.

He also worked for the Delegation of the European Union to Turkey in the years 2012–2016.

== Education ==
He completed his higher education at London University and Eötvös Loránd University in Budapest, where he graduated in 1980, after which he joined the Ministry of Foreign Affairs.

He speaks fluent English and French as well as some Russian and Spanish.

== Private life ==
Szombati is married to Zsuzsa Mihályi and has two sons, Kristóf (born 1980) and Dániel (born 1986).

Diplomatic posts
Preceded by Gábor Szentiványi	Hungarian Ambassador to the United Kingdom; 2002–2006	Succeeded by Borbála Czakó
Preceded by Ferenc Somogyi	Hungarian Ambassador to the United States; 2009–2011	Succeeded by György Szapáry
