= György Szapáry =

Hungarian economist (born 1938)

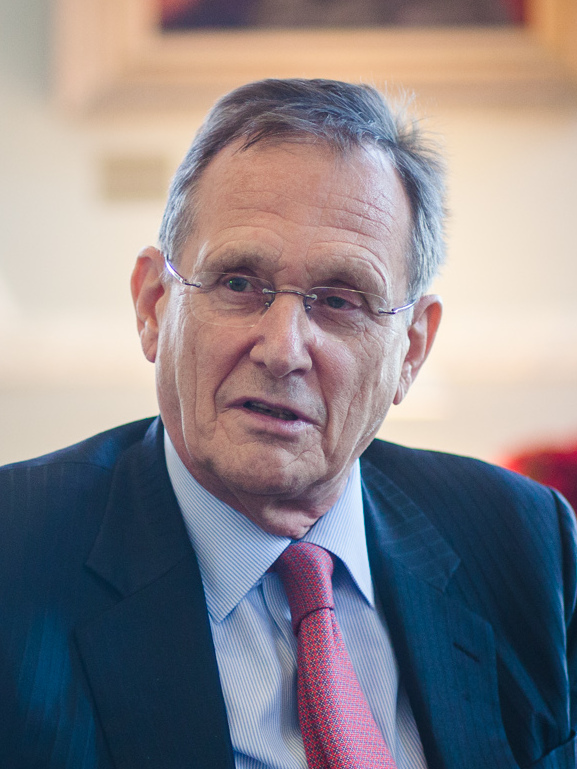
- Szapáry in 2012

Hungarian Ambassador to the United States
- In office January 2011 – January 2015
- Preceded by: Béla Szombati
- Succeeded by: Réka Szemerkényi

Personal details
- Born: 1 August 1938 (age 88) Tiszabura, Hungary
- Party: independent
- Spouse: Daniéle Héléne Lucienne Winckelmans
- Children: Philippe; Christophe
- Profession: diplomat, economist

György Szapáry (born 1 August 1938) is a Hungarian–Belgian economist, who served as the Hungarian Ambassador to the United States between 2011 and 2015. He was also a former Deputy Governor of the Hungarian National Bank.

== Early life ==
He was born as Count György Béla Mária József István Szapáry de Szapár, Muraszombat et Széchy-Sziget (Hungarian: szapári, muraszombati és széchy-szigeti gróf Szapáry György Béla Mária József István) into a prominent aristocrat Szapáry family in Tiszabura. His parents were Count Gyula Szapáry de Szapár, Muraszombat et Széchy-Sziget (1901-1985) and Countess Adél Maria Amalia Hadik de Futak (1909-1972). One of his great-grandfathers was Count Gyula Szapáry, the Prime Minister of Hungary between 1890 and 1892. After the Hungarian Revolution of 1956 he emigrated to Austria then Belgium. He holds a master's degree and a doctorate in economics from the Catholic University of Leuven. His academic opponent was Sándor Lámfalussy.

== Career ==
Between 1965 and 1966, he worked for the European Economic Community (EEC). Between December 1966 and April 1990, he worked at the International Monetary Fund in Washington, D.C., most recently as assistant director. Returning home and granting Hungarian citizenship in 1990, Szapáry was senior resident representative of the International Monetary Fund in Hungary (1990–1993). Then he served as deputy governor of the Hungarian National Bank and thus a member of the Monetary Council on two occasions (1993–1999 then 2001–2007), under governors Péter Ákos Bod, György Surányi and Zsigmond Járai, as well as senior advisor to György Surányi, the Governor of the Hungarian National Bank (1999–2001).

Other positions include alternate governor for the European Bank for Reconstruction and Development (1994–1995); president of the Board of Directors for the International Training Centre for Bankers in Budapest (1993–2001); board member of the Budapest Commodity Exchange (1997–2001); president of the Foundation for Enterprise Promotion for the Hungarian province of Jász-Nagykun-Szolnok (1995–99); member of the Economic and Financial Committee of the European Commission and of the European Central Bank’s International Relations Committee (2004–07); and member of the Hungarian Economic Social Council (2004–07). He was also a member of the Supervisory Board and Audit Committee of Telekom Hungary (2007) and a member of the Board of Directors of the OTP Bank, Budapest, Hungary (May 2008-January 2011). He has been a member of the Euro50 Group since 2001.

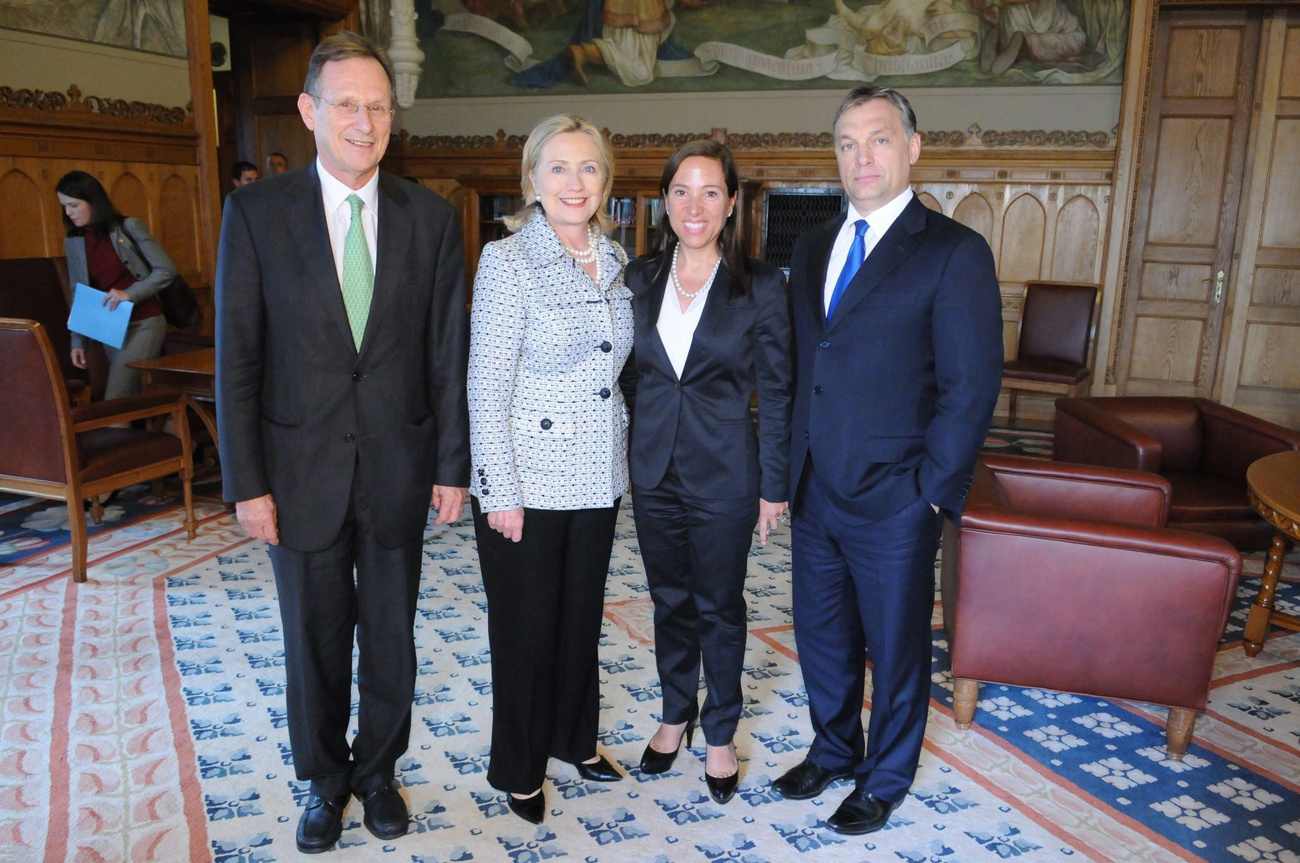
Szapáry in 2011 with U.S. Secretary of State Hillary Clinton, U.S. Ambassador to Hungary Eleni Kounalakis, and Hungarian Prime Minister Viktor Orbán

From July 2010 to January 2011, Szapáry was chief economic policy advisor to Prime Minister Viktor Orbán. He was appointed Hungarian Ambassador to the United States of America in early 2011. He replaced Béla Szombati in this position. Due to his appointment, the Second Orbán Government changed the law on the appointment of ambassadors by abolishing the age limit of 70 years. Szapáry was 72-year-old when Prime Minister Viktor Orbán invited him to fill the position. As a result, critics called the law as "lex Szapáry". He served in that capacity until January 2015, when he was replaced by Réka Szemerkényi. Currently he is Chief Adviser to the Governor of the Hungarian National Bank and honorary professor at Corvinus University of Budapest.

Szapáry is Doctor honoris causa of the University of Miskolc, Hungary; the recipient of the Sándor Popovics Award in recognition for outstanding contribution in the field of banking and monetary policy; a recipient of the OTP Bank's András Fay award; and a recipient of the insignia of the French Chevalier de la Légion d'Honneur.

== Personal life ==
Szapáry married biologist Daniéle Héléne Lucienne Winckelmans (born 1939 in Belgian Congo) in Hoboken, Antwerp on 21 August 1965. Daniéle Szapáry died in May 2011. They have two sons and five grandchildren. The elder son Philippe Olivier (born 1967) obtained an MD degree from the University of Chicago and works at a pharmaceutical company in Philadelphia. The younger son Christophe Béla (born 1969) is a lawyer in New Orleans.

== Selected publications ==
- Diffusion du progrès et convergence des prix, Europe-États-Unis, 1899–1962 (co-editor, 1966)
- Moderate inflation. The Experience of Transition Economies (co-editor. 1998)
- Monetary Strategies for Joining the Euro (2004)

== Notes ==
Diplomatic posts
Preceded by Béla Szombati	Hungarian Ambassador to the United States; 2011–2015	Succeeded by Réka Szemerkényi
