= András Simonyi =

Hungarian diplomat (b. 1952)

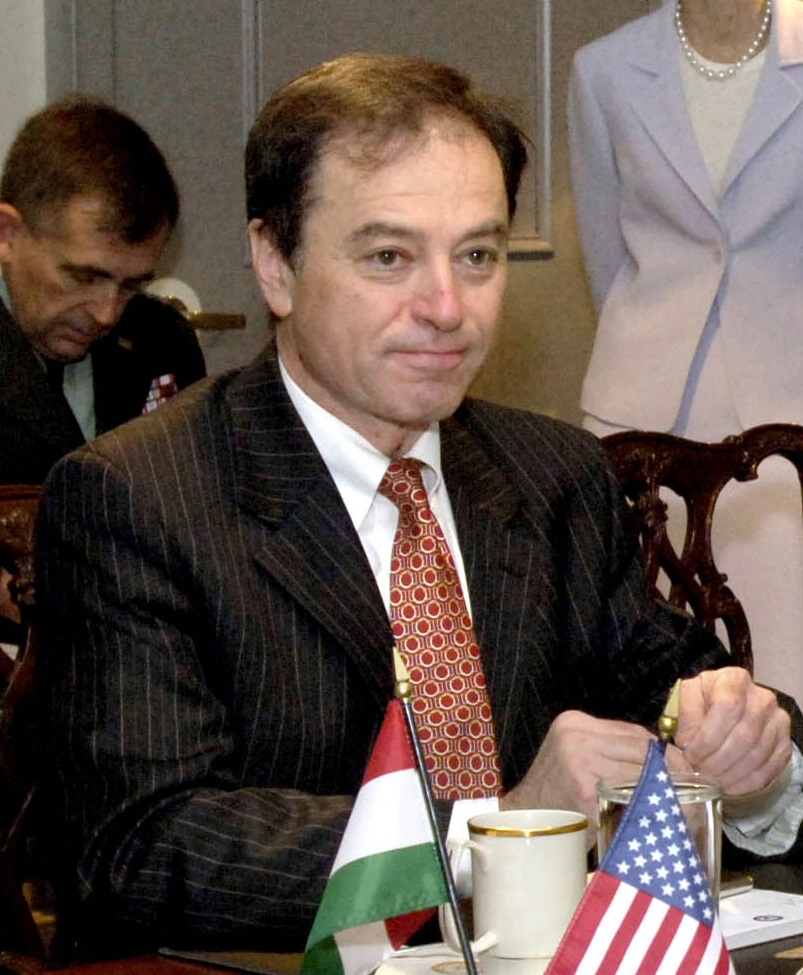

Hungarian Ambassador to the United States
- In office 25 September 2002 – July 2007
- Preceded by: Géza Jeszenszky
- Succeeded by: Ferenc Somogyi

Hungarian Ambassador to the North Atlantic Treaty Organization (Head of the Liaison Office to NATO until 1999)
- In office 1995–2001
- Preceded by: Inaugural

Personal details
- Born: 16 May 1952 (age 74) Budapest, Hungary

András Simonyi (born 16 May 1952) is a former Hungarian ambassador, transportation economist, and author. He was the Hungarian ambassador to the United States between 2002 and 2007. He was also Hungary's first ambassador to the North Atlantic Treaty Organization.

Simonyi plays guitar in a rock band, The Coalition of the Willing (est.2003) with guitarist Jeff "Skunk" Baxter which has Antony Blinken as a regular guest.

He is the author of "Rocking Toward a Free World: When the Stratocaster beat the Kalashnikov" (Hatchette, 2019) about the influence of rock. He has appeared several times on The Colbert Report.

== Early childhood ==
Simonyi was born 16 May 1952 in Budapest to a Catholic Mother and a Jewish father. As a four-year-old, he witnessed Soviet tanks roll past his home during the 1956 Hungarian Revolution. In 1961, Simony's father's profession as a textile engineer took the family to Copenhagen, Denmark, where they lived for five years. In Denmark, Simonyi attended British-run international-school and Danish government school, learning Danish and English. His family returned to Hungary 1967.

Simonyi majored in transport economics at the Karl Marx University of Economics in Budapest. He graduated in 1975, writing his thesis on Denmark's security policy in the 20th century. He has a PhD in International Affairs.

== Career ==
Simonyi worked with youth exchange programs, in particular the State Committee for Youth and the World Federation of Democratic Youth (WFDY), a "frontline" organization speaking out against the imperialist practices of capitalist countries and of NATO. This work brought him into contact with the American Council of Young Political Leaders. From 1984 to 1989 he worked for the now defunct Hungarian Socialist Workers' Party in the foreign relations department with Gyula Horn and László Kovács, both architects of the changes in Eastern Europe in 1989.

In 1995, Simonyi became the first Hungarian Ambassador to NATO, and from 1999 until 2001 he was Hungary's first permanent representative to the alliance.

Simonyi was appointed ambassador to the U.S. in 2002 under the administration of Prime Minister Péter Medgyessy and presented his credentials on 25 September 2002. He replaced ambassador Géza Jeszenszky, who left office in August, 2002. Simonyi held the position until 2007.

In 2007, Simonyi was appointed chairman of Korda Studios.

In 2014, Simonyi, along with Nancy Brinker of the Susan G. Komen Foundation, former U.S. ambassador to Hungary and Ambassador David Huebner, the gay U.S. Ambassador to New Zealand, started "Ambassadors for Equality," an initiative to support LGBT rights around the world. Fifty current and former ambassadors have signed the pledge. In an interview, Simonyi said "[Affirming LGBT rights] should not be seen as an American endeavor because the U.S. cannot and should not do it alone because then it becomes an American thing and gets tangled in the anti-American sentiments we see in other countries. But if the U.S. and other countries hold hands for LGBT rights, then that makes a difference."

Simonyi is a senior fellow at the Global Energy Center Atlantic Council of the United States.

=== Academia ===
In November 2010, Simonyi began a tour of American university and college centers. He focused his lectures on building transatlantic relationships through innovation.

From 2012 to 2018 he was the managing director of the Center for Transatlantic Relations at the Paul Nitze School of Advanced International Studies at Johns Hopkins University in Washington DC. He is associated with the George Washington University.

=== Appearances on The Colbert Report ===
On 9 August 2006, the character Stephen Colbert, (played by Stephen Colbert the actor) announced on his political talk show The Colbert Report that The Ministry of Transport of Hungary was soliciting suggestions for the name of a new bridge to be built over the Danube River north of Budapest, completing the M0 motorway-loop around the city. On 14 September 2006, Simonyi appeared on The Colbert Report to discuss the bridgey The since-named Megyeri Bridge, completed in 2008, spans the River Danube just north of Budapest. Colbert (a U.S. citizen) had hoped the Hungarian government would name the innovative bridge after him, leading to the ambassador's appearance on the show.

Voting was taking place in an online poll on the Ministry's website. On 8 August 2006, the newswire service Reuters reported that Chuck Norris was the leading candidate.

Simonyi appeared on the 10 April 2007 episode, in response to comments Colbert claimed to have made on his supposed radio show, Colbert on the Ert, about Hungarians' lack of guitar playing talent, in a parody of Don Imus' recent comments about the Rutgers women's basketball team. After referring to the alleged scandal throughout the episode, the ambassador appeared suddenly in the tag playing an electric guitar live. After Simonyi offered Colbert the Hungarian-made eagle-headed guitar, Colbert apologized, they both agreed that the Finnish could not play guitar, and Simonyi played as the show went to credits.

=== Literary work ===
"Rocking Toward a Free World: When the Stratocaster Beat the Kalashnikov" is a 2019 memoir about Simonyi's childhood and youth, growing up behind the Iron Curtain with Western Rock and Roll music being his defining experience. "When I listened to that station, it was as if I had once again become one with my friends in the West. I closed my eyes and the border disappeared", he says in the book.

== Personal life ==
Simonyi lives in the United States. He is married and has two children. His greatest influence are his parents. He considers Winston Churchill a role model.

=== Music ===
As a seven year old, Simonyi met American singer Paul Robeson in Budapest, which sealed his love of American blues music. In 1963 he heard the Beatles for the first time and has been a rock devotee ever since.

His first rock band was called the Purple Generator. In 2003, while ambassador to the United States, he became a founding member of The Coalition of the Willing with Jeff "Skunk" Baxter (Steely Dan, Doobie Brothers), Linc Bloomfield (bass), Dan Poneman (guitar), Alexander "Sandy" Vershbow (drums 2003–2004) and Dan McDermot (drums 2004–present). Former U.S. Secretary of State Antony Blinken (guitar, vocals) has played with the band since 2016.

Diplomatic posts
Preceded by Géza Jeszenszky	Hungarian Ambassador to the United States; 2002–2007	Succeeded by Ferenc Somogyi
