= Réka Szemerkényi =

Hungarian diplomat, economist, political scientist and politician

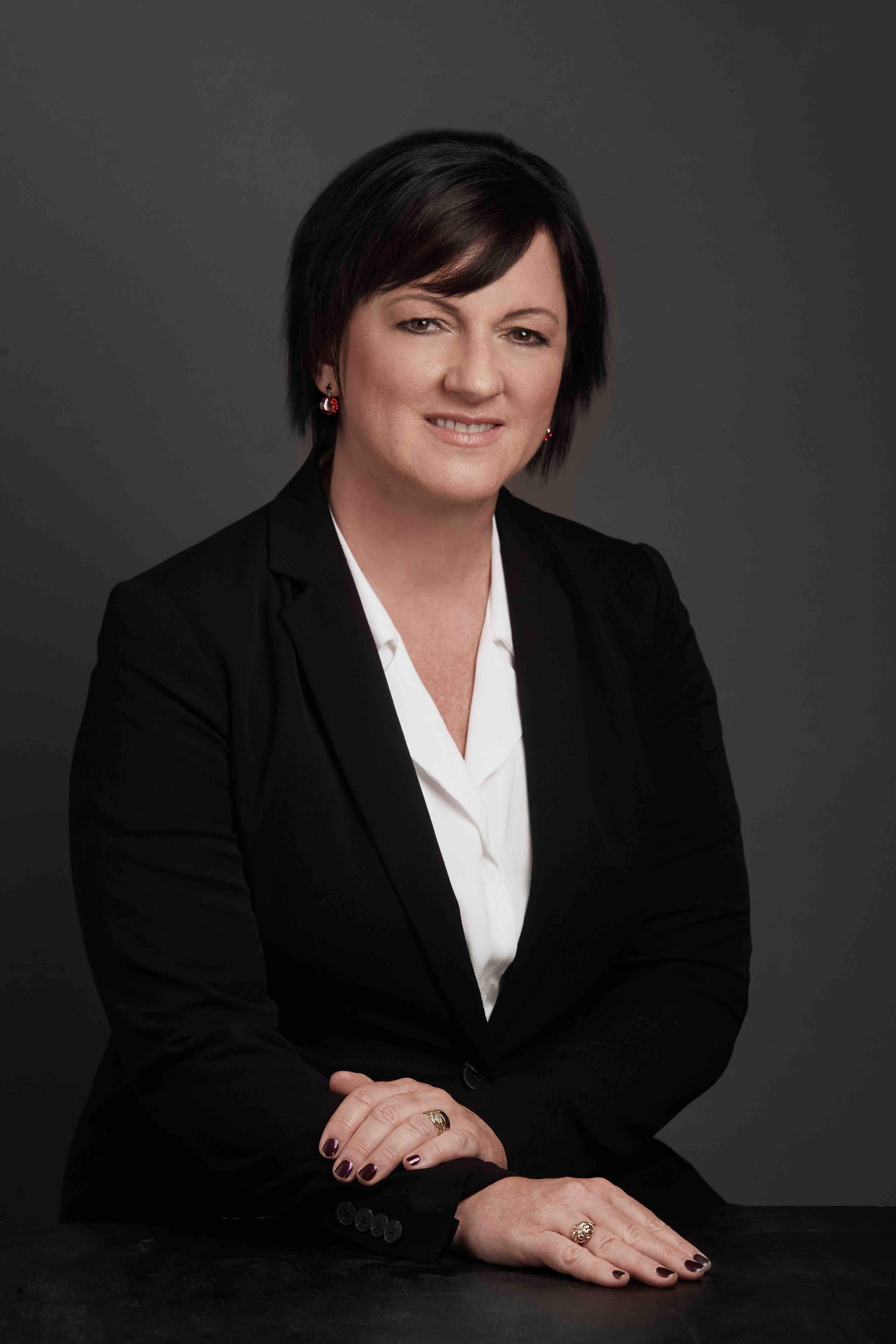
- Szemerkényi in 2018

Hungarian Ambassador to the United States
- In office 21 January 2015 – July 2017
- Preceded by: György Szapáry
- Succeeded by: László Szabó

Personal details
- Political party: independent
- Profession: Diplomat; economist

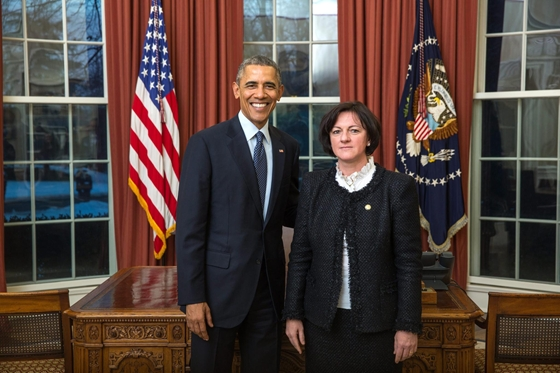
Szemerkényi with U.S. President Barack Obama in February 2015

Réka Szemerkényi is a Hungarian economist, political scientist and politician, who was the Hungarian ambassador to the United States from 2015 to 2017. She was state secretary for foreign policy and national security advisor to the Prime Minister of Hungary Viktor Orbán from 1998 to 2002.

Diplomatic posts
Preceded by György Szapáry	Hungarian Ambassador to the United States; 2015–2017	Succeeded by László Szabó
