= György Bánlaki =

Hungarian diplomat

György Bánlaki (born 21 March 1948 in Budapest) is a Hungarian diplomat who served as Hungarian Ambassador to the United States between 1994 and 1998. He was also President of the Hungarian Atlantic Council from 2003 to 2009.

== Sources ==
- Baráth, Magdolna; Gecsényi, Lajos, eds. (2015). Főkonzulok, követek és nagykövetek 1945–1990 [Consuls General, Envoys, Ambassadors 1945–1990] (in Hungarian). MTA Bölcsészettudományi Kutatóközpont. ISBN 978-963-416-007-6.

Diplomatic posts
Preceded by Pál Tar	Hungarian Ambassador to the United States; 1994–1998	Succeeded by Géza Jeszenszky
