= László Kovács (politician) =

Hungarian politician (born 1939)

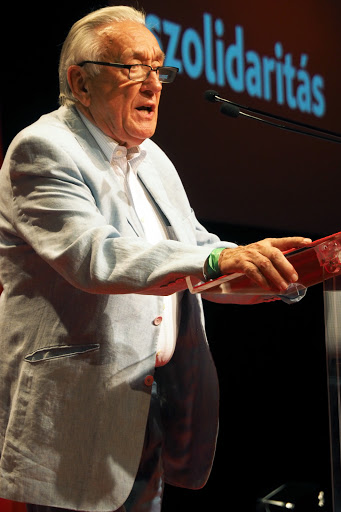
- Kovács in 2014

European Commissioner for Taxation and Customs Union
- In office 22 November 2004 – 9 February 2010
- President: José Manuel Barroso
- Preceded by: Frits Bolkestein (Internal Market, Taxation and Customs Union)
- Succeeded by: Algirdas Šemeta (Taxation and Customs Union, Audit and Anti-Fraud)

Minister of Foreign Affairs of Hungary
- In office 27 May 2002 – 31 October 2004
- Prime Minister: Péter Medgyessy; Ferenc Gyurcsány
- Preceded by: János Martonyi
- Succeeded by: Ferenc Somogyi
- In office 15 July 1994 – 8 July 1998
- Prime Minister: Gyula Horn
- Preceded by: Géza Jeszenszky
- Succeeded by: János Martonyi

Personal details
- Born: 3 July 1939 (age 86) Budapest, Hungary
- Party: MSZMP (1963–1989); MSZP (1989– )
- Spouses: Mária Éva Tóth (m. 1968; div. 2013) Mónika Kovács (m. 2015)
- Children: Dóra; László

László Kovács (Hungarian pronunciation: [ˈlaːsloː ˈkovaːt͡ʃ]; born 3 July 1939) is a Hungarian politician and diplomat, former European Commissioner for Taxation and Customs Union. He was the foreign minister of Hungary twice, from 1994 to 1998 and from 2002 to 2004. He also served as chairman of the Hungarian Socialist Party (MSZP) from 1998 to 2004.

== Studies ==
László Kovács was born in Budapest on 3 July 1939. He finished at Petrik Lajos Technical School of Industrial Chemistry in 1957. From 1957 to 1966 he worked as a chemical technician. He graduated from the Foreign Trade Department of the Karl Marx University of Economics in 1968 and from the College of Politics of the Hungarian Socialist Workers' Party (MSZMP) in 1980.

== Party career ==
He joined the Hungarian Socialist Workers' Party in 1963. From 1966 he worked for the International Department of the Central Committee of the Hungarian Young Communist League (KISZ) and was subsequently its director. He worked for the Foreign Affairs Department of the Central Committee of the Hungarian Socialist Workers' Party from 1975, acting as deputy director from 1983 to 1986. He was Deputy Minister of Foreign Affairs from May 1986 and Secretary of State for Foreign Affairs from May 1989 to May 1990. He was elected a member of the party's Central Committee (KB) in April 1989.

Kovács was a founder of the Hungarian Socialist Party (MSZP) in October 1989, becoming a member of the presidium of the National Board in May 1990. He was party spokesman on foreign affairs from November 1990. He became party chairman on 5 September 1998, replacing Gyula Horn. He was confirmed in this office on 29 March 2003, however he resigned in 2004, when he was appointed European Commissioner.

== Political positions ==
He was a Member of Parliament since 1990 (having been elected from the party's National List in 1990, from the Győr-Moson-Sopron County Regional List in 1994 and 1998 and from the Budapest Regional List in 2002). From 1990 to 1994 he was a member of the Hungarian delegation to the Parliamentary Assembly of the Council of Europe, becoming deputy leader of the delegation after the change of government following the 1998 parliamentary election. From 1998 until the 2002 parliamentary election he was deputy leader of the delegations to the NATO Parliamentary Assembly and the Western European Union Assembly. He was a member of the Committee of Wise Persons of the Council of Europe.

Kovács served as Minister of Foreign Affairs in the Cabinet of Gyula Horn from 15 July 1994 to 8 July 1998. From June 1998 to December 2000 he was the leader of the Socialists' parliamentary group and deputy leader from January 2001. He secured a seat on the Budapest Regional List in April 2002. Since 27 May 2002 he had once again been in charge of Hungarian diplomacy as foreign minister until 30 September 2004.

=== EU career ===
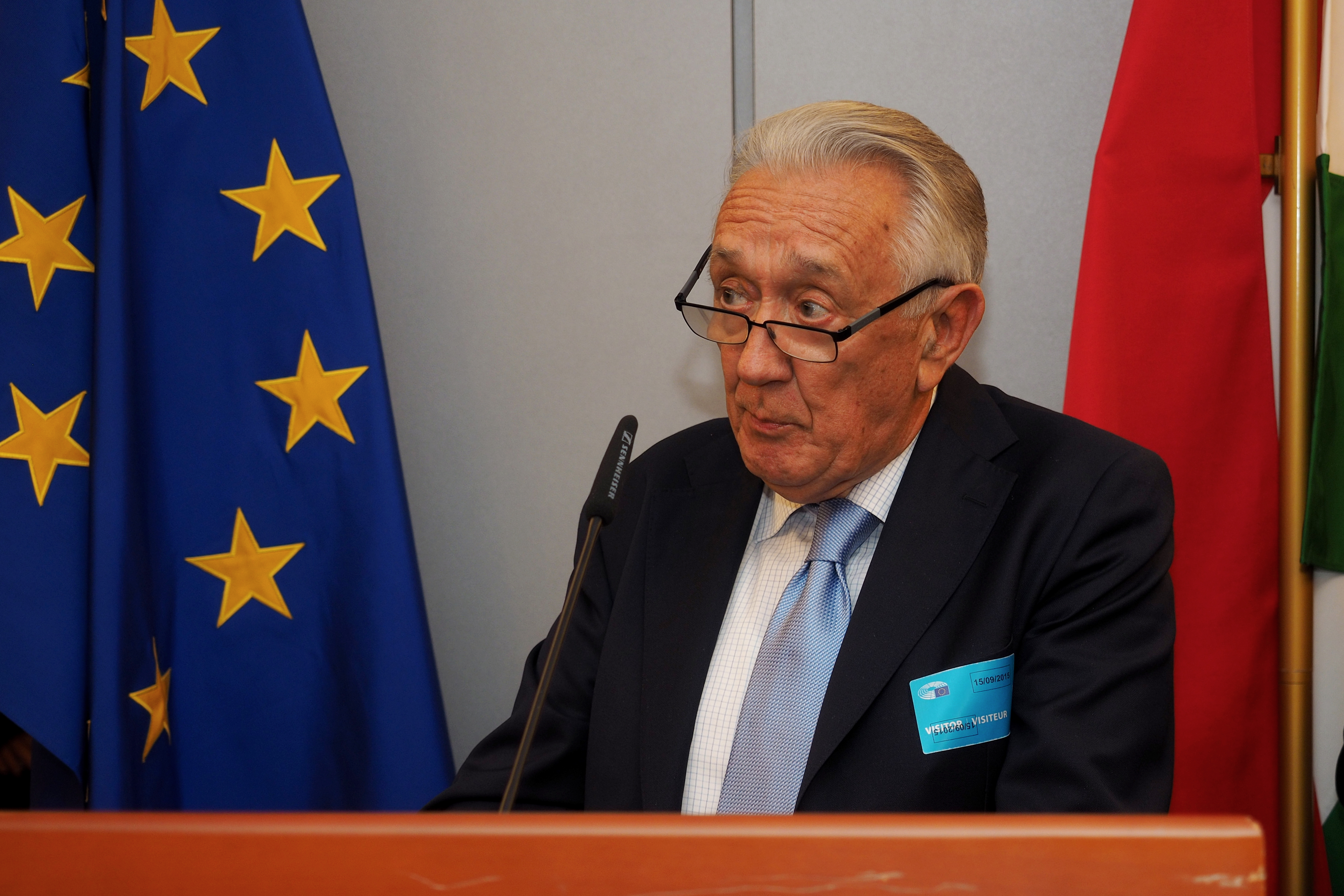
László Kovács in September 2015

His name linked to the 31 March 1998 opening of negotiations on accession to the European Union, as well as to the completion of these negotiations on 13 December 2002. At the beginning of November 2003 the twenty-five members of the Presidential Committee of Socialist International elected him deputy chairman representing the entire Central and East European Region. During the European Parliament elections on 13 June 2004 he headed his party's list.

In 2004, Kovács was nominated to serve as the Hungarian member of the European Commission, which was to take office on 1 November 2004. His apparent unsuitability for his proposed role as Energy Commissioner was one of the reasons why the European Parliament refused to endorse the proposed new Commission. However, the Hungarian government did not nominate a new commissioner in his place, therefore in the revised setup of the commission, serving from 22 November 2004, he was finally appointed as Commissioner responsible for Taxation and Customs Union.

László Andor became the next Hungarian European Commissioner in the second Barroso Commission. Kovács returned to Hungary and was elected to the National Assembly of Hungary from the party's National List during the 2010 parliamentary election.

== Personal life ==
He married Mária Éva Tóth in 1968. The couple had a daughter, Dóra (born in 1977). Mária Éva died in 2013. He has a son, László (born in 2011) from another relationship. He remarried in 2015.

Political offices
Preceded by Géza Jeszenszky	Minister of Foreign Affairs; 1994–1998	Succeeded by János Martonyi
Preceded by Gyula Horn	Leader of the Opposition; 1998–2002	Succeeded by Zoltán Pokorni
Preceded by János Martonyi	Minister of Foreign Affairs; 2002–2004	Succeeded by Ferenc Somogyi
Preceded by Péter Balázs	Hungarian European Commissioner; 2004–2010	Succeeded by László Andor
Preceded by Frits Bolkestein as European Commissioner for Internal Market, Taxation and Customs Union	European Commissioner for Taxation and Customs Union; 2004–2010	Succeeded by Algirdas Šemeta as European Commissioner for Taxation and Customs Union, Audit and Anti-Fraud
National Assembly of Hungary
Preceded by Imre Szekeres	Leader of the MSZP parliamentary group 1998–2000	Succeeded by Sándor Nagy
Party political offices
Preceded by Gyula Horn	Chairman of the Hungarian Socialist Party; 1998–2004	Succeeded by István Hiller
Diplomatic posts
Preceded by Antonio Martino; Italy	Chairman-in-Office of the OSCE; 1995	Succeeded by Flavio Cotti; Switzerland
Succeeded by István Hiller
