= Péter Zwack =

Hungarian businessman and politician (1927–2012)

Hungarian Ambassador to the United States
- In office 1990 – April 1991
- Preceded by: Péter Várkonyi
- Succeeded by: Pál Tar

Personal details
- Born: Péter Zwack; 21 May 1927 Budapest, Hungary
- Died: 5 August 2012 (aged 85) Venturina Terme, Italy
- Citizenship: Hungarian; American
- Party: Entrepreneurs' Party; Alliance of Free Democrats
- Spouse(s): Iris Rogers (1953–1969); Anne Marshall (1973–2012)
- Children: 7
- Education: University of Budapest (1946–1947); University of Milan
- Profession: Businessman (Zwack)
- Known for: CEO of Zwack (1987–2008)

Péter János Zwack (21 May 1927 – 5 August 2012) was a Hungarian businessman, investor, philanthropist, diplomat and the Hungarian Ambassador to the United States from 1990 until 1991. He was the CEO and owner of the company Zwack.

== Early life and education ==
Zwack was born in Budapest on May 21, 1927, to Vera Wahl and János Zwack. He was born into a prominent family that owns Zwack, a company that makes liqueurs and spirits and is known specifically for producing Unicum.

Zwack attended the Szent Imre Grammar School of the Cistercian Order. Following his graduation in 1945, he studied at Peter Pazmany University in Budapest.

During World War II Budapest and the Zwack factory were completely destroyed. After the war, in 1948, the new Communist regime nationalized the factory. That same year, the Zwack family fled to the United States. The family left behind a fake recipe for Unicom and brought the original recipe with them to the United States.

After several months in Ellis Island's refugee camp were granted US entry purely because they possessed the recipe for Unicom. Zwack had the recipe split up and stored in four safety deposit boxes throughout New York City. They later settled in the Bronx in 1949 when Zwack was 22. He sold vacuum cleaners for a while before finding work in the wine and spirits industry.

While living in Chicago in 1956, Zwack, former president Herbert Hoover, Tibor Eckhard, and Sargent Shriver founded a charity named First Aid for Hungary which helped the refugees of the Hungarian Revolution of 1956.

In 1971, he moved to Florence, Italy, to work with a relative producing small quantities of Unicum. Zwack was invited to return to Hungary in 1987 and, after accepting the invitation, began working toward reclaiming control of the family distillery taken during the war.

In 1990, Zwack was Invited to serve as the Hungarian ambassador. He accepted the position and, in September 1990, renounced his U.S. citizenship. He served for seven months before being removed due to conflict with the deputy chief of mission.

=== Political career in Hungary ===
Zwack became chairman of the Entrepreneurs' Party in 1992. Two years later, he made an electoral alliance with SZDSZ, Fidesz and the Agrarian Alliance, according to which he was the joint candidate of the four parties in Kecskemét during the 1994 Hungarian parliamentary election. He won a seat in the National Assembly of Hungary as the only independent MP. He resigned from his party leader position in 1995. Between 1995 and 1997, he was a member of the Kossuth Prize and Széchenyi Prize Committee.

During the 1998 Hungarian parliamentary election, he was supported by SZDSZ, but he did not repeat his success four years ago. After that, he joined SZDSZ. In 1999, he became a member of the party's leadership. He was one of the party's chargé d'affaires from 2000 to 2003. In 2002, he was elected as a member of the parliament again, but he resigned a half year later.

In 2008, his son, Sandor Zwack, took over as chief executive of Zwack Unicum.

== Personal life ==
Zwack married Iris Rogers in 1953. Together they had six children: Peter (1954), Gioia (1956), Alexa (1959), Iris (1961) and John (1965). They were married until 1969. He married Anne Marshall in 1973 and had two children together: a son, Sándor (1974), and a daughter, Izabella (1976).

Zwack died in Italy on 4 August 2012 at the age of 85.

Diplomatic posts
Preceded by Péter Várkonyi	Hungarian Ambassador to the United States; 1990–1991	Succeeded by Pál Tar
