= Pál Tar =

Hungarian businessman and diplomat

Pál Tar (born 23 December 1931) is a Hungarian businessman and diplomat, a former Hungarian Ambassador to the United States between 1991 and 1994.

Diplomatic posts
Preceded by Péter Zwack	Hungarian Ambassador to the United States; 1991–1994	Succeeded by György Bánlaki
