= Ferenc Somogyi =

Hungarian politician

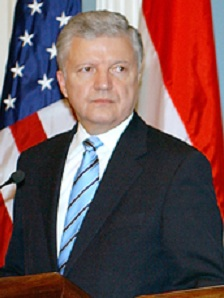
- Somogyi in 2005

Minister of Foreign Affairs
- In office 1 November 2004 – 9 June 2006
- Prime Minister: Ferenc Gyurcsány
- Preceded by: László Kovács
- Succeeded by: Kinga Göncz

Personal details
- Born: 1 September 1945 Hartkirchen, Austria
- Died: 30 March 2021 (aged 75) Budapest, Hungary
- Party: Independent
- Spouse: Andrea Somogyi
- Children: Bence; Balázs and 1 daughter
- Profession: Diplomat

Ferenc Somogyi (1 September 1945 – 30 March 2021) was a Hungarian ambassador to the United States.

== Career ==
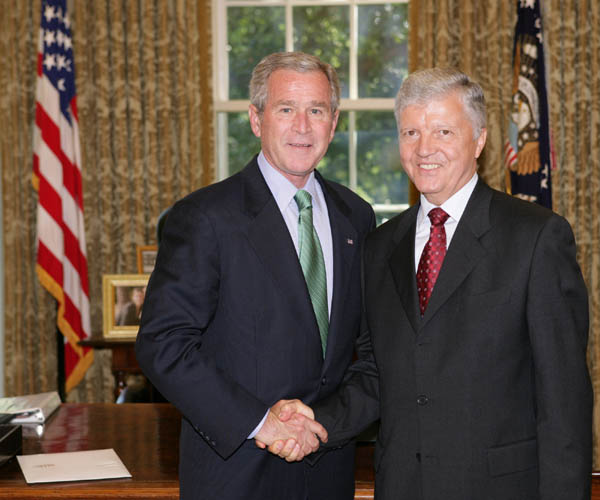
Ferenc Somogyi with President Bush upon presentation of his credentials as Ambassador to the U.S., September 18, 2007

A former businessman, he is a member of the Hungarian Socialist Party and served as foreign minister from November 1, 2004 until a cabinet shuffle in June 2006. His appointment to that position was announced in September 2004. Previously, he was the deputy ambassador to the United Nations during the 1980s in Hungary's communist government, and was a telephone company executive during the 1990s. In late 2007, Somogyi was appointed Hungarian Ambassador to the United States.

== Private life ==
Father of three children.

Political offices
Preceded by László Kovács	Minister of Foreign Affairs; 2004–2006	Succeeded by Kinga Göncz
Diplomatic posts
Preceded by András Simonyi	Hungarian Ambassador to the United States; 2007–2009	Succeeded by Béla Szombati
