= Géza Jeszenszky =

Hungarian politician (born 1941)

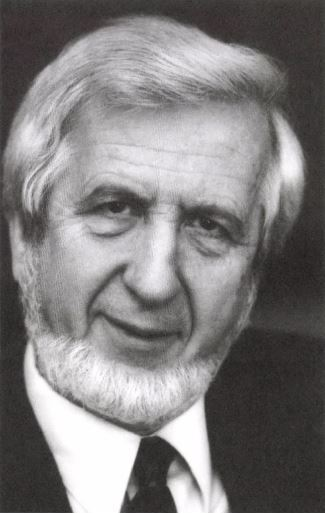

Minister of Foreign Affairs of Hungary
- In office 23 May 1990 – 15 July 1994
- Prime Minister: József Antall Péter Boross
- Preceded by: Gyula Horn
- Succeeded by: László Kovács

Personal details
- Born: 10 November 1941 (age 84) Budapest, Hungary
- Party: Hungarian Democratic Forum
- Spouse: Edit Héjj
- Children: Zsolt; Réka
- Profession: politician

Géza Jeszenszky (born 10 November 1941) is a Hungarian politician and associate professor, former Minister of Foreign Affairs and a former ambassador to the United States. He was ambassador of Hungary to Norway and Iceland from 2011 to 2014.

== Family ==
He was born as Géza Jeszenszky de Nagyjeszen (Hungarian: nagyjeszeni Jeszenszky Géza) in Budapest into the Jeszenszky family of noble origin from Túróc County (today Turiec in Slovakia). His paternal grandfather was Géza Jeszenszky Sr., a lawyer who married Jolán Puchly, daughter of 1848 freedom fighter János Puchly. Their son was Zoltán Jeszenszky (1895–1986), a banker.

His maternal grandfather was János Miskolczy-Simon, who fought in World War I and died near Lemberg (now Lviv in Ukraine) in 1914. He married Sarolta Kovács, a music teacher and pianist. Their daughter was Pálma Miskolczy-Simon (b. 1910), who inherited her mother's pianist vocation.

== Education ==
Géza Jeszenszky finished his primary and secondary studies in Budapest. His class tutor and history teacher was József Antall. For two years his entire class cohort was restricted from university admission because of a commemoration they held for the Hungarian Revolution of 1956. He attended the Eötvös Loránd University Faculty of Humanities between 1961 and 1966.

== Political career ==
He took part in the 1956 Revolution at the age of 15, without weapon. As a professor, he often wrote articles in underground publications against Marxism and the ruling Hungarian Socialist Worker's Party (MSZMP).

In 1987, he took part in the Lakitelek Summit where he, along with many opposition politicians and white-collar workers, founded the Hungarian Democratic Forum. He was the Chairman of the new party's Committee on Foreign Affairs from 1988 to 1990. The MDF won the first parliamentary elections in Hungary, and Prime Minister József Antall appointed his former pupil as Minister of Foreign Affairs.

During his tenure he had a significant role in dissolution of the Warsaw Pact and the withdrawal of Soviet troops from the territory of the country. Hungary joined the Council of Europe, the Visegrád Group and the Central European Initiative, and also became a party to the Association Agreement with the European Communities. He began efforts to incorporate the Euro-Atlantic structures, completed successfully (in 1999 and 2004).

In the 1994 election he won a seat in the National Assembly and together with the MDF was in the opposition. In 1995 he became President of the Hungarian Atlantic Council. From 1998 to 2002 he served a mission as Hungarian Ambassador Extraordinary and Plenipotentiary in the United States.

In September 2002 he returned to work lecturer at the Budapest University of Economics and Public Administration. He taught as visiting professor in the College of Europe in Natolin and the Babeș-Bolyai University in Cluj-Napoca.

== Controversial remarks on Romani ==
In November 2012, Jeszenszky came under fire for using controversial remarks on Romani in a university course book he wrote while lecturing as a professor at Budapest's Corvinus University. Jeszenszky wrote in 2004: "The reason why many Roma are mentally ill is because in Roma culture it is permitted for sisters and brothers or cousins to marry each other or just to have sexual intercourse with each other." When the news about the article emerged the ambassador was asked by organizers of a Holocaust symposium in Oslo commemorating the Swedish diplomat Raoul Wallenberg, who saved thousands of Hungarian Jews during the Second World War, not to attend. University scholars and politicians in Hungary called on Jeszenszky to resign as ambassador.

Hungary's Foreign Ministry issued a statement saying that Jeszenszky had made his remarks as a university teacher, not as diplomat: "Although the lines in question are open to misinterpretation, Géza Jeszenszky’s lifelong work and most recent publications prove that he stands on the side of minority rights and cannot be accused of prejudice." Foreign Minister János Martonyi publicly expressed full confidence in Jeszenszky.

Jeszenszky told the news agency MTI that the chapter in question was supported by a wealth of academic research (a contention disputed by the authors of the protest letter). "Looking at this interpretation with a sober mind will reveal nothing offensive, and leveling accusations of racism is an outrageous slander," he reportedly declared. "Even a committed Roma rights activist would be unable to take exception to the way the theme is presented. Hundreds of Hungarian and foreign students have found my book useful," Jeszenszky was quoted as saying. In May 2013 the vice rector of Corvinus University set up an academic commission to evaluate the issue; the commission found that claim in the textbook "cannot be sustained".

== Assassination attempt ==
Jeszenszky and his wife were violently assaulted outside their home in Budapest on 1 June 2025. The assailant attacked both of them with a hammer in what appears to be a targeted assassination attempt. Jeszenszky sustained a life-threatening skull injury and was immediately hospitalized and underwent emergency surgery. Following the attack, the former politician recalled that has received multiple threats over the years mostly for the 1993 Hungarian–Ukrainian treaty, which he drafted as foreign minister. Jeszenszky also revealed the same man had attacked him in 2023 too but the assailant managed to escape at the time.

== Works ==
- The Outlines of the History of International Relations in the 20th Century, Közgazdasági Továbbképző Intézet, Budapest, 1984.
- Az elveszett presztízs. Magyarország megítélésének megváltozása Nagy-Britanniában, 1894-1918, Magvető Kiadó, Budapest, 1986, ISBN 963-14-0653-9
- Az elveszett presztízs. Magyarország megítélésének megváltozása Nagy-Britanniában, 1894-1918, Magyar Szemle Alapítvány, Budapest, 1994, ISBN 963-85171-0-7
- The New (Post-Communist) Europe and Its Ethnic Problems, Kairosz, Budapest, 2005.
- A politikus Antall József – az európai úton. Tanulmányok, esszék, emlékezések a kortársaktól, (co-editor along with Károly Kapronczay and Szilárd Biernaczky), Mundus Magyar Egyetemi Kiadó, Budapest, 2006.
- "Lost Prestige: Hungary's Changing Image in Britain 1894-1918". Helena History Press, Reno NV USA, 2020,ISBN 978-1-943596-17-1

Political offices
Preceded by Gyula Horn	Minister of Foreign Affairs; 1990–1994	Succeeded by László Kovács
Diplomatic posts
Preceded by György Bánlaki	Hungarian Ambassador to the United States; 1998–2002	Succeeded by András Simonyi
