= Károly Kovács =

Hungarian jurist and diplomat

Hungarian Charge d'Affaires ad interim to the United States
- In office 8 April 1975 – 14 July 1975
- Preceded by: Károly Szabó
- Succeeded by: Ferenc Esztergályos

Personal details
- Born: 4 November 1931; Solt, Hungary
- Died: 20 October 2007 (aged 75); Budapest, Hungary
- Political party: MSZMP
- Profession: politician

Károly Kovács (4 November 1931 – 20 October 2007) was a Hungarian jurist and diplomat, who served as Hungarian Charge d'Affaires ad interim to the United States in 1975.

He entered foreign service in 1965. He subsequently served in Ottawa (1965–1970). He was a Hungarian delegate at the International Commission of Control and Supervision (ICCS) between 1973 and 1974, during the final stage of the Vietnam War. He was Deputy Chief of Mission at the Embassy of Hungary in Washington, D.C. from 1974 to 1978. Returning home, he belonged to the Foreign Affairs Department's staff of the Hungarian Socialist Workers' Party (MSZMP) between 1978 and 1984.

He served as Hungarian Ambassador to Pakistan between 1984 and 1988, Then he was head of the foreign service's Personnel and Education Department between 1988 and 1990. After that he served as Hungarian Ambassador to the Philippines from 1991 to 1993. He retired on 31 December 1993.

== Sources ==
- Baráth, Magdolna; Gecsényi, Lajos, eds. (2015). Főkonzulok, követek és nagykövetek 1945–1990 [Consuls General, Envoys, Ambassadors 1945–1990] (in Hungarian). MTA Bölcsészettudományi Kutatóközpont. ISBN 978-963-416-007-6.

Diplomatic posts
| Preceded by Károly Szabó | Hungarian Charge d'Affaires ad interim to the United States; 1975 | Succeeded by Ferenc Esztergályos |
| Preceded by József Ferró | Hungarian Ambassador to Pakistan; 1984–1988 | Succeeded by András Dallos |
| Preceded by Péter Trunk | Hungarian Ambassador to the Philippines; 1991–1993 | Succeeded by ? |
