= Miklós Radnóti =

Hungarian poet (1909–1944)

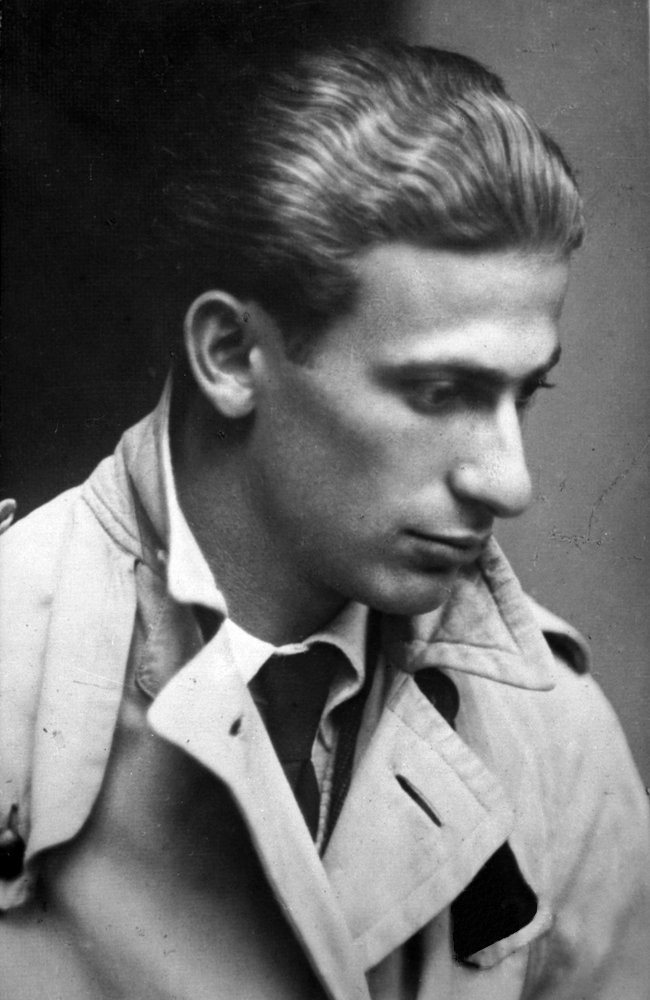
- Miklós Radnóti
- Born: Miklós Glatter; 5 May 1909; Budapest, Austria-Hungary
- Died: November 1944 (aged 35) near Abda, Hungary
- Resting place: Fiumei Road Cemetery, Budapest, Hungary (Plot 41-2-44)
- Education: Franz Joseph University, Szeged (1930–1934)
- Occupations: Poet, translator, teacher
- Spouse: Fanni Gyarmati (m. 1935–1944)
- Writing career
- Notable awards: Baumgarten Prize (1937); Hungarian Heritage Award (2001, posthumous)

Miklós Radnóti (born Miklós Glatter, surname variants: Radnói, Radnóczi; 5 May 1909 – 4 or 9 November 1944) was a Hungarian poet, an outstanding representative of modern Hungarian lyric poetry as well as a certified secondary school teacher of Hungarian and French. He is characterised by his striving for pure genre and his revival of traditional, tried and tested genres.

== Biography ==
Miklós Radnóti, born as Miklós Glatter, descended from a long line of Hungarian Jewish village merchants, peddlers, and pub keepers in Radnót, in what is now Slovakia.

At the time of his birth, Miklós Glatter's father, Jakab Glatter, worked as a travelling salesman for the Brück & Grosz textile company, which was owned by his brother in law. He was born in the 13th district (Újlipótváros quarter) of Budapest, the capital city of the Kingdom of Hungary. At birth, his twin brother was born dead and his mother, Ilona Grosz, died soon after childbirth. His father remarried in 1911 with Ilona Molnár (1885–1944). In 1921 his father died of stroke, his guardian became his aunt's husband, Dezső Grosz, who was one of the owners of the textile company his father worked for until his death.

Radnóti attended primary and secondary school in his place of birth and continued his education at the high school for textile industry in Liberec from 1927–28 on his uncle's advice. Then he worked as commercial correspondent in the familiar textile business company until 1930. Ultimately, Radnóti was able to prevail with desire for another education and began studying philosophy, Hungarian and French at the University of Szeged.

In 1934, he finished his studies with the philosophical doctoral thesis The artistic development of Margit Kaffka. After graduation, he Magyarised his surname to Radnóti, after the native village of his paternal ancestors. In August 1935, he married his long-standing love Fanny Gyarmati (1912–2014), daughter of the owner of the respected Gyarmati printing house. The very happy marriage was unfortunately childless until his deportation. He gained his first professional experiences as secondary school teacher in the 1935-36 academic year at the Zsigmond Kemény Gymnasium in Budapest.

In September 1940, he was conscripted to a labor battalion (a kind of unarmed military service, initially for those unfit for armed service, but increasingly, as the world war progressed, a punishment for citizens considered untrustworthy like leftists, dissidents, Jews) of the Royal Hungarian Army until December of that year, then from July 1942 to April 1943 for the second time. On 2 May 1943, he converted together with his wife from Judaism to the Roman Catholic faith. In May 1944, Radnóti's third military labor service started and his battalion was deployed to the copper mines of Bor in Serbia. After 1943, Hungarian Jewish forced laborers working in Bor's copper mines contributed to 50 percent of the copper used by the German war industry. The overseers of the forced laborers of Bor were particularly notorious for their cruelty.

On 17 September 1944, the battalion was commanded to leave the camp on foot in two groups in a forced march to flee the advancing Allied armies. Radnóti was in the first group (about 3600 forced laborers), around half of the group perished. The overseers of the second group were ambushed by Yugoslav partisans before departure and all forced laborers survived. Radnóti endured inhuman conditions while being forced to walk from Bor to Szentkirályszabadja, where he wrote his last poem on 31 October.

== Murder and its aftermath ==
In November 1944, because of their total physical and mental exhaustion, Radnóti and twenty other prisoners were fatally shot and buried in a mass grave near the dam at Abda, by a guard squad of a commander and four soldiers of the Royal Hungarian Army. Different dates of this mass murder have been given. Some publications specify a day in the period from 6 to 10 November. In the detailed and scientific exhibition of 2009 by the Hungarian Academy of Sciences, 4 November was claimed to be the date of death.

On 19 June 1946, the mass grave in Abda was exhumed, and personal documents, letters and photographs were found. On 25 June 1946, Radnóti was reburied in the Jewish cemetery of Győr, together with twenty-one other victims.

On 12 August 1946, his widow, Fanni Gyarmati went to Győr with Gyula Ortutay, Gábor Tolnai and Dezső Baróti to identify the body of her husband that was exhumed for the second time. In his work titled Ecce homo (Canadian Hungarian Newspaper, 2011), Tamás Szemenyei-Kiss describes how at the time of the second exhumation in Győr, Fanni Gyarmati had not seen her husband and was shown several objects that had never belonged to Radnóti. Therefore, at the time of the third burial, she was no longer sure that the closed coffin really contained her husband's remains. Miklós Radnóti's third funeral service in Budapest was held in public on 14 August 1946. The Tridentine Requiem Mass was offered by Radnóti's former spiritual director, Fr. Sándor Sík. Gyula Ortutay gave a eulogy on behalf of his friends. Radnóti was laid to rest in the Fiume Road Graveyard in Budapest, in plot 41, grave number 41.

The commander of the guards involved in the mass murder, Sgt. András Tálas, immediately joined the Communist Party of Hungary after the end of the Second World War, but he was arrested as part of a Stalinist political purge on 7 August 1945. He was tried and convicted by a post-war People's Court for his cruelty towards the slave labourers at the Bor concentration camp, and executed in 27 February 1947. Neither Radnóti's name nor the mass murder of Jewish prisoners near Abda, however, were mentioned in the voluminous prosecution file or during the trial. The other murderers' names remained unknown to the Hungarian people until 2006. There was a strictly confidential investigation conducted by the Ministry of Internal Affairs III during the communist era between 1967–1977, which identified four Royal Hungarian Army soldiers under of the command of Sgt. Tálas who were involved in the murder: Sándor Bodor, István Reszegi (or Reszegh; who both became long-time members in good standing of the ruling Hungarian Communist Party), as well as Sándor Kunos and János Malakuczi. No one else was ever indicted or prosecuted by the Communist single-party state. Sándor Kunos and János Malakuczi, however, who were not Party members, remained under covert surveillance by the Hungarian secret police (ÁVO).

== Poetry and literary career ==
=== Early work and the pastoral idyll ===
Before the outbreak of World War II, Radnóti's mature poetry was characterized by a strive for classical harmony, order, and purity. He often drew inspiration from ancient classical literature, particularly Virgil's pastorals. His work revolved around the pastoral idyll, the peaceful beauty of nature, and his love for his wife, Fanni Gyarmati. Radnóti deliberately utilized these classical and idyllic motifs as a humanistic counterweight to the rising fascism and political darkness in Europe during the 1930s. This firm grounding in the classical tradition became foundational for his later writing, during which the idyll transformed into a lost world and a symbol of spiritual survival.

=== Phonetic structure and quantitative verse ===
The Hungarian language possesses a unique phonetic structure where vowel length is strictly fixed and independent of stress. This makes Hungarian one of the few modern languages where ancient quantitative versification (metrical scanning based on syllable weight) can be employed completely naturally. This linguistic trait provided Radnóti with the artistic tools to achieve absolute formal perfection even amidst the most primitive conditions.

=== Premonition of fate ===
A dark premonition of his impending deportation and the terror of fascism is clearly evident in the first stanza of his poem Fragment (Töredék), written in May 1944, just a week before he was called up for his third and final forced labor service:

I lived on this earth in an age when

man fell so low he killed of his own will, for pleasure, not just on orders, and while his life was snared in wild obsessions,

he believed in false gods, lost in error.

— Miklós Radnóti, Fragment (translated by Emery George)

During World War II, Radnóti was severely affected by the Hungarian anti-Jewish laws due to his Jewish heritage. He was called up for forced labor (known as labor service, or munkaszolgálat) on three separate occasions.

=== The final poems and the Bor Notebook ===
The manuscript of "The Seventh Eclogue", handwritten by Miklós Radnóti in the Bor Notebook (Helikon facsimile edition, 1985).

In May 1944, he was deported to a German-controlled forced labor camp near Bor, Serbia, where he was subjected to harsh physical labor in the copper mines.

==== Death and legacy ====
As the Red Army approached in the autumn of 1944, the camp was evacuated, and the prisoners were forced onto a brutal death march on foot westward through Yugoslavia and Hungary. Completely exhausted physically, Radnóti was shot to death by Hungarian guards in November 1944 near the village of Abda in northwestern Hungary, where he was buried in a mass grave.

His final poems, which were later recovered from a notebook found in his coat pocket following the exhumation of the mass grave in Abda (known as the Bor Notebook [Bori notesz]), are considered some of the most significant works of modern Hungarian literature. Despite the constant threat of physical annihilation in the Bor labor camp and during the subsequent death march, Radnóti maintained a strict classical form in his poems, such as hexameters and eclogues.

In literary scholarship, this rigid formal discipline and control over meter and rhythm are viewed as the poet's conscious attempt to maintain human dignity, moral integrity, and spiritual resistance against the surrounding chaos and the destructiveness of fascism.

One of his most famous final works is The Seventh Eclogue (Hetedik ecloga). The poem was translated into Swedish by poets Tomas Tranströmer and Östen Sjöstrand, based on a literal translation and interpretation by Géza Thinsz, and was published in the anthology Sex ungerska poeter (1968).

In the poem, Radnóti portrays the brutal daily reality of the Lager Heidenau labor camp with almost documentary precision. The concrete situation in the barracks, where the guards had confiscated everything—including flashlights—forcing the poet to write in total darkness during the nights, is described in the poem with the words:

...feeling my way down the sheet, row after row, I write poems here in the dark.

— Miklós Radnóti, The Seventh Eclogue (translated by Emery George)

While the other prisoners slept and returned to their homes in their dreams—depicted as "home fly the prisoners now, the poor, the ragged, the shaved-heads, / flying from Serbia's blind peaks back to the heart of the homeland"—Radnóti remained awake as the only intellectually free voice. The poem culminates in a famous existential question regarding the survival of culture amidst barbarism:

Tell me, is there a home, where they still understand hexameters?

— Miklós Radnóti, The Seventh Eclogue (translated by Emery George)

== Bibliography (selection) ==
- Pogány köszöntő (Pagan Greeting), Kortárs, Budapest 1930.
- Újmódi pásztorok éneke (Songs of Modern Shepherds), Fiatal Magyarország, Budapest 1931.
- Lábadozó szél (Convalescent Wind), Fiatalok Művészeti Kollégiumának kiadása, Szeged 1933.
- Újhold (New Moon), Fiatalok Művészeti Kollégiumának kiadása, Szeged 1935.
- Járkálj csak, halálraítélt! (Just Walk Around, Condemned!), Nyugat Kiadása, Budapest 1936.
- Meredek út (Steep Road), Cserépfalvi, Budapest 1938.
- Naptár (Calendar), Hungária, Budapest 1942.
- Orpheus nyomában : műfordítások kétezer év költőiből (In the Footsteps of Orpheus: Translations of Poetry of Two Thousand Year Old Poets), Pharos, Budapest 1943.
- Tajtékos ég (Foamy Sky), Révai, Budapest 1946.
- Radnóti Miklós művei (Works of Miklós Radnóti), Szépirodalmi Könyvkiadó, Budapest 1978, ISBN 963-15-1182-0, biography by Pál Réz
- Miklós Radnóti, The Complete Poetry in Hungarian and English, McFarland & Company, Jefferson 2014, ISBN 978-0-78646953-6

Miklós Radnóti was Hungarian translator of works by Jean de La Fontaine and Guillaume Apollinaire. His works were translated into English by Edward G. Emery and Frederick Turner, into Serbo-Croatian by Danilo Kiš, into German by Franz Fühmann and into French by Jean-Luc Moreau.

== Reviews ==
- Findlay, Bill (1980), review of Forced March, in Cencrastus No. 2, Spring 1980, pp. 45 & 46, ISSN 0264-0856

== Image Gallery ==
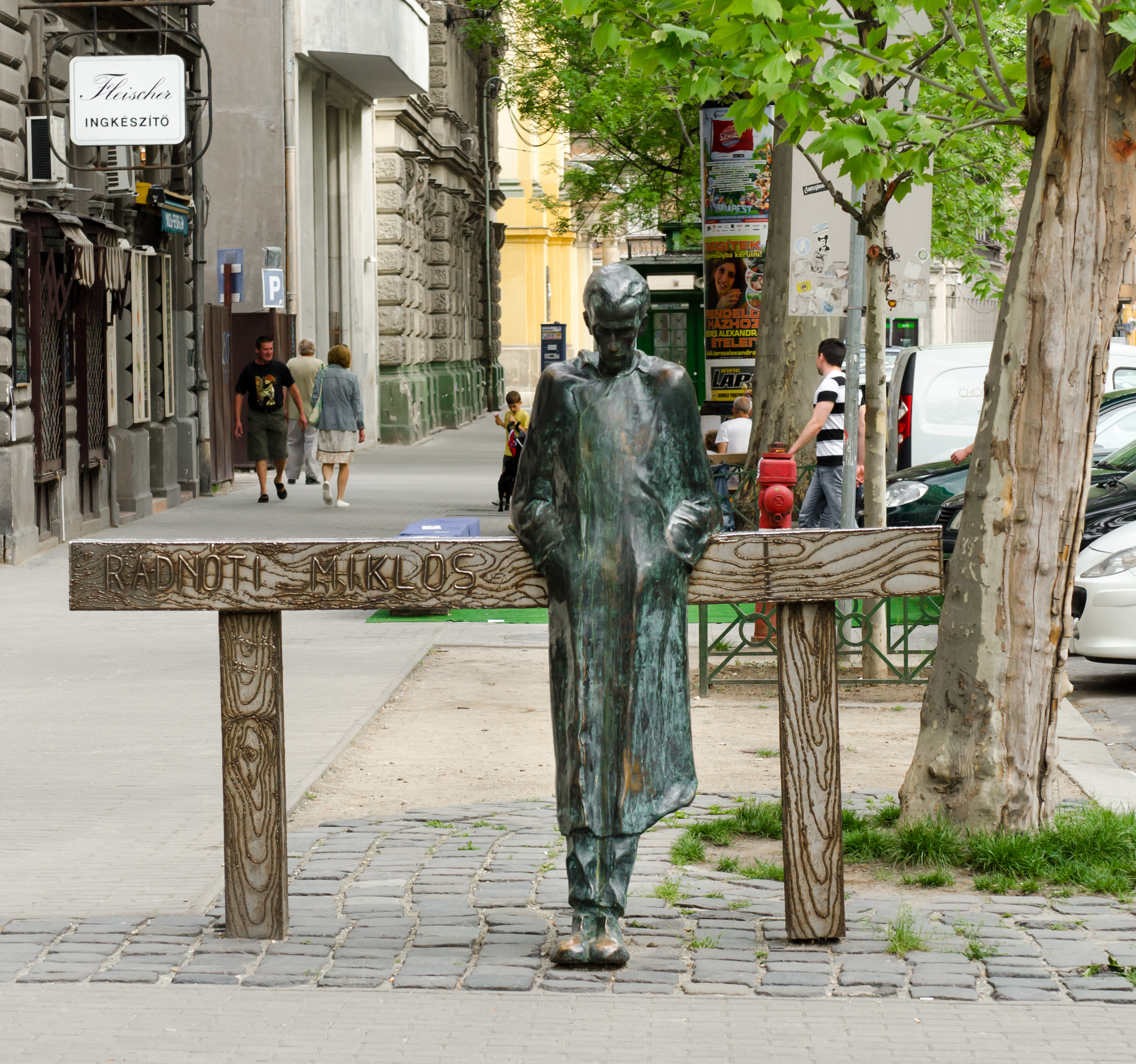
Statue in Budapest by Imre Varga

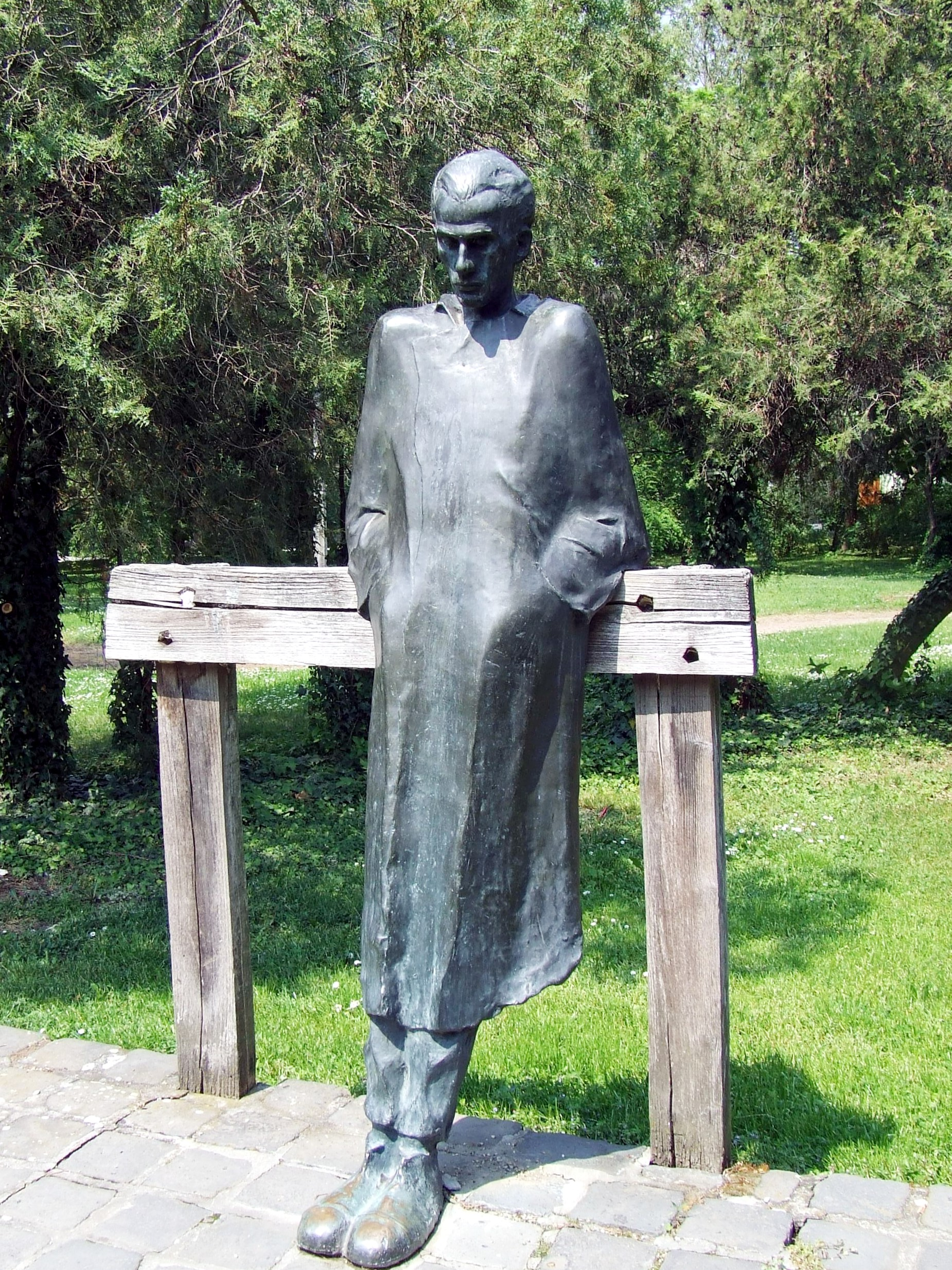
Statue in Mohács by Imre Varga

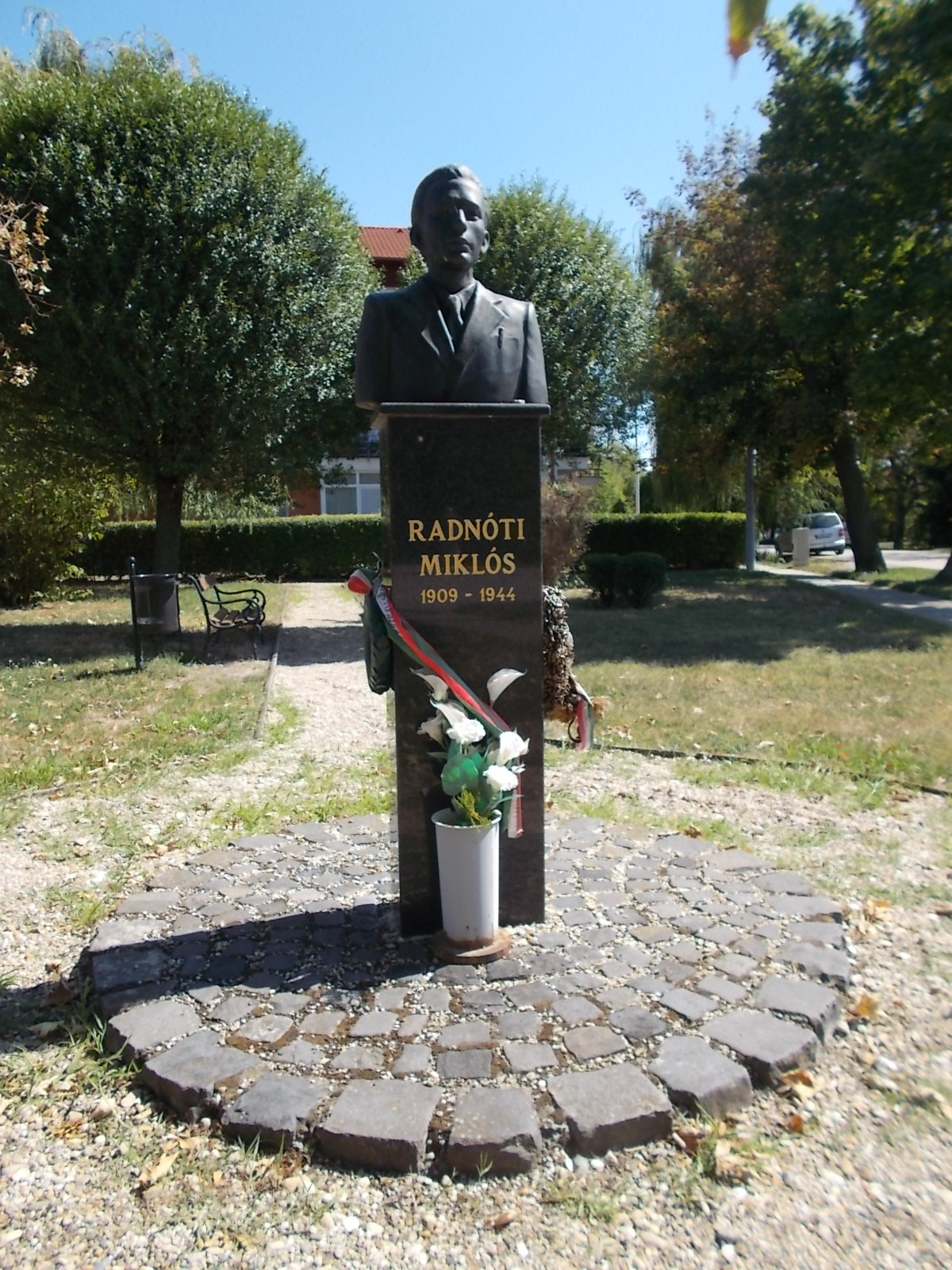
Bust in Mosonmagyaróvár

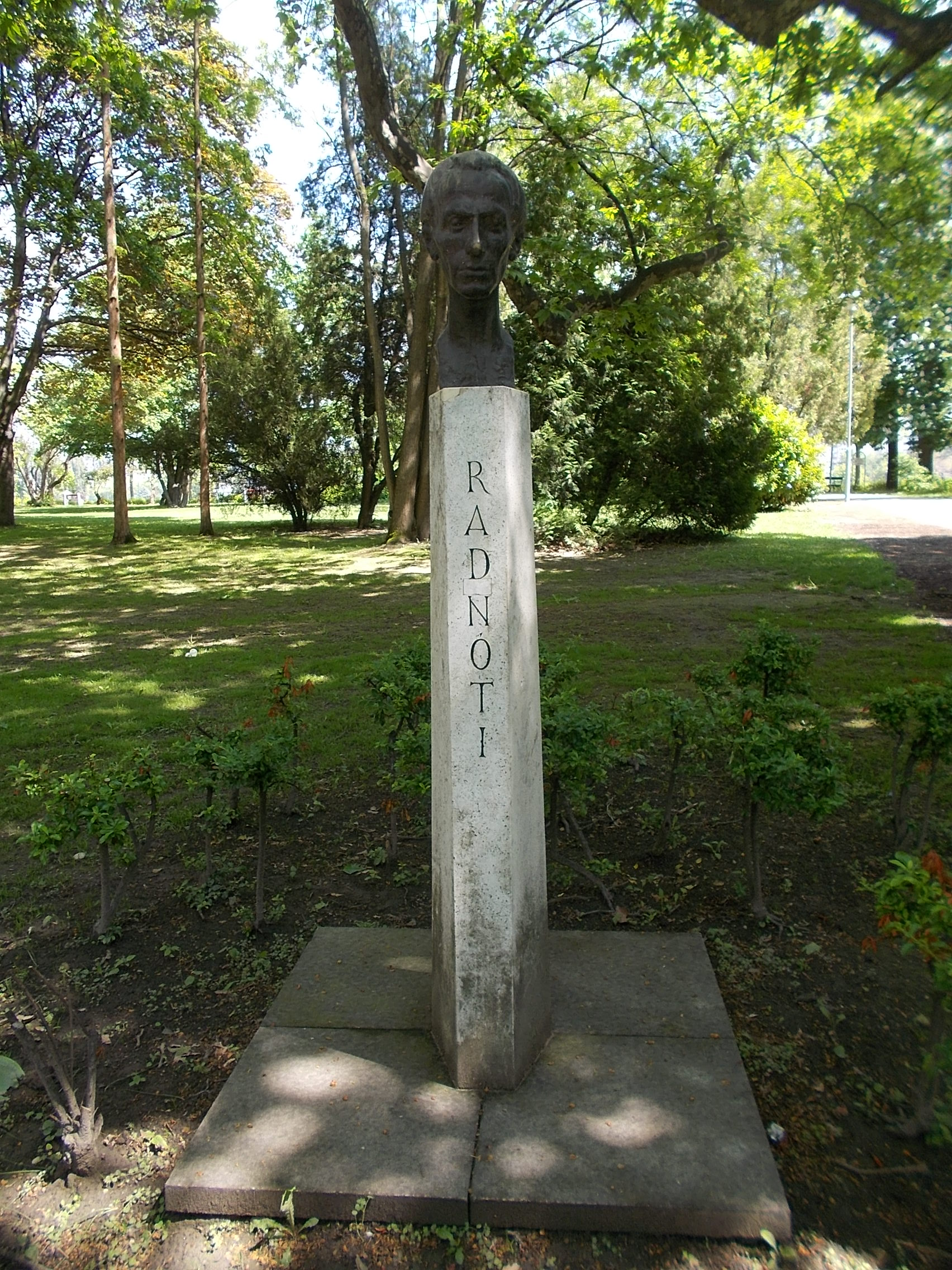
Bust on Margaret Island

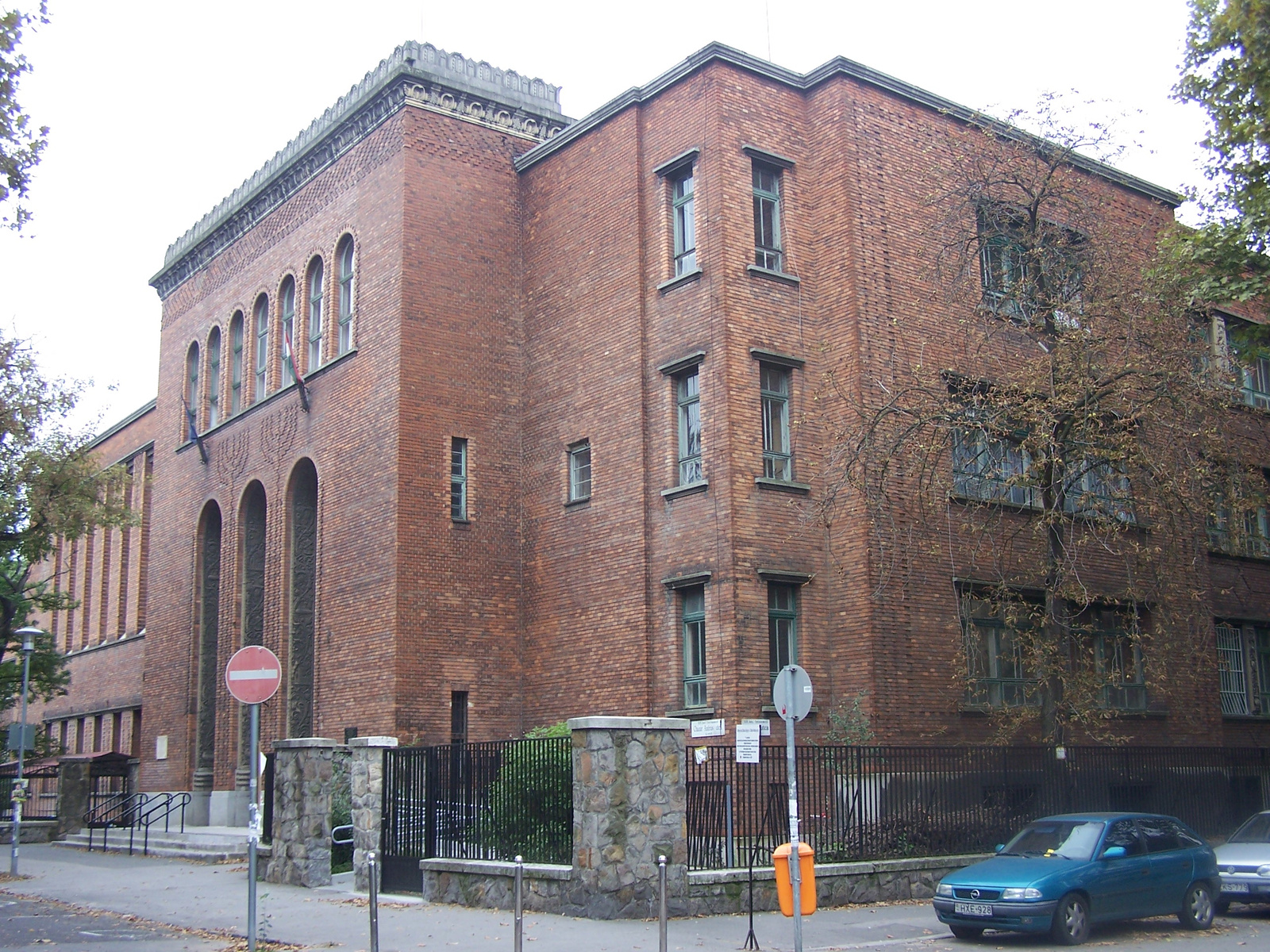
Miklós Radnóti—ELTE School in Budapest—Zugló

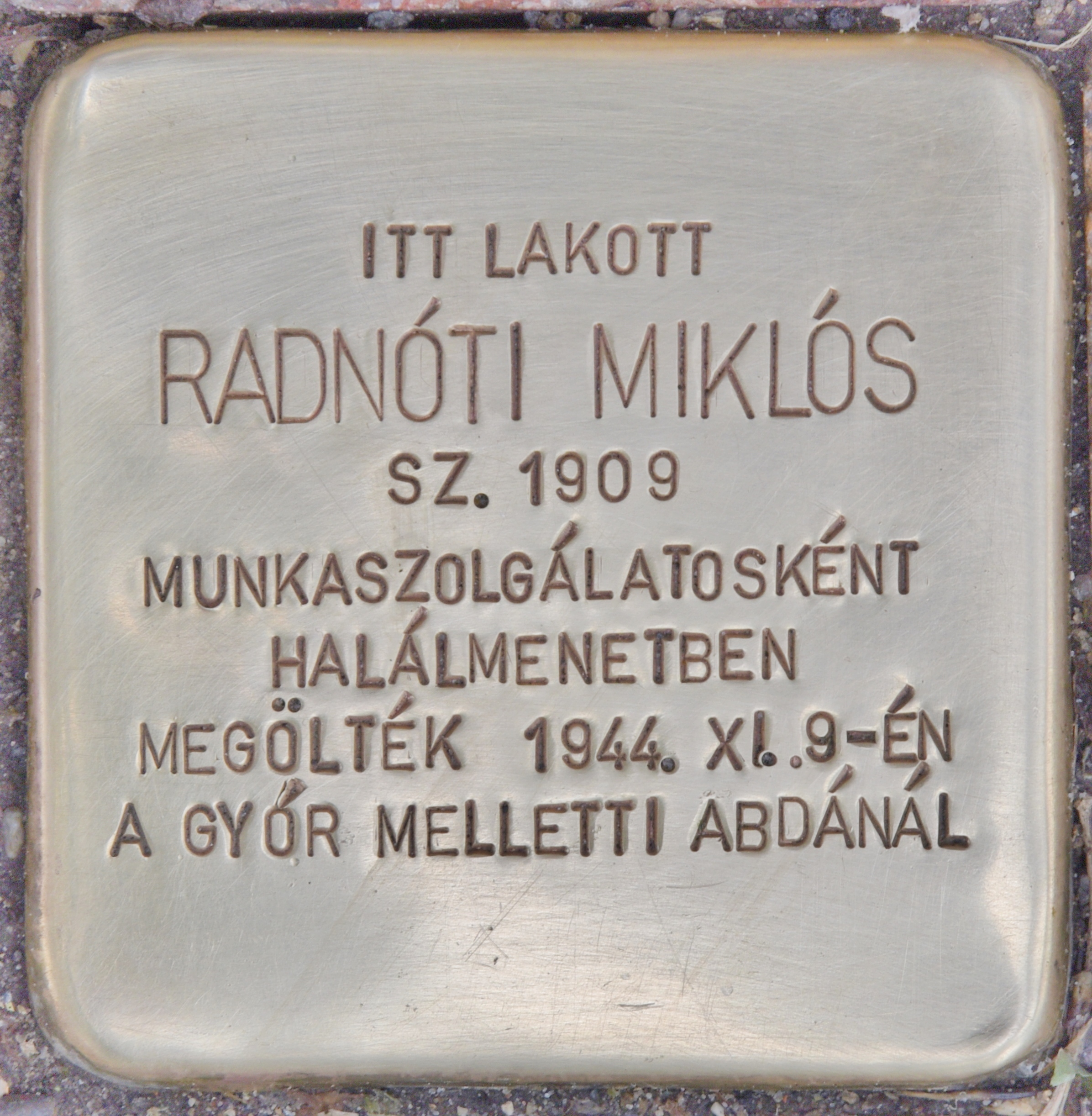
Stolperstein in Budapest

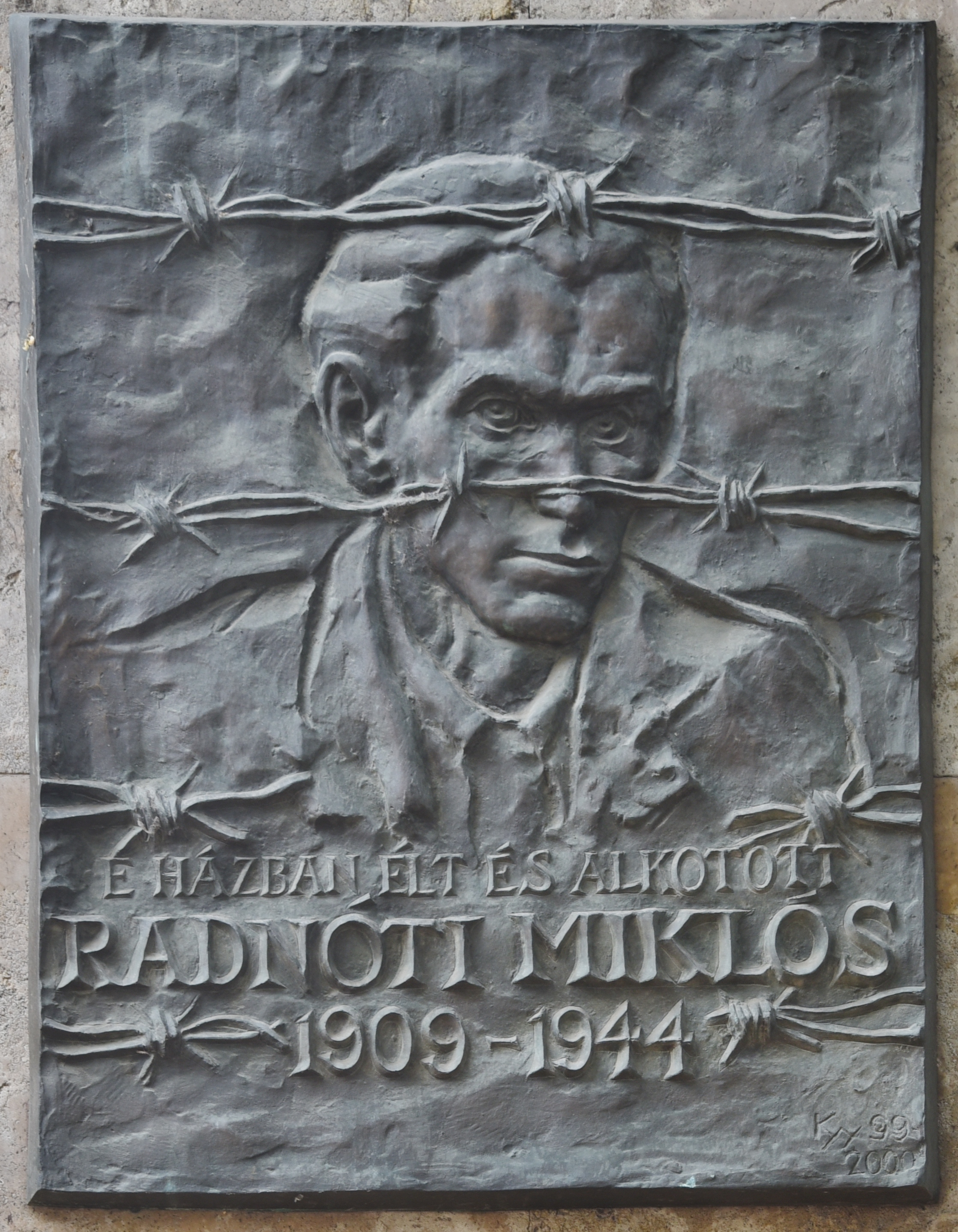
Memorial plaque

== Articles ==
- History of the Jews in Hungary
- Hungary during World War II
- The Holocaust
