= János Radványi =

Hungarian politician, diplomat (1922–2016)

Hungarian Ambassador to the United States
- In office 14 February 1962 – 17 May 1967
- Preceded by: Tibor Zádor
- Succeeded by: Sándor Józan

Personal details
- Born: 4 August 1922 Budapest, Kingdom of Hungary
- Died: 11 January 2016 (aged 93) United States
- Profession: academic professor

János Radványi (4 August 1922 – 11 January 2016) was a Hungarian-born American diplomat, politician, political scientist and academic professor, who served as Hungarian Ambassador to the United States between 1962 and 1967, when he applied for asylum.

== Biography ==
János Radványi was born in Budapest in 1922. He fought the Germans in the partisan underground until the Second World War ended. He entered diplomatic service in 1947 and was posted in Turkey, France, Switzerland, and Syria. He was appointed to head the Hungarian Embassy in Washington, D.C. in 1962. Five years later for political reasons, Ambassador Radványi cut his ties with the Hungarian government and issued a statement that said in part: "I have always tried to work for peace and better understanding in this troubled world. However, in recent months I came to realize that it was impossible for me to act in good conscience and continue to be the representative of the Hungarian Government to the American Government." For his defection, Radványi was convicted and sentenced to death in absentia by a Hungarian court.

Dean Rusk, the US Secretary of State, reported that Hungarian Foreign Minister János Péter had attempted to defraud the United States by pretending to be in contact with the government of North Vietnam. Rusk engaged in what he at the time believed to be serious negotiations to end the war in Vietnam. However, Radványi, after his defection, later informed Rusk "that Péter was not in an effective contact with Hanoi, and that they had had no encouragement from Hanoi about the things that Péter was saying to me." Rusk came to believe that the Péter overture "was an instance that was just a plain fraud."

After being granted political asylum, he and his family moved to California. He earned a doctorate in History at Stanford University in 1971. Shortly thereafter, he joined the faculty of the History Department at Mississippi State University. In 1982, he founded and directed the Center for International Security and Strategic Studies. In June 1996, Radványi became the first chair holder of the newly established Endowed Chair for International Security and Strategic Studies at Mississippi State University.

In 1978, Radványi and his family were granted American citizenship. He died on 11 January 2016.

== Books ==
- Radványi, János: Hungary and the Superpowers. Hoover Institution Press, Stanford, 1972.
- Radványi, János: Delusion and Reality: Gambits, Hoaxes and Diplomatic One-Upmanship in Vietnam. Gateway Editions, Ltd., Southbend, Indiana, 1978.
- Radványi, János (ed.): Psychological Operations and Political Warfare in Long-Term Strategic Planning. Praeger Publishers, New York, 1990.
- Radványi, János (ed.): The Pacific in the 1990s: Economic and Strategic Change. University Press of America, Bethesda, Maryland, 1990.
- Radványi, János: The Survey Reports on Japan-Related Regional Activities in the U.S.. Mississippi-Japan Center for International Exchange Press, March, 1993.

Diplomatic posts
Preceded by Károly Bonyhádi	Hungarian Consul General to Syria; 1957–1958	Succeeded by Pál Mányik
Preceded by Tibor Zádor	Hungarian Ambassador to the United States; 1962–1967	Succeeded by Sándor Józan
