= Ferenc Esztergályos =

Hungarian politician, diplomat (1927–2002)

Hungarian Ambassador to the United States
- In office 8 April 1975 – 2 September 1981
- Preceded by: Károly Kovács
- Succeeded by: János Petrán

Personal details
- Born: 4 March 1927 Szeged, Kingdom of Hungary
- Died: 31 July 2002 (aged 75) Budapest, Hungary
- Party: MSZMP
- Profession: politician

Ferenc Esztergályos (4 March 1927 – 31 July 2002) was a Hungarian diplomat, who served as Hungarian Ambassador to the United States between 1975 and 1981.

== Career ==
After finishing secondary studies, he was involved in the Hungarian Democratic Youth League (Madisz) in his birthplace between 1946 and 1947. Following that he joined police and soon became a member of the State Protection Authority (ÁVH). From 1950 to 1952, his dismissal, he served as Head of the ÁVH's Intelligence Department. He functioned as Deputy Secretary-General of the World Federation of Hungarians (MVSZ) between 1952 and 1956.

Following the crushing of the Hungarian Revolution of 1956, he was employed at the Hungarian Embassy in Vienna, where he was appointed Head of the Repatriation Committee (1957–1960). Returning home, he became Deputy Head of the Ministry of Foreign Affairs' 2nd Territorial Department (1960–1963). He served as Envoy, then Ambassador to Sweden from 1963 to 1969, also accredited to Iceland (1963–1969) and Norway (1963–1967). He functioned as Head of the ministry's 6th Territorial (Scandinavian area) Department between 1969 and 1973.

Esztergályos was the head of the Hungarian contingent of the International Commission of Control and Supervision (ICCS) during the Vietnam War for a short time in 1973. He was again Head of the ministry's 6th Territorial Department between 1973 and 1975. He served as Ambassador to the United States between 1975 and 1981. For the third time, he was Head of the ministry's 6th Territorial Department between 1981 and 1984. He functioned as Deputy Minister of Foreign Affairs from 1984 to 1986. He was Permanent Representative of Hungary to the United Nations between 1986 and 1990. He retired on 31 October 1990.

== Sources ==
- Baráth, Magdolna; Gecsényi, Lajos, eds. (2015). Főkonzulok, követek és nagykövetek 1945–1990 [Consuls General, Envoys, Ambassadors 1945–1990] (in Hungarian). MTA Bölcsészettudományi Kutatóközpont. ISBN 978-963-416-007-6.

Diplomatic posts
Preceded by Pál Korbacsics	Hungarian Ambassador to Sweden; 1963–1969	Succeeded by Béla Nagy
Preceded by Károly Kovács	Hungarian Ambassador to the United States; 1975–1981	Succeeded by János Petrán
Preceded by Pál Rácz	Permanent Representative of Hungary to the United Nations; 1986–1990	Succeeded by André Erdős
