= Vencel Házi =

Hungarian politician (1925–2007)

Hungarian Ambassador to the United States
- In office 2 August 1983 – 24 May 1989
- Preceded by: János Petrán
- Succeeded by: Péter Várkonyi

Personal details
- Born: 3 September 1925 Okány, Kingdom of Hungary
- Died: 22 January 2007 (aged 81) Budapest, Hungary
- Party: MSZMP
- Profession: politician

Vencel Házi (3 September 1925 – 22 January 2007) was a Hungarian diplomat and economist, who served as Hungarian Ambassador to Greece (accredited to Cyprus) 1960 to 1964 to the United Kingdom from 1970 to 1976 and as Hungarian Ambassador to the United States between 1983 and 1989. He also served as Deputy Minister of Foreign Affairs twice (1968–1970 and 1976–1983).

== Sources ==
- Baráth, Magdolna; Gecsényi, Lajos, eds. (2015). Főkonzulok, követek és nagykövetek 1945–1990 [Consuls General, Envoys, Ambassadors 1945–1990] (in Hungarian). MTA Bölcsészettudományi Kutatóközpont. ISBN 978-963-416-007-6.

Diplomatic posts
Preceded by First	Hungarian Ambassador to Iraq; 1958–1961	Succeeded by Károly Ráth
Preceded by Károly Ráth	Hungarian Ambassador to Greece; 1961–1964	Succeeded by Imre Hollai
Preceded by György Varsányi	Hungarian Ambassador to the United Kingdom; 1970–1976	Succeeded by János N. Lőrincz
Preceded by János Petrán	Hungarian Ambassador to the United States; 1983–1989	Succeeded by Péter Várkonyi
