= János Nagy (diplomat) =

Hungarian diplomat and politician (born 1928)

Hungarian Ambassador to the United States
- In office 22 August 1968 – 4 June 1971
- Preceded by: Sándor Józan
- Succeeded by: Péter Fülöp

Personal details
- Born: 23 September 1928 Újcsanálos, Hungary
- Party: MSZMP
- Profession: Politician

János Nagy (born 23 September 1928) is a Hungarian former diplomat and politician, who served as Hungarian Ambassador to the United States between 1968 and 1971.

Nagy entered foreign service in 1948. He was appointed Envoy to Indonesia in March 1957, at the age of 28. The external relations between Hungary and Indonesia were extended to embassy level in September 1959. Nagy served in this capacity until October 1960. From 1963 to 1967, he was Hungarian Ambassador to India in New Delhi, also accredited to Burma, Nepal, Ceylon and Cambodia. Returning from Washington, D.C. in 1971, he served as Deputy Minister of Foreign Affairs (1971–1980) under ministers János Péter and Frigyes Puja, then as Secretary of State from 1980 to 1985.

Between 1985 and 1990, he was Hungarian Ambassador to Austria, also accredited to international organizations and the International Atomic Energy Agency (IAEA), based in Vienna. He retired on 31 August 1990.

== Sources ==
- Baráth, Magdolna; Gecsényi, Lajos, eds. (2015). Főkonzulok, követek és nagykövetek 1945–1990 [Consuls General, Envoys, Ambassadors 1945–1990] (in Hungarian). MTA Bölcsészettudományi Kutatóközpont. ISBN 978-963-416-007-6.

Diplomatic posts
| Preceded by Péter Kós | Hungarian Ambassador to Indonesia; 1957–1960 | Succeeded by József Száll |
| Preceded by László Réczei | Hungarian Ambassador to India; 1963–1967 | Succeeded by Péter Kós |
| Preceded by Sándor Józan | Hungarian Ambassador to the United States; 1968–1971 | Succeeded by Péter Fülöp |
| Preceded by Jenő Randé | Hungarian Ambassador to Austria; 1985–1990 | Succeeded by Dénes Hunkár |
