= Tibor Zádor =

Hungarian diplomat

Hungarian Charge d'Affaires ad interim to the United States
- In office 19 January 1957 – 14 February 1962
- Preceded by: Péter Kós
- Succeeded by: János Radványi

Tibor Zádor was a Hungarian diplomat, who served as Hungarian Charge d'Affaires ad interim to the United States following the Hungarian Revolution of 1956, when the Cabinet of the United States did not recognise the Kádár government which was installed after the Soviet invasion of Hungary.

Zádor's main task was to restore and normalize the frozen relationship between the two countries. He enjoyed a high degree of autonomy during these years.

== Sources ==
- Baráth, Magdolna; Gecsényi, Lajos, eds. (2015). Főkonzulok, követek és nagykövetek 1945–1990 [Consuls General, Envoys, Ambassadors 1945–1990] (in Hungarian). MTA Bölcsészettudományi Kutatóközpont. ISBN 978-963-416-007-6.

Diplomatic posts
Preceded by Péter Kós	Hungarian Charge d'Affaires ad interim to the United States; 1957–1962	Succeeded by János Radványi
