= Miklós Lorsi =

Jewish Hungarian violinist

Miklós Lorsi (died October 1944) was a Jewish Hungarian violinist who was murdered during the Holocaust. The manner of his murder, and allusion to his art as a violinist formed the line "already taut, a string about to snap" in the last poem of Miklós Radnóti.

During October 1944 Lorsi was part of a 3,200 person death march. At one point during the march the SS ordered everyone to lie down, and then began shooting randomly. Lorsi was shot, and when they were ordered to continue marching, Lorsi was bleeding and having difficulty walking. While he was being helped along by his friend Miklós Radnóti, an SS officer shot Lorsi in the back of the neck, killing him. The poem touches on the violinist's art and compares his death to the death of his violin. Radnóti himself was murdered shortly afterwards.
