= Károly Szabó (Ambassador to the United States) =

Hungarian Ambassador to the United States
- In office 4 June 1971 – 8 April 1975
- Preceded by: Péter Fülöp
- Succeeded by: Károly Kovács

Personal details
- Born: 5 July 1928 Diósgyőr, Hungary
- Died: 25 July 1995 (aged 67) Budapest, Hungary
- Profession: politician

Károly Szabó (5 July 1928 – 25 July 1995) was a Hungarian diplomat, who served as Hungarian Ambassador to the United States between 1971 and 1975.

Prior to that, he was also Ambassador to Tanzania from 1967 to 1969, also accredited to Somalia and Zambia. From 1979 to 1984, he functioned as Ambassador to Mexico, also accredited to Costa Rica, Honduras, Panama, Jamaica, Trinidad and Tobago and Barbados. From 1984 to 1986, he was head of 8th Regional Department (Sub-Saharan Africa) of the Hungarian Foreign Service. He retired on 30 June 1986.

== Sources ==
- Baráth, Magdolna; Gecsényi, Lajos, eds. (2015). Főkonzulok, követek és nagykövetek 1945–1990 [Consuls General, Envoys, Ambassadors 1945–1990] (in Hungarian). MTA Bölcsészettudományi Kutatóközpont. ISBN 978-963-416-007-6.

Diplomatic posts
Preceded by János Katona	Hungarian Ambassador to Tanzania; 1967–1969	Succeeded by Miklós Bárd
Preceded by Péter Fülöp	Hungarian Ambassador to the United States; 1971–1975	Succeeded by Károly Kovács
Preceded by Zsiva Peják	Hungarian Ambassador to Mexico; 1979–1984	Succeeded by János Tóth
