= Péter Fülöp =

Hungarian diplomat (1914–2004)

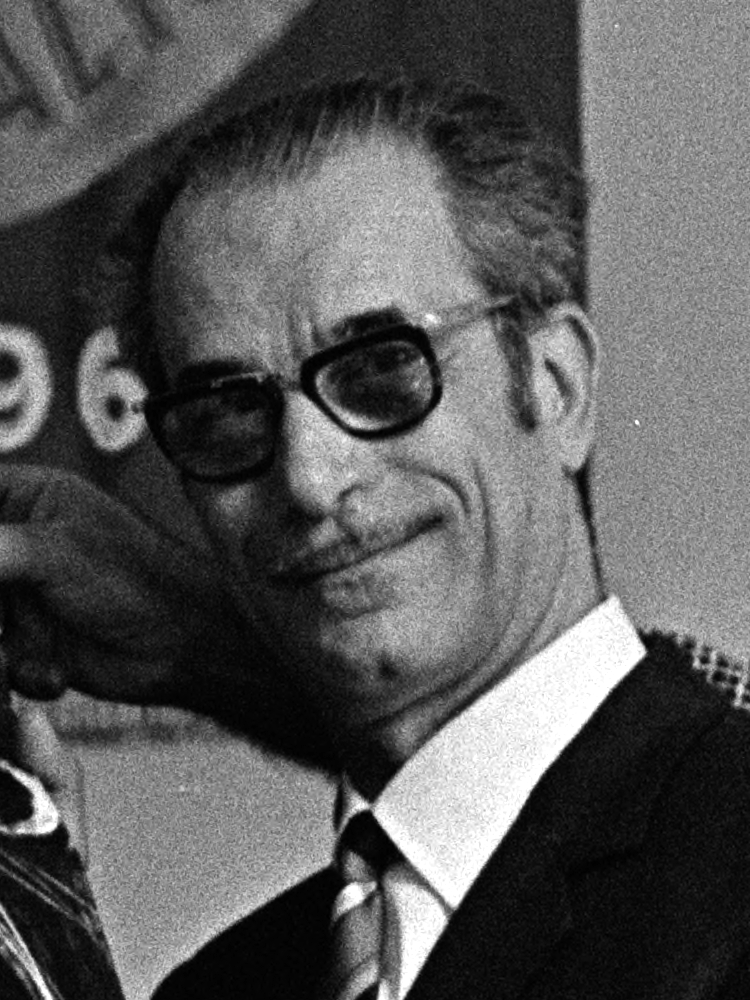
- Fülöp in 1972

Hungarian Charge d'Affaires ad interim to the United States
- In office 9 June 1971 – 21 September 1971
- Preceded by: János Nagy
- Succeeded by: Károly Szabó

Personal details
- Born: 24 March 1914 Budapest, Austria-Hungary
- Died: 15 September 2004 (aged 90) Budapest, Hungary
- Political party: MKP, MDP, MSZMP
- Profession: Politician

Péter Fülöp (24 March 1914 – 15 September 2004) was a Hungarian diplomat, who served as Hungarian Charge d'Affaires ad interim to the United States in 1971. He was the Consul General of the Hungarian Embassy in New York City from 1974 to 1976. He was the Ambassador to Norway from 1979 to 1983.

== Sources ==
- Baráth, Magdolna; Gecsényi, Lajos, eds. (2015). Főkonzulok, követek és nagykövetek 1945–1990 [Consuls General, Envoys, Ambassadors 1945–1990] (in Hungarian). MTA Bölcsészettudományi Kutatóközpont. ISBN 978-963-416-007-6.

Diplomatic posts
Preceded by János Nagy	Hungarian Charge d'Affaires ad interim to the United States; 1971	Succeeded by Károly Szabó
Preceded by József Kárpáti	Hungarian Ambassador to Norway; 1979–1983	Succeeded by Gábor Sebestyén
