= János Petrán =

Hungarian diplomat, politician (born 1934)

Hungarian Ambassador to the United States
- In office 2 September 1981 – 2 August 1983
- Preceded by: Ferenc Esztergályos
- Succeeded by: Vencel Házi

Personal details
- Born: 28 August 1934 (age 92) Oroszlány, Hungary
- Party: MSZMP
- Profession: politician

János Petrán (born 28 August 1934) is a former Hungarian diplomat and security agent, who served as Hungarian Ambassador to the United States between 1981 and 1983. After that he represented Hungary at the international organizations based in Vienna from 1983 to 1985.

== Sources ==
- Baráth, Magdolna; Gecsényi, Lajos, eds. (2015). Főkonzulok, követek és nagykövetek 1945–1990 [Consuls General, Envoys, Ambassadors 1945–1990] (in Hungarian). MTA Bölcsészettudományi Kutatóközpont. ISBN 978-963-416-007-6.

Diplomatic posts
| Preceded by Ferenc Esztergályos | Hungarian Ambassador to the United States; 1981–1983 | Succeeded by Vencel Házi |
