= Péter Várkonyi =

Hungarian politician (1931–2008)

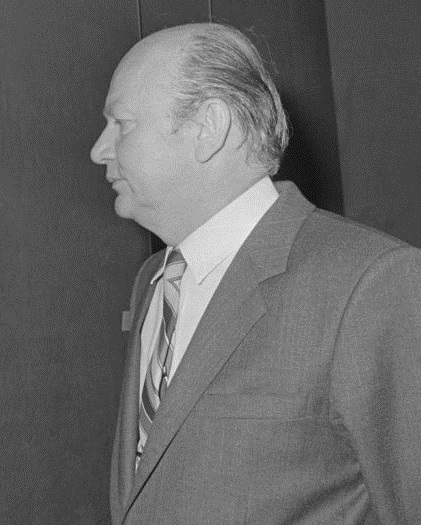

Minister of Foreign Affairs of Hungary
- In office 8 July 1983 – 10 May 1989
- Prime Minister: György Lázár; Károly Grósz; Miklós Németh
- Preceded by: Frigyes Puja
- Succeeded by: Gyula Horn

Personal details
- Born: 3 April 1931 Budapest, Kingdom of Hungary
- Died: 14 October 2008 (aged 77) Budapest, Hungary
- Party: MSZMP
- Spouse: Julianna Kozák
- Children: Péter and another son
- Parent(s): Várkonyi Péter; Badál Ilona
- Profession: politician

Péter Várkonyi (3 April 1931 – 14 October 2008) was a Hungarian politician, who served as Minister of Foreign Affairs between 1983 and 1989. After that he was the ambassador to the United States until 1990.

Political offices
Preceded by Frigyes Puja	Minister of Foreign Affairs; 1983–1989	Succeeded by Gyula Horn
Diplomatic posts
Preceded by Vencel Házi	Hungarian Ambassador to the United States; 1989–1990	Succeeded by Péter Zwack
