= János Nagy =

János Nagy may refer to:

- János Nagy (diplomat) (born 1928), Hungarian diplomat and politician
- János Nagy (footballer) (born 1992), Hungarian footballer
- János Nagy (wrestler) (born 1964), Hungarian wrestler
- János Nagy (boxer) (born 1975), Hungarian boxer
