= Sándor Józan =

Hungarian politician, diplomat (1932–1985)

Hungarian Charge d'Affaires ad interim to the United States
- In office 22 May 1967 – 10 September 1968
- Preceded by: János Radványi
- Succeeded by: János Nagy

Personal details
- Born: 4 August 1932 Tinnye, Kingdom of Hungary
- Died: 13 May 1985 (aged 52)
- Party: MSZMP

Sándor Józan (4 August 1932 – 13 May 1985) was a Hungarian state security officer and diplomat, who served as Hungarian Charge d'Affaires ad interim to the United States between 1967 and 1968, after his predecessor, János Radványi applied for asylum from the US government.

Diplomatic posts
Preceded by János Radványi	Hungarian Charge d'Affaires ad interim to the United States; 1967–1968	Succeeded by János Nagy
