= Endre Sík =

Hungarian historian and politician

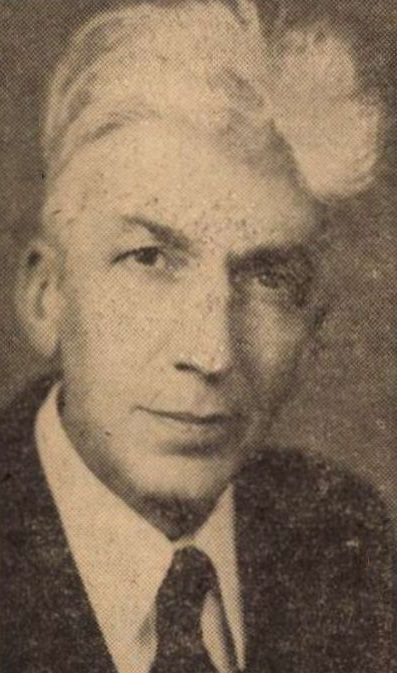

Minister of Foreign Affairs of Hungary
- In office 15 February 1958 – 13 September 1961
- Prime Minister: Ferenc Münnich
- Preceded by: Imre Horváth
- Succeeded by: János Péter

Personal details
- Born: 2 April 1891 Budapest, Austria-Hungary
- Died: 10 April 1978 (aged 87) Budapest, Hungarian People's Republic
- Party: MKP, MDP, MSZMP
- Children: Igor
- Relatives: Sándor Sík (brother)
- Profession: politician, jurist, historian, writer

Endre Sík (2 April 1891 – 10 April 1978) was a Hungarian historian, politician, Minister of Foreign Affairs between 1958 and 1961. He was the younger brother of the priest Sándor Sík who was also a poet and piarist teacher.

During the First World War he was captured by the Russians. After that he lived in the Soviet Union. In 1920, he joined the Soviet Communist Party. In 1945, he returned to Hungary, and became a communist politician. He was deputy of the Minister of Foreign Affairs (1954–1958), then minister (1958–1961).

In his scientific work, he studied the history of African ethnic groups. He obtained the Doctor of Sciences degree of the Hungarian Academy of Sciences in 1962.

His book, Vihar a levelet, containing his recollections on the Soviet Union in the 1930s, was banned and withdrawn immediately after appearance.

== Works ==
- Fekete Afrika története I–IV (The history of Black Africa), Akadémiai Kiadó, Budapest, 1961–1973.
  - in English: Vol. I, Vol. II, Vol. III, Vol. IV
- Vihar a levelet, Zrínyi Könyvkiadó, Budapest, 1970.

Political offices
Preceded by Imre Horváth	Minister of Foreign Affairs; 1958–1961	Succeeded by János Péter
