= Radnovce =

Municipality of Slovakia

Radnovce Nemesradnót
- Municipality
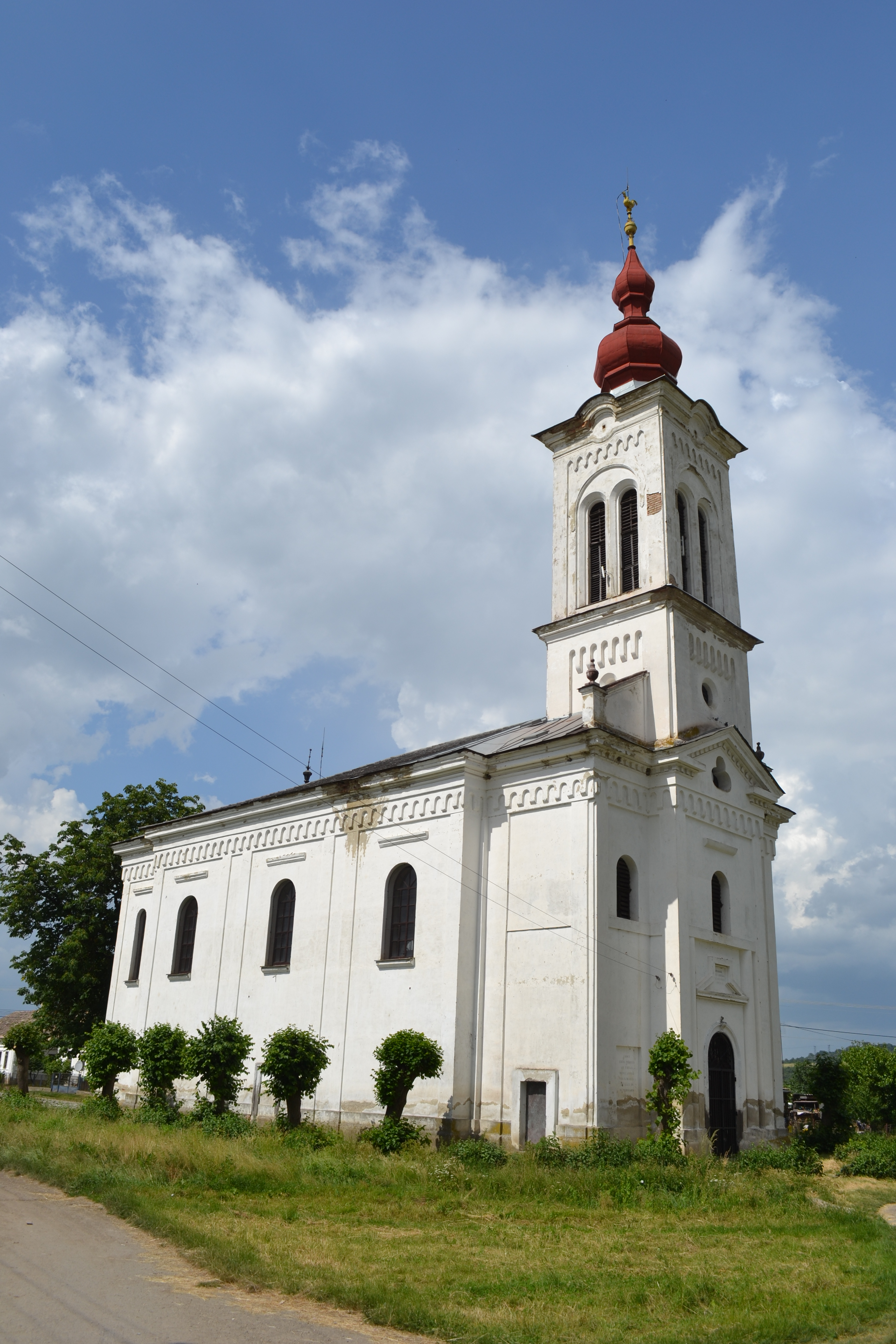
- Calvinist church

- Flag

- Location of Radnovce in the Banská Bystrica Region Location of Radnovce in Slovakia
- Coordinates: 48.35°N 20.22°E
- Country: Slovakia
- Region: Banská Bystrica Region
- District: Rimavská Sobota District
- First mentioned: 1332

Area
  - Total: 8.32 km^{2} (3.21 sq mi)
- Elevation: 173 m (568 ft)

Population (2025)
  - Total: 1,034
- Time zone: UTC+1 (CET)
  - Summer (DST): UTC+2 (CEST)
- Postal code: 980 42
- Area code: +421 47
- Vehicle registration plate (until 2022): RS
- Website: radnovce.sk

Radnovce (Hungarian: Nemesradnót) is a village and municipality in the Rimavská Sobota District of the Banská Bystrica Region of southern Slovakia. According to 2021 census, only 2.5% of inhabitants belong to the Slovak ethnic group, outnumbered by Hungarians (60.7%) and Romani (33.8%).

The vast majority of the municipality's population consists of the local Roma community. In 2019, they constituted an estimated 95% of the local population.

== Geography ==
The municipality lies at an altitude of 173 metres (568 ft) and covers an area of 8.32 km^{2} (3.21 sq mi) (2025).

== Population ==
Population statistic (10 years)
Year	1995	2005	2015	2025
Count	610	705	896	1034
Difference		+15.57%	+27.09%	+15.40%

Population statistic
Year	2024	2025
Count	1020	1034
Difference		+1.37%

It has a population of 1034 people (31 December 2025).

=== Ethnicity ===
Census 2021 (1+ %)
Ethnicity	Number	Fraction
Hungarian	894	90.3%
Romani	817	82.52%
Not found out	69	6.96%
Slovak	39	3.93%
Total	990	

In year 2021 was 990 people by ethnicity 894 as Hungarian, 817 as Romani, 69 as Not found out and 39 as Slovak.

Note on population: The difference values of population numbers in the table "Population statistic" and in the sections "Ethnicity" & "Religion" is caused by the use of various statistical methods.

=== Religion ===
Census 2021 (1+ %)
Religion	Number	Fraction
Roman Catholic Church	438	44.24%
None	276	27.88%
Calvinist Church	198	20%
Jehovah's Witnesses	33	3.33%
Not found out	33	3.33%
Total	990	

In year 2021 was 990 people by religion 438 from Roman Catholic Church, 276 from None, 198 from Calvinist Church, 33 from Jehovah's Witnesses, 33 from Not found out, 9 from Evangelical Church, 1 from Christian Congregations in Slovakia, 1 from Other and 1 from Greek Catholic Church.
