= Frigyes Puja =

Hungarian politician (1921–2008)

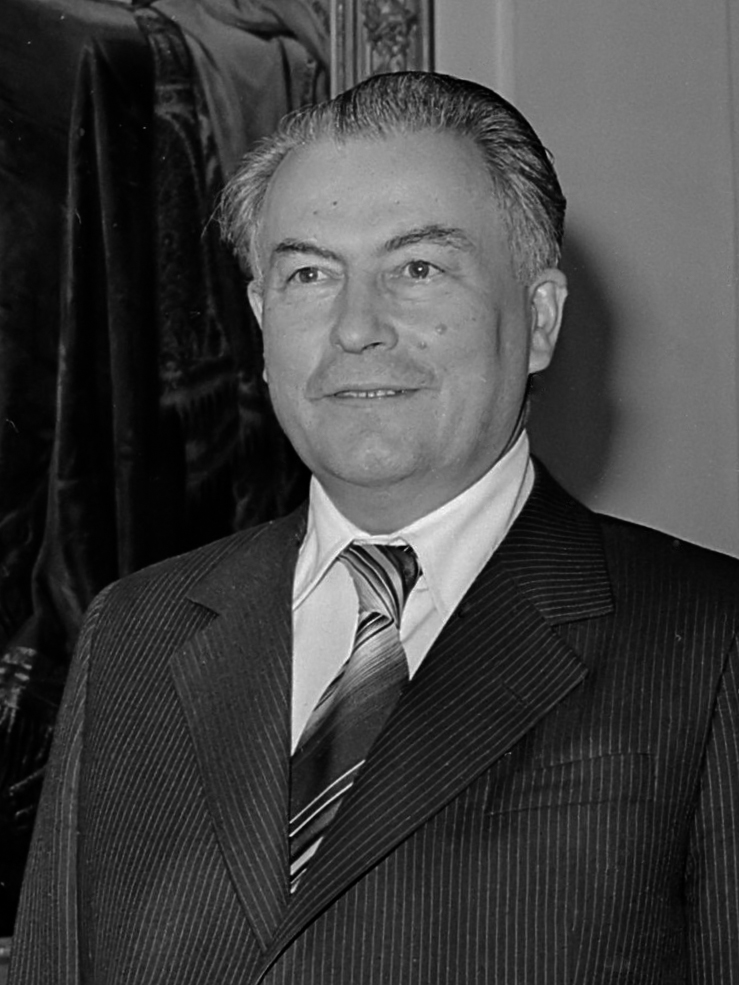

Minister of Foreign Affairs of Hungary
- In office 14 December 1973 – 8 July 1983
- Prime Minister: Jenő Fock; György Lázár
- Preceded by: János Péter
- Succeeded by: Péter Várkonyi

Personal details
- Born: 2 February 1921 Battonya, Kingdom of Hungary
- Died: 5 July 2008 (aged 87) Budapest, Hungary
- Party: MKP, MDP, MSZMP
- Profession: politician

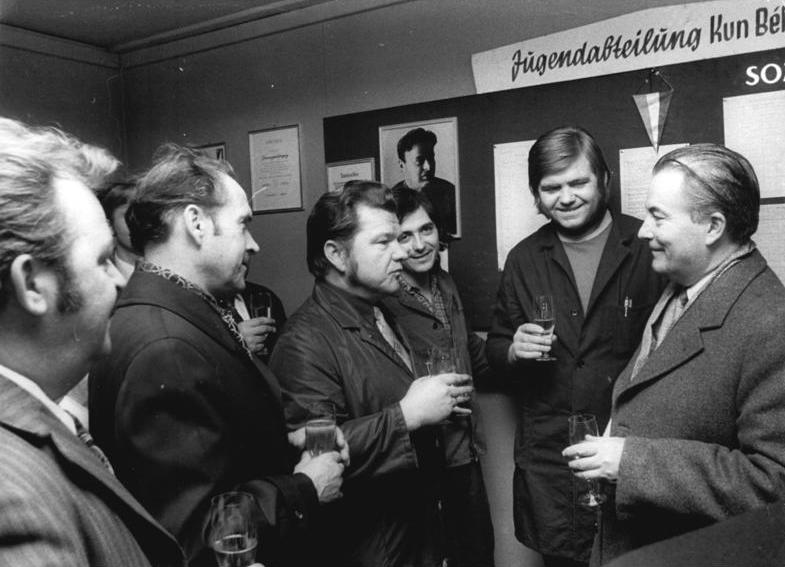
Frigyes Puja (right side) during an occasion of visit to East Germany.

Frigyes Puja (2 February 1921 – 5 July 2008) was a Hungarian politician, who served as Minister of Foreign Affairs between 1973 and 1983.

He worked as a typographer from 1934 until the end of the Second World War. Then he entered to the Hungarian Communist Party. He was the Hungarian ambassador to Sweden between 1953 and 1955. After that he represented Hungary in Norway, Denmark and Austria. Between 1959 and 1963 he served as deputy Minister of Foreign Affairs.

After that he was the party's (then already MSZMP) Central Committee's head of the Department of Foreign Affairs. In 1973 he was appointed minister. From 1983 he served as ambassador to Finland. He had many publications about the Hungarian foreign policy. In 1988 Puja published his biography.

Political offices
Preceded by János Péter	Minister of Foreign Affairs; 1973–1983	Succeeded by Péter Várkonyi
