= János Péter =

Hungarian politician

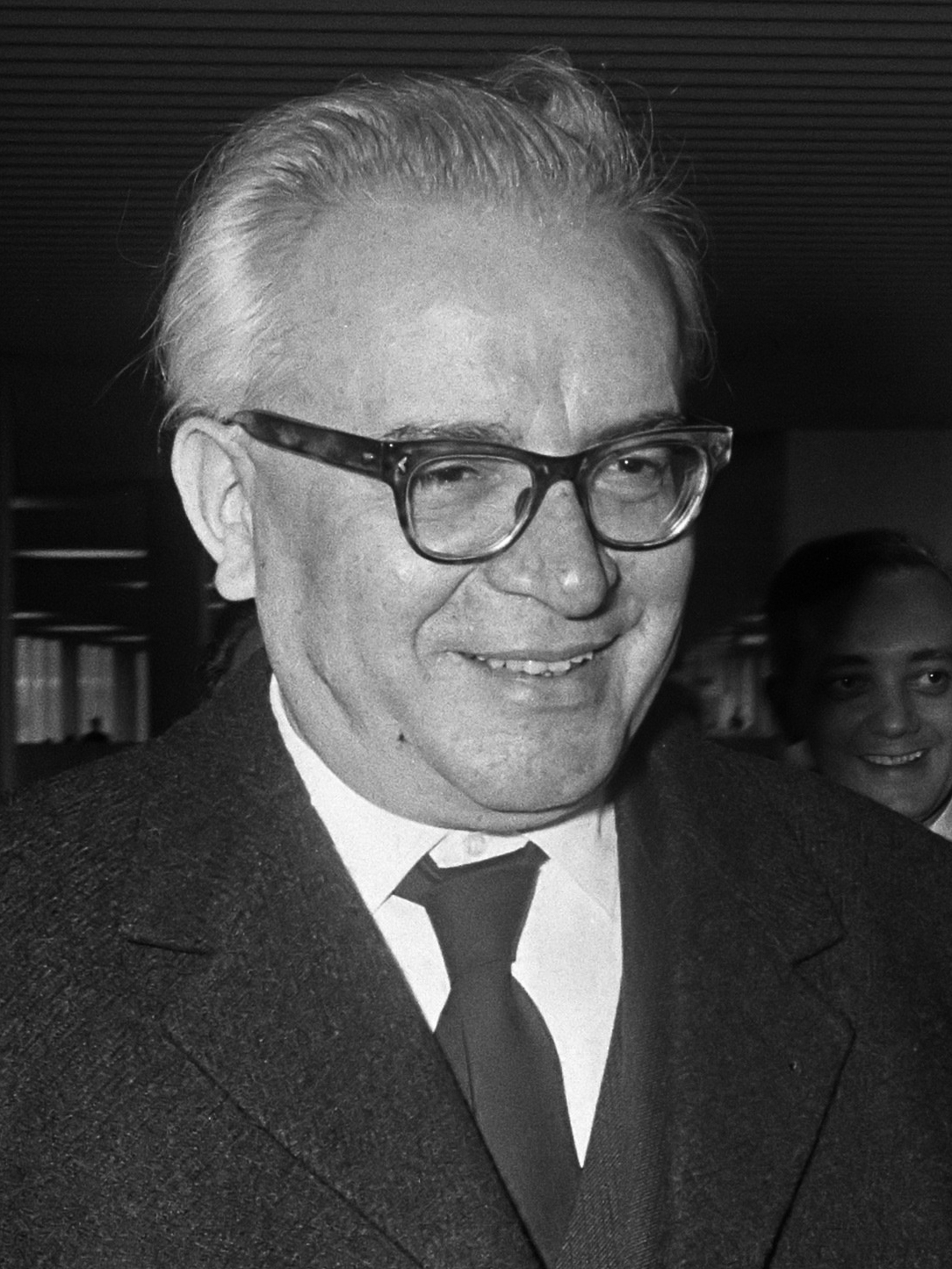

Minister of Foreign Affairs of Hungary
- In office 13 September 1961 – 14 December 1973
- Prime Minister: János Kádár; Gyula Kállai; Jenő Fock
- Preceded by: Endre Sík
- Succeeded by: Frigyes Puja

Personal details
- Born: 28 October 1910 Alsónyék, Austria-Hungary
- Died: 26 February 1999 (aged 88) Budapest, Hungary
- Party: MSZMP
- Profession: politician

János Péter (28 October 1910 – 26 February 1999) was a Hungarian politician, who served as Minister of Foreign Affairs between 1961 and 1973. Prior to that, he was a Calvinist bishop.

Dean Rusk, the US Secretary of State reported that Péter had attempted to defraud the United States by pretending to be in contact with the government of North Vietnam. Rusk engaged in what he at the time believed to be serious negotiations to end the war in Vietnam. However, a defector named János Radványi later informed Rusk "that Péter was not in an effective contact with Hanoi, and that they had had no encouragement from Hanoi about the things that Péter was saying to me." Rusk came to believe that the Péter overture "was an instance that was just a plain fraud."

Political offices
Preceded by Endre Sík	Minister of Foreign Affairs; 1961–1973	Succeeded by Frigyes Puja
