= Hungary–Pakistan relations =

- Pakistan: Hungary

Hungary–Pakistan relations are foreign relations between Hungary and Pakistan. Both countries established diplomatic relations on November 26, 1965. Since 1970, Hungary has an embassy in Islamabad and an honorary consulate in Karachi. Pakistan has an embassy in Budapest.

== Economic relations ==
As of 2013, Hungary has invested US$1.4 billion in the energy sector in Pakistan.

In 2012, the volume of trade between the two countries was US$56 million.

Hungarian based MOL Pakistan Oil & Gas Company has been operating since 2004 in Khyber Pakhtunkhwa.

== Defence co-operation ==
The Hungarian Chief of Defence Staff, General Andres Havril visited Pakistan Minister of Defence Rao Sikandar Iqbal.

== Hungarian assistance ==
The Hungarian Government has offered assistance to Pakistan during the 2011 floods and 2005 Kashmir earthquake.

== Resident diplomatic missions ==
of Hungary in Pakistan

- Embassy: Islamabad
- Consulate Honorary: Karachi

of Pakistan in Hungary

- Embassy: Budapest

== See also ==
- Foreign relations of Hungary
- Foreign relations of Pakistan
