= Sándor Sík =

Hungarian writer and priest

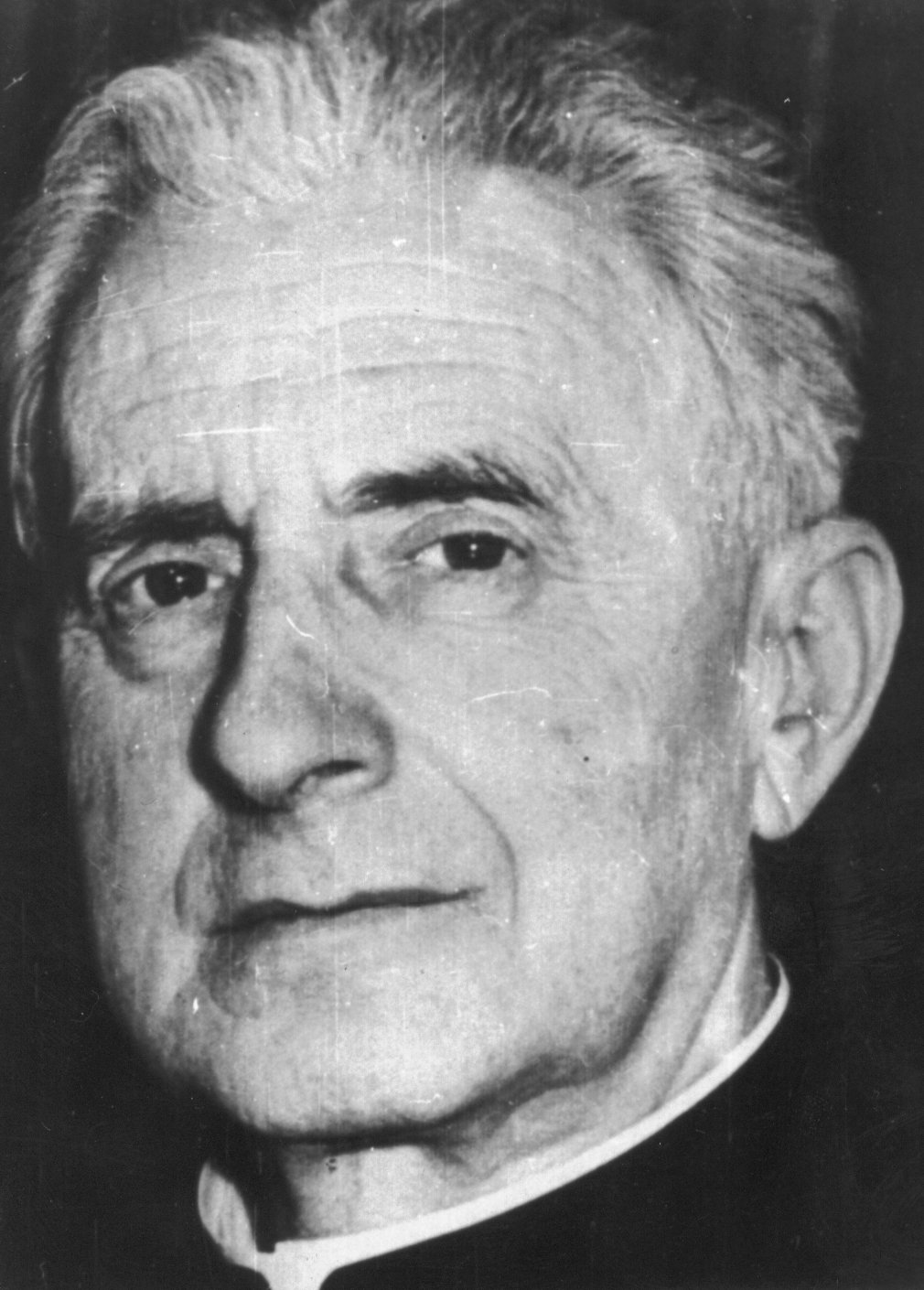
Sík Sándor

Sándor Sík (20 January 1889 – 28 September 1963) was a Hungarian writer and priest, a representative of the New Catholic poetry in Hungary. He was a professor of literature at Szeged University from 1930; from 1948 he was the Piarist Order's highest representative in Hungary. He published the Catholic magazine Vigilia. In addition to his poetry, his historical dramas and mystery plays saw success. His brother was Hungarian the communist politician Endre Sík.
