= Hungary–United States relations =

- Hungary: United States

Diplomatic mission
- Hungarian Embassy, Washington, D.C.: United States Embassy, Budapest

Envoy

Hungary and the United States are NATO allies and security partners. The U.S. Embassy in Hungary is located in Budapest, and the Hungarian Embassy in the U.S. is located in Washington, D.C.

After first recognizing the Hungarian state in 1848, the United States established diplomatic relations with the Kingdom of Hungary in 1921, following the dissolution of Austria-Hungary after World War I. Relations were severed during World War II and were reestablished in 1945. Following the collapse of the Hungarian People's Republic in 1989, the United States supported Hungary's transition to democracy and a market economy. Hungary acceded to NATO in 1999 and the European Union in 2004. Since then, the two countries have cooperated on security, trade, and transatlantic issues.

== History ==
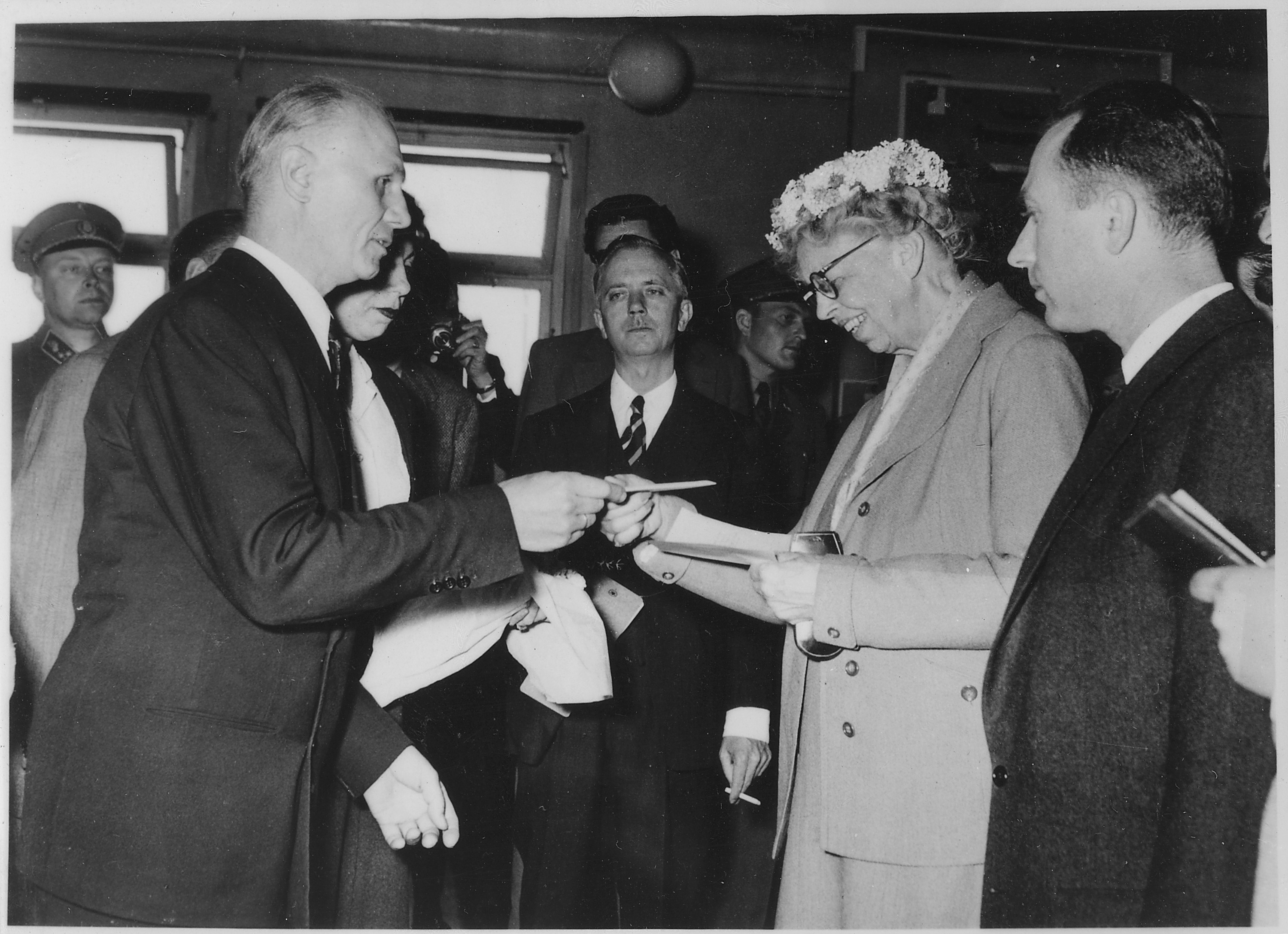
Eleanor Roosevelt with freedom fighters in 1957, following the Hungarian Revolution of 1956

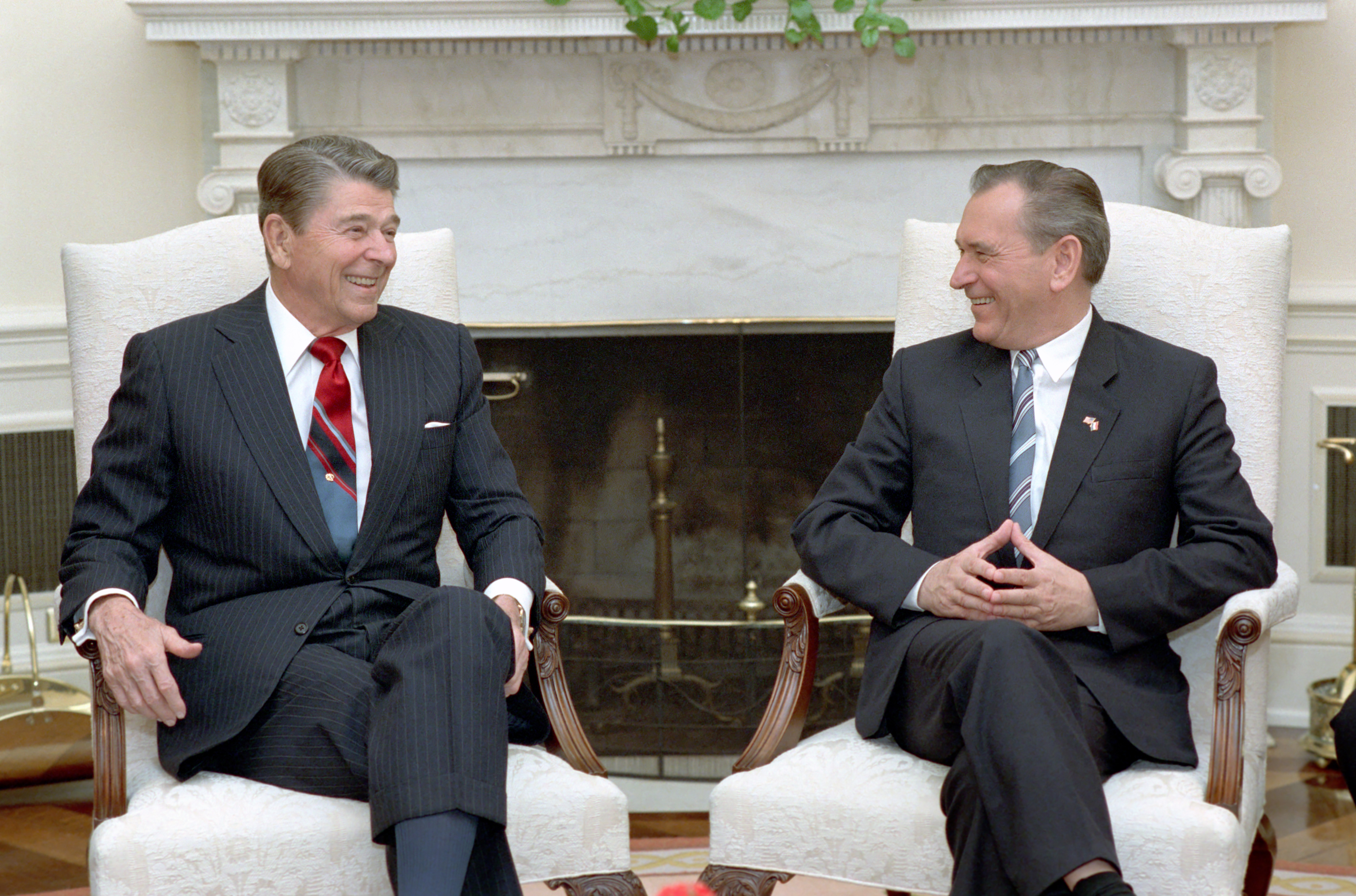
President Ronald Reagan with General Secretary Károly Grósz in 1988

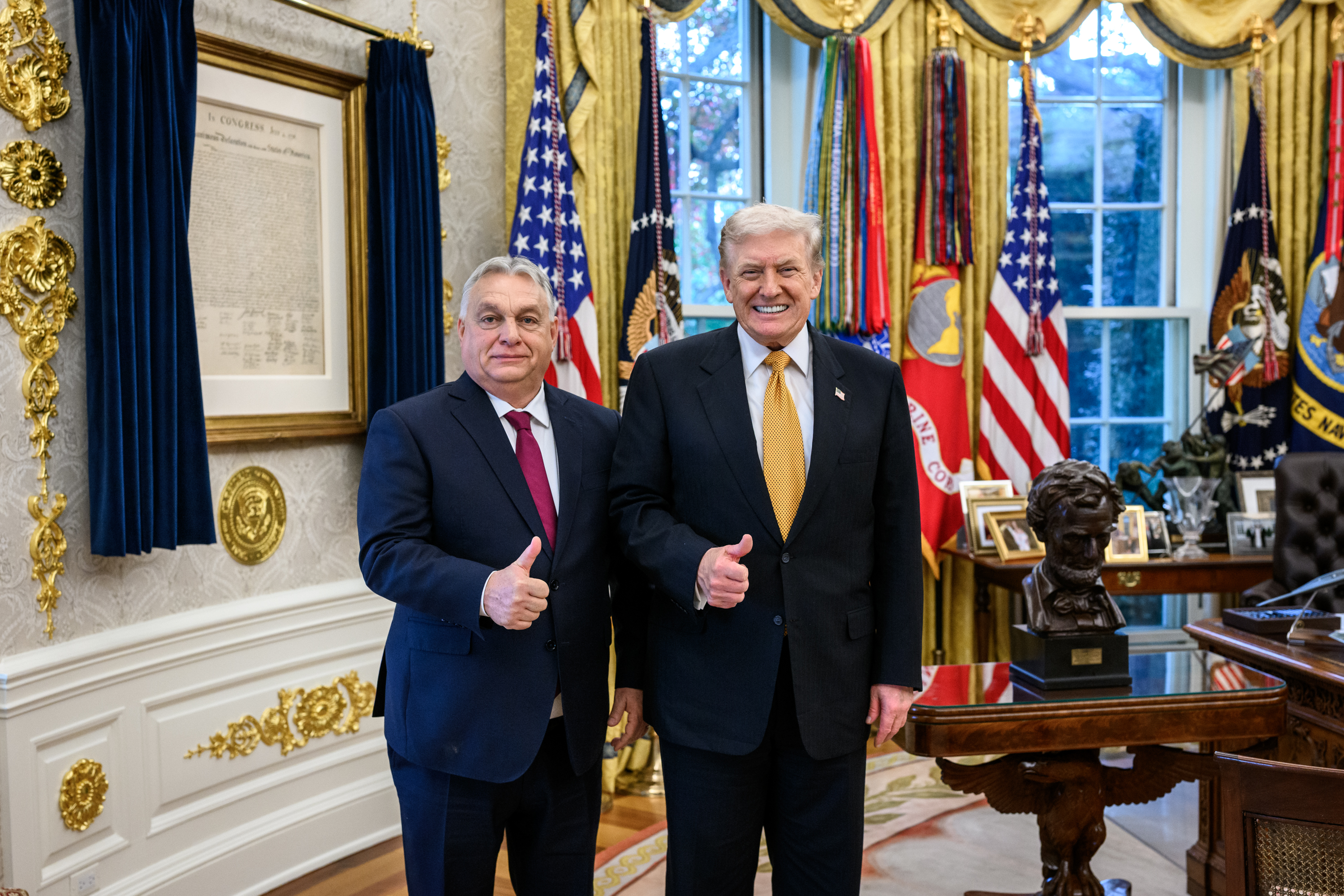
Prime Minister Viktor Orbán with President Donald Trump in 2025

The Hungarian State produced by the Hungarian Revolution of 1848 was recognised by the United States. Hungarian revolutionary Lajos Kossuth was brought to the United States by an American warship in 1851. An American diplomatic post to the Kingdom of Hungary was established in 1869, and upgraded to a consulate in 1904.

After the dissolution of Austria-Hungary, President Warren G. Harding called for the United States Congress to create a peace treaty between the United States and Hungary on 2 July 1921. Negotiations started in Budapest on 9 July 1921, and there were no difficulties as there was no significant conflict between the two sides during the war nor were any Americans held as prisoners of war. The U.S.–Hungarian Peace Treaty was signed on 29 August. The United States' legation was established in Budapest on 26 December 1921. Hungary opened its first consulates in New York City, Pittsburgh, Chicago, and Cleveland in 1922. László Széchenyi, the first Hungarian minister to the United States, presented his credentials on 11 January 1922, and served until 31 March 1933.

In the 1930s Standard Oil of New Jersey started exploring for oil in Hungary. The Hungarian-American Oil Corporation (MAORT) started oil production in 1937. This rose from 1.3 million tons of oil in 1937, to 37.3 million tons in 1938, and 141.8 million tons in 1939.

The United States represented the British after the United Kingdom and Hungary ended diplomatic relations on 7 April 1941. The British ultimatum to Hungary requesting that it end its participation in the war against the Soviet Union was delivered by Americans on 29 November. The United States was opposed to the United Kingdom declaring war on Hungary as it was believed that it would strengthen the pro-war faction in Hungary. The ultimatum expired and the British declared war on 7 December.

Germany's declaration of war against the United States resulted in László Bárdossy ending diplomatic relations with the United States on 11 December. Bárdossy was opposed to war with the United States as he felt it would be similar to Panama and Costa Rica declarations of war against Japan, as neither side would be greatly involved in the conflict against the subject of the declaration. However, Bárdossy informed Herbert Pell on 13 December that a state of war existed between the United States and Hungary.

U.S. Secretary of State Cordell Hull opposed declaring war on Hungary as he viewed it as a puppet state of Germany. On 2 June 1942, President Franklin D. Roosevelt requested the United States Congress to declare war on Bulgaria, Hungary, and Romania.

Tibor Eckhardt left Hungary on 7 March 1941, and travelled to the United States. Germany's Federal Foreign Office was suspicious of Eckhardt, but Horthy denied sending him on a mission. Eckhardt made contact with the United States Department of State as the leader of an independent Hungary movement. Eckhardt was stripped of his Hungarian citizenship in October. His independent Hungary movement disbanded in July 1942.

== Trade ==
In 2024, the United States' exported $2.64 billion to Hungary and Hungary exported $10.9 billion to the United States.

== Public opinion ==
According to the 2012 U.S. Global Leadership Report, 38% of Hungarians approve of U.S. leadership, with 20% disapproving and 42% uncertain, a decrease from 53% approval in 2011. In a 2018 Eurobarometer poll, 68% of Hungarians viewed the United States favorably. According to a 2026 Pew Research Center survey, 58% of Hungarians had a favorable view of the United States, while 38% had a negative view.

== High-level mutual visits ==
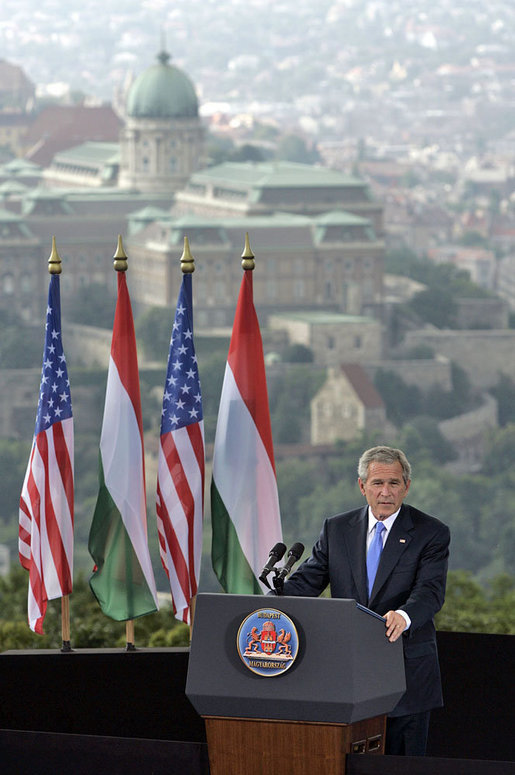
U.S. President George W. Bush speaking in Budapest, 2006

Guest	Host	Place of visit	Date of visit
(Hungarian Republic (1946–49)) Prime Minister Ferenc Nagy	(United States) President Harry S. Truman	Washington, D.C., New York City	June 11–17, 1946
(Hungarian People's Republic) Prime Minister Károly Grósz	(United States) President Ronald Reagan	Washington, D.C.	July 26–28, 1988
(United States) President George H. W. Bush	(Hungarian People's Republic) Prime Minister Miklós Németh	Budapest	July 11–13, 1989
(Hungary) Acting President Árpád Göncz	(United States) President George H. W. Bush	Washington, D.C.	May 18, 1990
(Hungary) Prime Minister József Antall	(United States) President George H. W. Bush	Washington, D.C.	October 18, 1990
(Hungary) President Árpád Göncz	(United States) President George H. W. Bush	Washington, D.C.	May 23, 1991
(Hungary) Prime Minister József Antall	(United States) President George H. W. Bush	Washington, D.C.	October 4, 1991
(Hungary) President Árpád Göncz	(United States) President Bill Clinton	Washington, D.C.	April 20–22, 1993
(Hungary) President Árpád Göncz	(United States) President Bill Clinton	Washington, D.C.	June 20–21, 1994
(United States) President Bill Clinton	(Hungary) President Árpád Göncz (Hungary) Prime Minister Gyula Horn	Budapest	December 5, 1994
(Hungary) Prime Minister Gyula Horn	(United States) President Bill Clinton	Washington, D.C.	June 6, 1995
(United States) President Bill Clinton	(Hungary) President Árpád Göncz (Hungary) Prime Minister Gyula Horn	Taszár	December 13, 1996
(Hungary) President Árpád Göncz	(United States) President Bill Clinton	Washington, D.C.	March 17–18, 1998
(Hungary) Prime Minister Viktor Orbán	(United States) President Bill Clinton	Washington, D.C.	October 5–8, 1998
(Hungary) Prime Minister Viktor Orbán	(United States) President Bill Clinton	Washington, D.C.	April 23–25, 1999
(Hungary) President Árpád Göncz	(United States) President Bill Clinton	Washington, D.C., Chicago	June 6–9, 1999
(Hungary) Prime Minister Viktor Orbán	(United States) President George W. Bush	Washington, D.C.	May 29, 2001
(Hungary) Prime Minister Péter Medgyessy	(United States) President George W. Bush	Washington, D.C.	November 7–9, 2002
(Hungary) Prime Minister Péter Medgyessy	(United States) President George W. Bush	Washington, D.C.	June 21–23, 2004
(Hungary) Prime Minister Ferenc Gyurcsány	(United States) President George W. Bush	Washington, D.C.	October 3–7, 2005
(United States) President George W. Bush	(Hungary) President László Sólyom (Hungary) Prime Minister Ferenc Gyurcsány	Budapest	June 21–22, 2006
(Hungary) Prime Minister Gordon Bajnai	(United States) President Barack Obama	Washington, D.C.	December 4, 2009
(Hungary) Prime Minister Viktor Orbán	(United States) President Barack Obama	Chicago	May 20–21, 2012
(Hungary) Prime Minister Viktor Orbán	(United States) President Donald Trump	Mar-a-Lago	July 11,2024
(Hungary) Prime Minister Viktor Orbán	(United States) President Donald Trump	Washington, D.C.	March 31 – April 1, 2016
(Hungary) Prime Minister Viktor Orbán	(United States) President Donald Trump	Washington, D.C.	May 13, 2019
(Hungary) Prime Minister Viktor Orbán	(United States) President Donald Trump	Washington, D.C.	November 7, 2025
(Hungary) Prime Minister Viktor Orbán	(United States) President Donald Trump	Washington, D.C.	July 13—19, 2026

On April 7–8 2026, Vice President JD Vance visited Hungary and held bilateral meetings with Prime Minister Viktor Orbán ahead of the 2026 Hungarian parliamentary election.

== Resident diplomatic missions ==
of Hungary in the United States

- Embassy (1): Washington, D.C.
- Consulate General (3): Chicago, Los Angeles, New York City
- Vice-Consulates (3): Houston, Miami, Santa Clara
- Honorary Consulate General (1): Atlanta
- Consulate Honorary (15): Atlanta, Buffalo, Charlotte, Cleveland, Daytona Beach, Denver, Derry, Hamden, Mayagüez, Minneapolis, Philadelphia, Sacramento, San Francisco, Sarasota, and Seattle.

of the United States in Hungary

- Embassy (1): Budapest
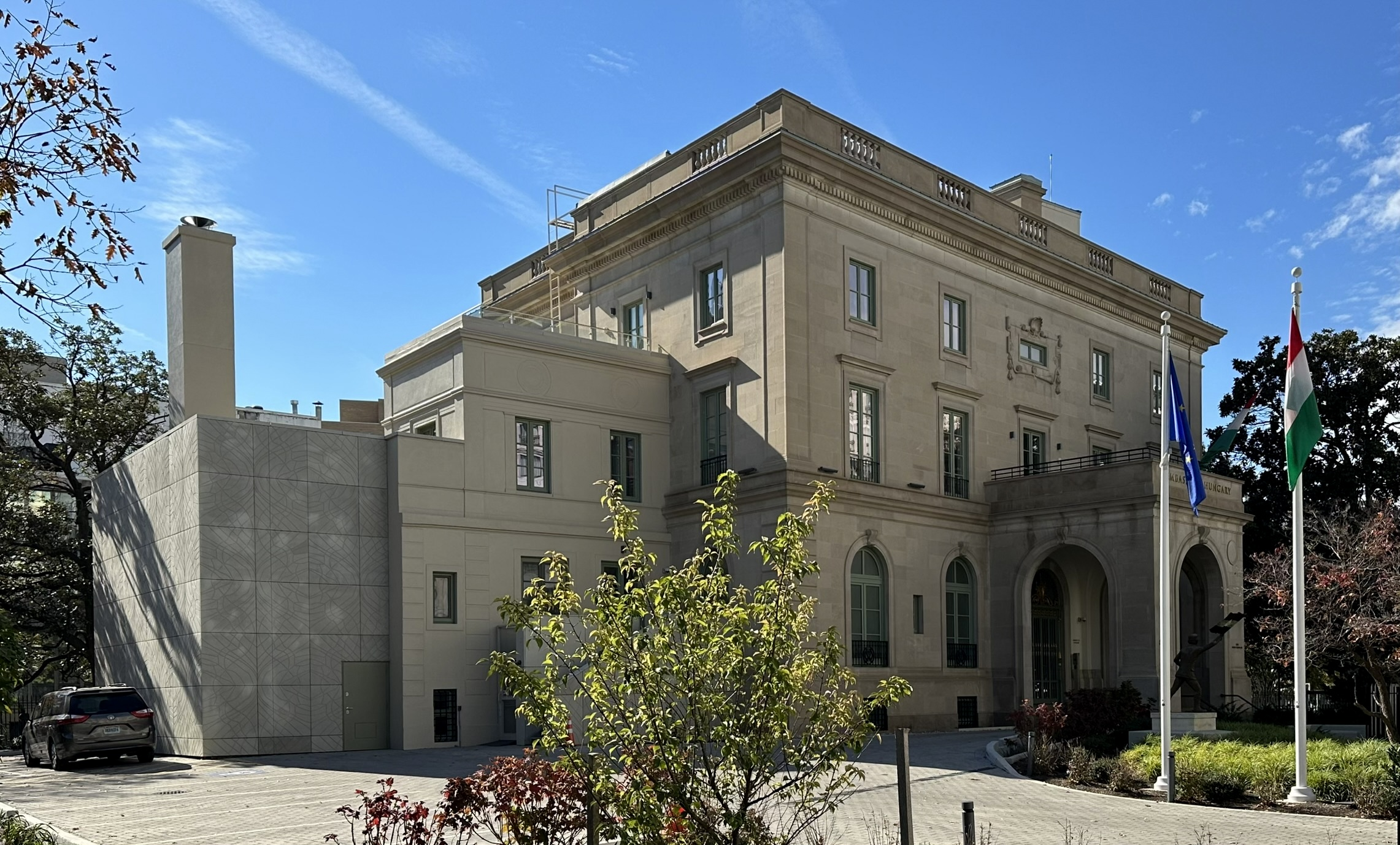
Embassy of Hungary in Washington, D.C.

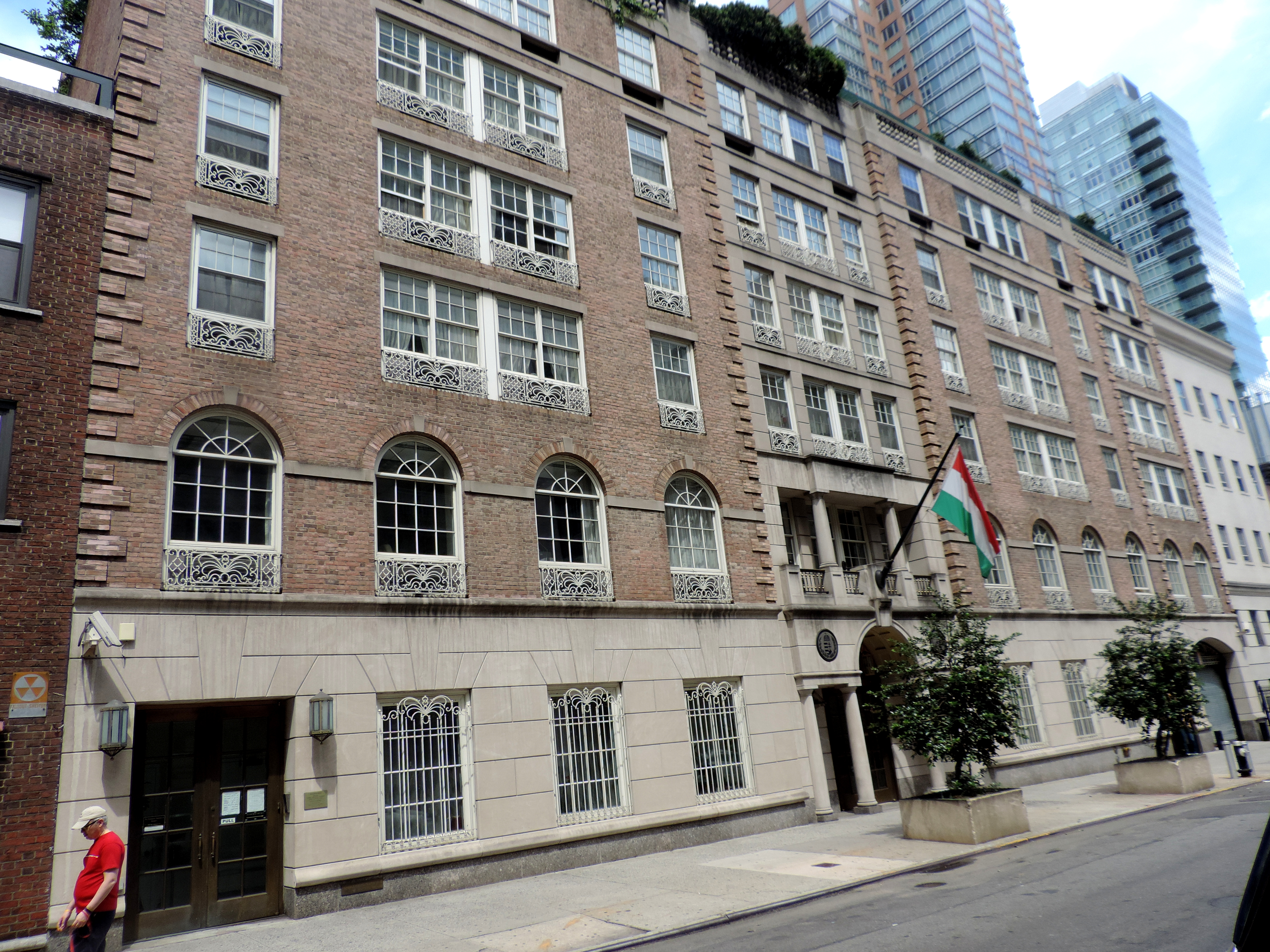
Consulate-General of Hungary in New York City

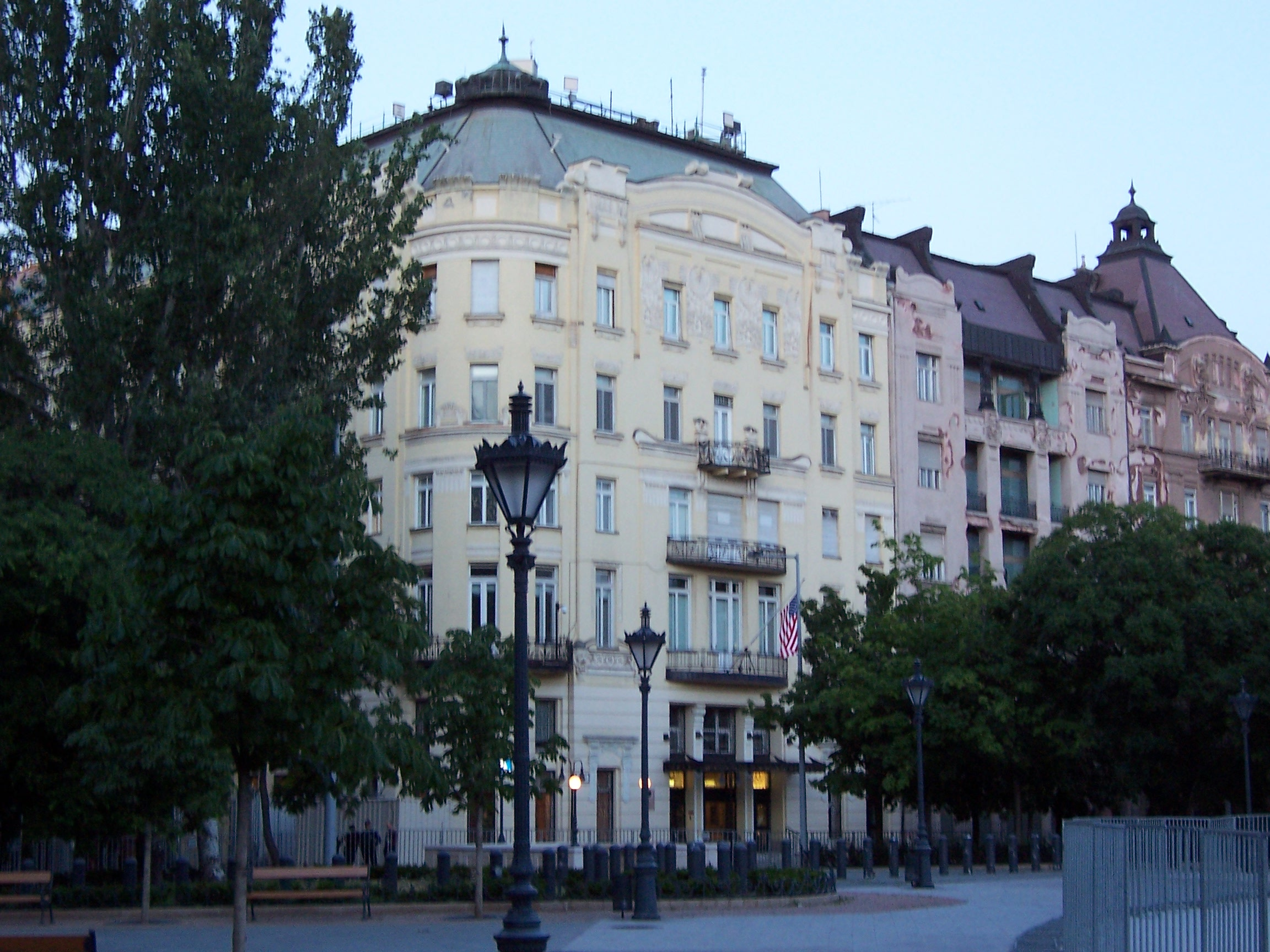
Embassy of the United States in Budapest

== Sister-Twinning cities ==
- Budapest and (New York (state)) New York City, New York
- Miskolc and Cleveland, Ohio
- Pécs and (Washington (state)) Seattle, Washington / Tucson, Arizona
- Siófok and Walnut Creek, California
- Szeged and Toledo, Ohio
- Tatabánya and Fairfield, Connecticut
- Tokaj and Sonoma, California

== See also ==
- Hungarian Americans
- Hungarian Ambassador to the United States
- United States Ambassador to Hungary
- Foreign relations of the United States
- Foreign relations of Hungary
- United States–European Union relations

== Works cited ==
=== Books ===
- Major, Mark (1974). American Hungarian Relations 1918-1944. Danubian Press. ISBN 0879340363.
- Fenyo, Mario (1972). Hitler, Horthy, and Hungary: German-Hungarian Relations, 1941-1944. Yale University Press. ISBN 978-0-300-01468-6.

=== Web ===
- "Hungary-U.S. Diplomatic Relations". Library of Congress. Archived from the original on 6 July 2025.
- "Message to Congress on a State of War Between the United States and Hungary, Rumania, and Bulgaria". The American Presidency Project. Archived from the original on 6 July 2025.
