= A Fairytale for Everyone =

2020 Hungarian fairy tale compilation

- Original cover
- Editor: Boldizsár M. Nagy
- Original title: Meseország mindenkié
- Illustrator: Lilla Bölecz
- Language: Hungarian
- Genre: Fairy tale
- Publisher: Labrisz Lesbian Association
- Publication date: 20 September 2020
- Publication place: Hungary
- Pages: 180
- ISBN: 9786150089287

A Fairytale for Everyone (Hungarian: Meseország mindenkié, lit. 'Fairyland Belongs to Everyone') is a Hungarian anthology of fairy tales published by the Labrisz Lesbian Association in 2020. The volume contains retellings of traditional fairy tales in which the main characters belong to different marginalised groups or minorities.

It was coordinated by Dorottya Rédai, edited by Boldizsár M. Nagy and illustrated by Lilla Bölecz.

== Contents ==
The book contains 17 adaptations of classic fairy tales by Hungarian authors.

English title	Original title	Author	Based on
The Bird with the Ruby-Red Feathers	Rubinpiros madár	Krisztina Rita Molnár	Myth of Caeneus
Autumn Brown	Avarbarna	Eszter Gangl	"Snow White"
The Witch's Tale	A boszorkány meséje	István Lakatos	"Hansel and Gretel"
The Ice King	A Jégkirály	Judit B. Tóth	"The Snow Queen"
Iron Imi	Vaslaci	Andrea Tompa	
Margaret the Giant Killer	Óriásölő Margaret	Dóra Gimesi	
Koni's Antlers	Az őzike agancsa	Edit Szűcs	Bambi, a Life in the Woods
The Kidnapped Princess	Az elrabolt királykisasszony	Edit Pengő	
Róza Goes to the Ball	Róza a bálban	Judit Ágnes Kiss	
Little Lina's Great Adventure	Picur Panna nagy kalandja	Noémi Rebeka Horváth	"Thumbelina"
Kitty and Karola	Kincső és Karola	Sára Harka	The Prince and the Pauper
Threeodore the Three-Eared Rabbit	Trivadar, a háromfülű nyúl	Kriszta Kasza	
The Twirly-Whirly Drinking Straws	A kacskaringós szívószál	Edina Kertész	
The Great Alfredo	A nagy Alfredo	Orsolya Ruff	
Be Lucky, Batbayan!	Légy szerencsés, Batbaján!	Brigitta Kovács "Efi"	"Cinderella"
Thumbelina Gets a Life	Panna élni megy	Petra Finy	"Thumbelina"
A Princely Wedding	Házasodik a herceg	Zoltán Csehy	

== Background and release ==
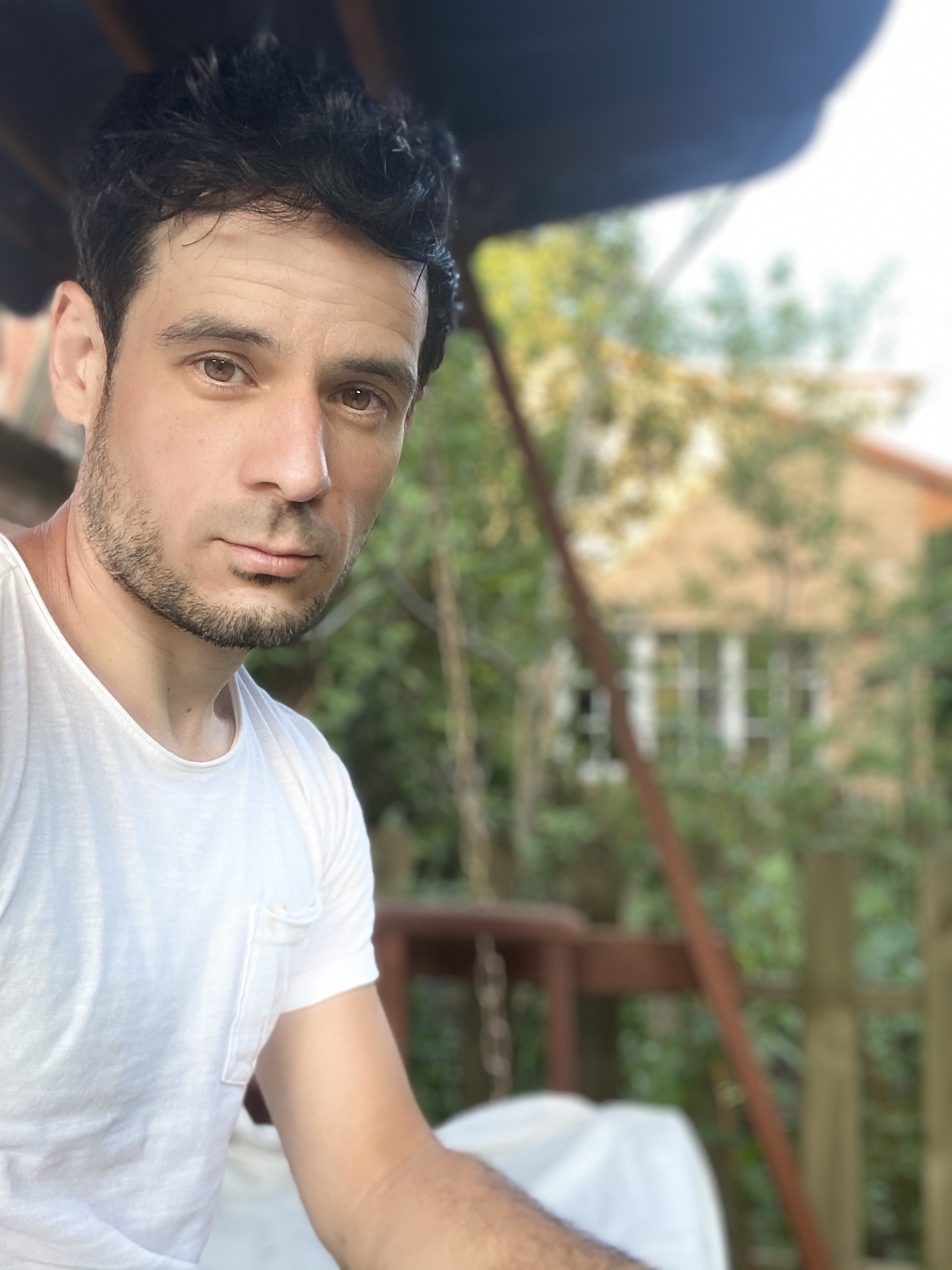
Boldizsár M. Nagy, the book's editor

Györgyi Kövesi, a teacher participating in an educational programme organized by the Labrisz Lesbian Association to promote understanding of LGBTQ issues among high school students, conceived the original idea of a fairy tale book aimed at younger children that is capable of shaping perspectives by portraying the lives of people belonging to minorities. After Kövesi presented the concept to her colleagues at Labrisz, the organization applied for a grant aimed at promoting diversity, which they successfully secured. In the autumn of 2019, the association approached Boldizsár M. Nagy to join the project as an editor. Dorottya Rédai, an academic and long-time activist of the association, joined the preparations as project coordinator.

In November 2019, Labrisz announced a fairy tale writing competition for amateur writers, calling for adaptations of classic tales set in a contemporary setting and featuring characters belonging to stigmatised or minority groups. The association received more than eighty submissions for the competition. The works were evaluated by a panel of four including Nagy, Rédai, psychologist Anna Borgos, as well as educator and bibliotherapist Noémi Lőrincz. Borgos stated that the primary objective in the selection process was "to represent the widest possible range of minority and marginalised characters and life experiences in the book".

Ultimately, eight submissions were selected to be featured in the anthology. Furthermore, nine prominent Hungarian authors were invited to contribute a fairy tale each to the volume.

On 20 September 2020, a book launch event took place at the Massolit bookstore in Budapest. The event was held behind closed doors to prevent demonstrations by anti-LGBTQ groups. The book was officially released by Labrisz on 21 September.

== Reception ==
The book's first edition had a print run of 1500 copies. While the creators had originally expected it to sell out in two to three years, the volume sold out in less than two weeks due to the considerable attention it received. The second printing was published in October 2020 with 15,000 copies, followed by a third printing in November. Within the first three months of the book's release, it sold more than 19,000 copies, and within a year, sales reached 30,000 copies.

=== Critical reception ===
Writing for 24.hu, György Balavány called the anthology a "movement pamphlet of fluctuating quality". While acknowledging the noble intentions and sense of social mission behind its publication, he opined that many of the included tales function as moral lessons or outright "ideological propaganda". He argued that these "heavy-handed fables" are too intent on conveying a message, therefore lacking the subtlety that characterises real works of art. On the other hand, he praised the literary and narrative qualities of some stories, writing that they feature "genuine life situations, conflicts, and characters that are accessible and relatable for children" while lacking any sense of deliberate intent.

In a positive review, Olaf Tempelman of de Volkskrant rated the book's Dutch translation four stars out of five, writing that the fairy tales are "funny and at times truly moving".

=== Controversy over LGBTQ themes ===
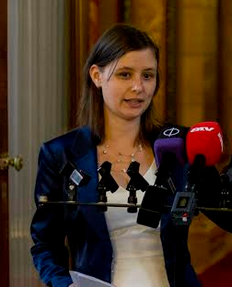
Dóra Dúró's shredding of the book's pages provoked significant criticism.

On 23 September 2020, two days after the volume's release, ultraconservative group CitizenGO launched an online petition, headed by the organization's national campaign director Eszter Schittl, in which they called on several bookstores to stop distributing the book, claiming that it "poses a threat to the innocence and safe development of children". The petition was signed by over 80,000 people.

On 25 September, far-right political party Our Homeland Movement held a press conference during which Dóra Dúró, the party's deputy president and member of the National Assembly, declared that the party "will not tolerate that children are exposed to homosexual propaganda" in the form of "sneaking the abnormal lifestyle into storybooks". After her speech, Dúró ripped several pages out of the book and inserted them into a paper shredder. In a Facebook post, she referred to the volume as "the propaganda book of homosexualism [sic]" and "an attack on children's healthy development and on Hungarian culture".

The actions of Our Homeland Movement sparked widespread criticism. The Hungarian Publishers' and Booksellers' Association (MKKE) issued a statement condemning the event, stating that the "politically driven destruction of books [...] is not merely an expression of opinion, but an alignment with the legacy of Nazi book burners and communist book crushers." HUBBY, the national chapter of the International Board on Books for Young People also issued a statement in which they distanced themselves from the action.

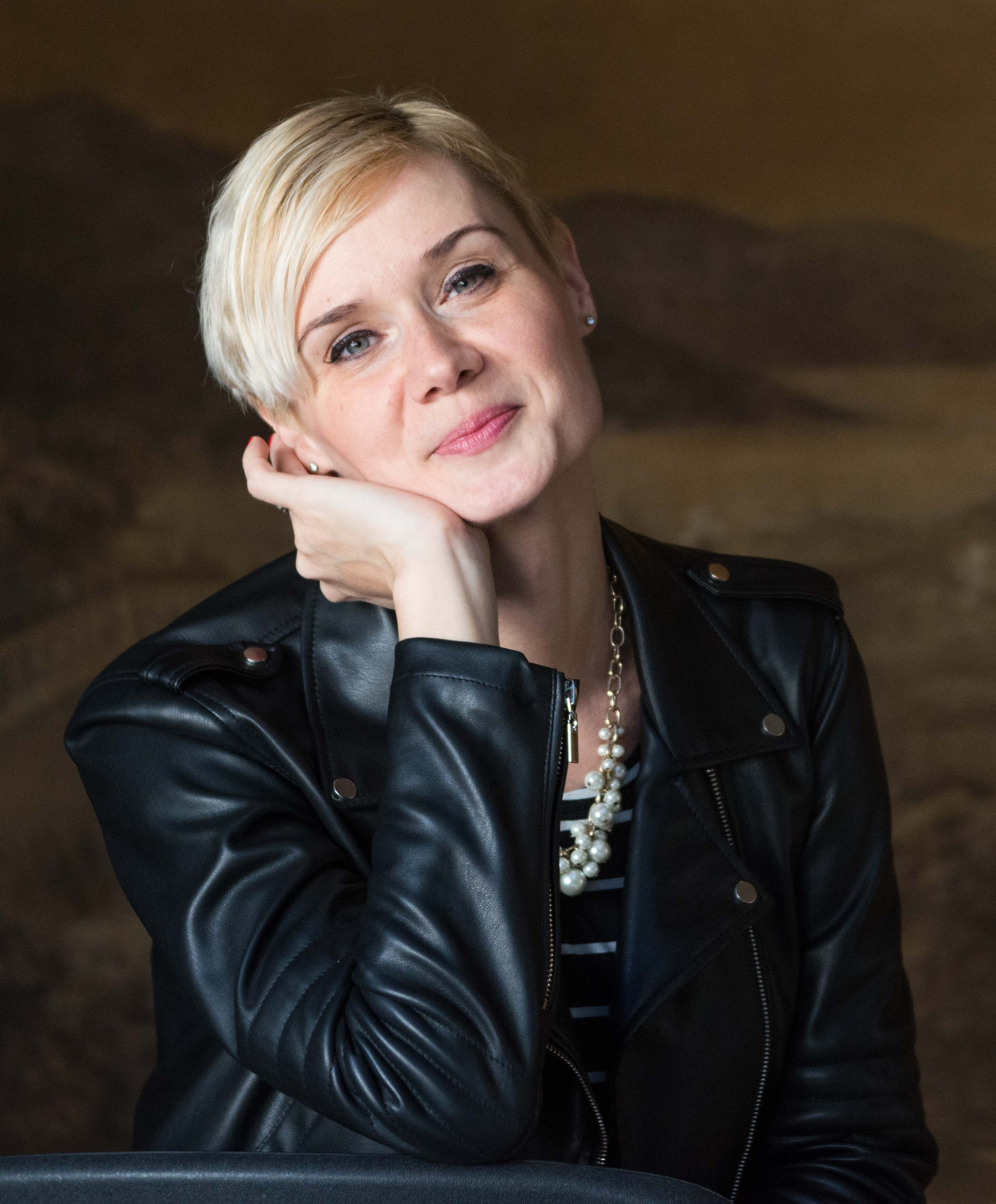
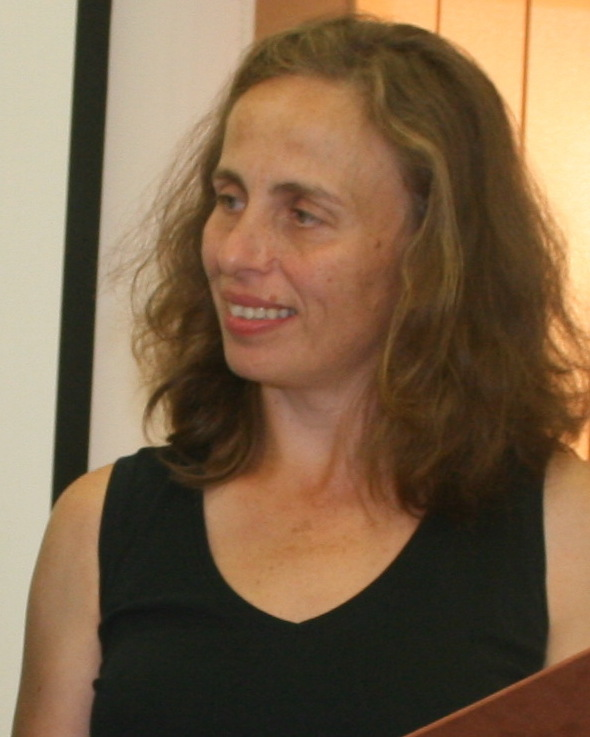
Petra Finy (left) and Andrea Tompa (right), two of the book's contributors, both noted the violent nature of the backlash against its publication.

Writer Andrea Tompa, one of the book's authors, commented that the shredding of the book is "no different from book burning" and described book destruction as a form of violence. Krisztina Rita Molnár, another contributor, condemned the petition and the shredding, comparing the events to the plot of the novel Fahrenheit 451. Petra Finy, who also authored a tale in the book, said that the aggressive reactions that the book received reflect "the emotional crisis and regression" of Hungarian society. Several Hungarian celebrities, including rapper Tomi Fluor, singer-songwriter Péter Geszti, and television presenters Lilu and Csilla Tatár, also condemned the book shredding. In response to the backlash against the book, English actor Ian McKellen wrote in a Facebook post, "I wish I could have read this book when I was a child."

On 4 October, Hungarian prime minister Viktor Orbán was asked about A Fairytale for Everyone in an interview on Kossuth Rádió's weekly programme Vasárnapi Újság. He described the book's release as a "provocative demonstration" and commented that while "Hungary is a patient, tolerant country as regards homosexuality [...] there is a red line that cannot be crossed, and this is how I would sum up my opinion: leave our children alone." Four days later, Gergely Gulyás, Minister of the Prime Minister's Office, stated that any kindergarten that implements the book "must be investigated to determine whether it involves the crime of child endangerment. If confirmed, legal action must be taken against the [kindergarten's] operator."

When asked about the controversy in an interview with conservative newspaper Magyar Nemzet on 8 October, prominent psychologist Emőke Bagdy stated that early sensitization on gender identity among preschool-aged children can pose a risk because social influences may alter the activity of regulatory genes, disrupting the harmony between biological sex and social gender. She also claimed that fairy tales can serve as a medium for "deliver[ing] messages that a child accepts without critique". Two days later, a joint declaration was issued by psychologists who asserted that Bagdy's earlier statement "contain[s] unprofessional claims contrary to the current state of scientific knowledge" and that "the book addresses important social issues and incorporates them into the world of tales, which poses no danger to either children or other members of society." Within days, more than 1200 psychologists signed the declaration in protest.

=== Awards and honours ===
In 2021, Dorottya Rédai was included on Time magazine's Time 100 list of the year's most influential people for his role in the book's publication. In her recognition, German MEP Terry Reintke called her "a symbol of the courage needed" in Hungary's hostile political climate.

At the 2021 Festive Book Week, A Fairytale for Everyone received the Student Jury Prize for the Most Innovative Book of the Year at the Children's Book of the Year Awards organized by HUBBY.

== Translations ==
As of 2023, the anthology was translated into eleven languages.

The first edition of the Dutch translation sold out within a few weeks, prompting the release of a second printing. In December 2021, English PEN announced that the English edition, translated by Anna Bentley, would be supported by a PEN Translates award.
