= János Áder =

President of Hungary from 2012 to 2022

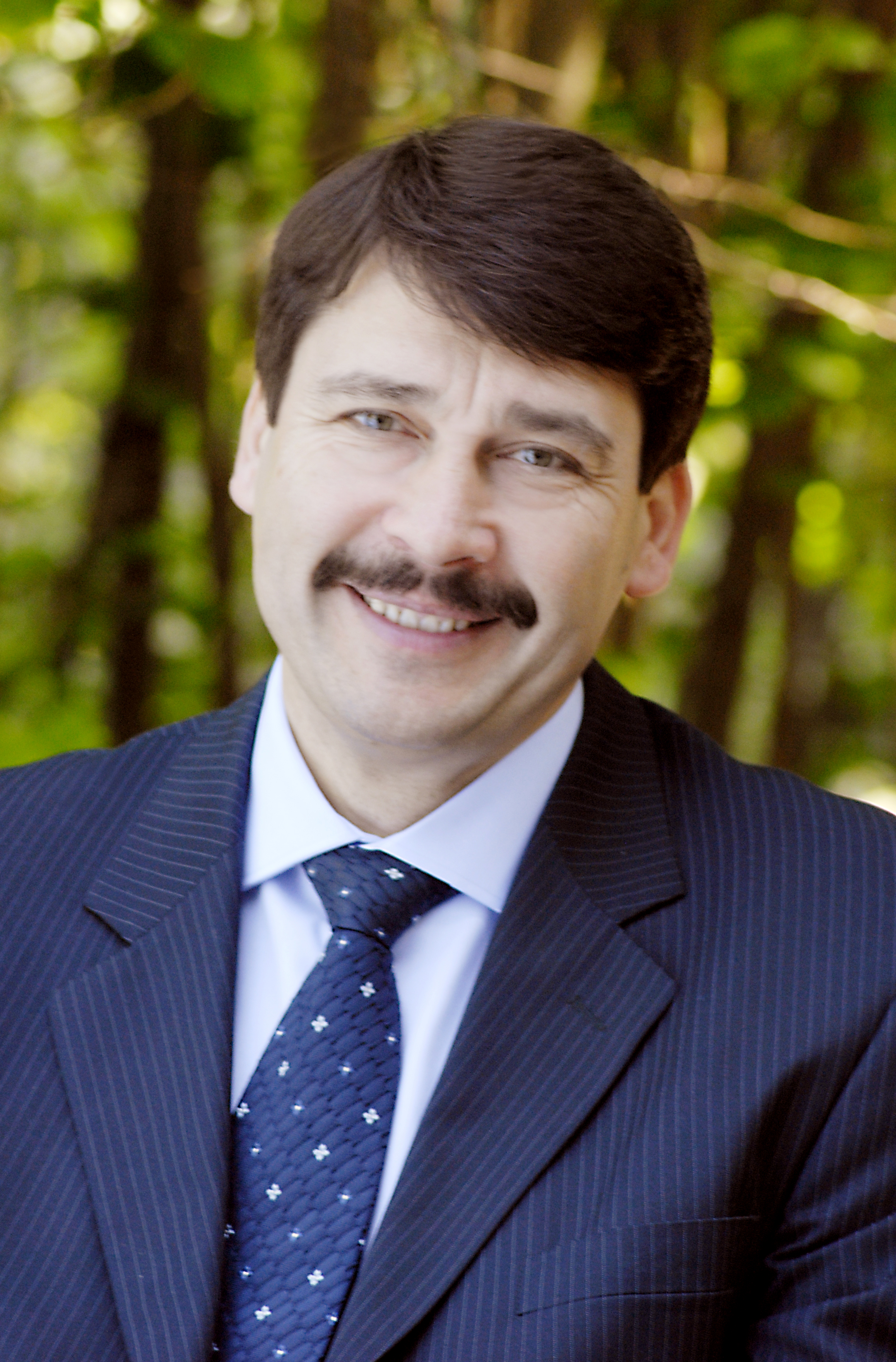
- Official portrait, 2012

President of Hungary
- In office 10 May 2012 – 10 May 2022
- Prime Minister: Viktor Orbán
- Preceded by: Pál Schmitt (Note: László Kövér served as acting president between Schmitt's resignation and Áder's inauguration.)
- Succeeded by: Katalin Novák

Speaker of the National Assembly
- In office 18 June 1998 – 14 May 2002
- Preceded by: Zoltán Gál
- Succeeded by: Katalin Szili

Member of the European Parliament
- In office 13 July 2009 – 10 May 2012

Member of the National Assembly
- In office 2 May 1990 – 13 July 2009

President of Fidesz
- In office 3 July 2002 – 17 May 2003
- Preceded by: Zoltán Pokorni
- Succeeded by: Viktor Orbán

Personal details
- Born: 9 May 1959 (age 67) Csorna, Hungarian People's Republic
- Party: Fidesz
- Spouse: Anita Herczegh
- Children: 4
- Education: Eötvös Loránd University

János Áder (Note: Hungarian pronunciation: [ˈjaːnoʃ ˈaːdɛr]) (born 9 May 1959) is a Hungarian politician and lawyer who served as President of Hungary from 2012 to 2022. A member of Fidesz, he took part in the Hungarian Round Table Talks during the end of communism in Hungary in 1989, before serving as a member of the National Assembly of Hungary from 1990 to 2009 and as its speaker from 1998 to 2002. He temporarily presided Fidesz between 2002 and 2003. He served as leader of the Fidesz parliamentary group between 2002 and 2006.

Áder was elected as an MEP during the 2009 European Parliament election. He was Deputy Chairman of the European Parliament Committee on the Environment, Public Health and Food Safety from January to May 2012, when he was elected president after his predecessor Pál Schmitt resigned due to a plagiarism controversy. Áder was the first president to serve two terms since Árpád Göncz, and was thus barred from re-election in 2022; he was succeeded by fellow Fidesz politician Katalin Novák.

== Early life and education ==
János Áder was born into a Roman Catholic family in the small town of Csorna in Győr-Moson-Sopron County, the son of shop assistant János Áder, Sr. (1932–1980) and accountant Terézia Szabó (born 1938), who worked for the local hospital and retired from there as deputy director for financial affairs. Áder grew up in his hometown and completed his elementary studies there. Beginning in 1978, he studied law for five years at the faculty of Law and Political Sciences at Eötvös Loránd University in Budapest. From 1986 to 1990, he was a research fellow at the Hungarian Academy of Sciences' Sociological Research Institute.

== Early political career ==
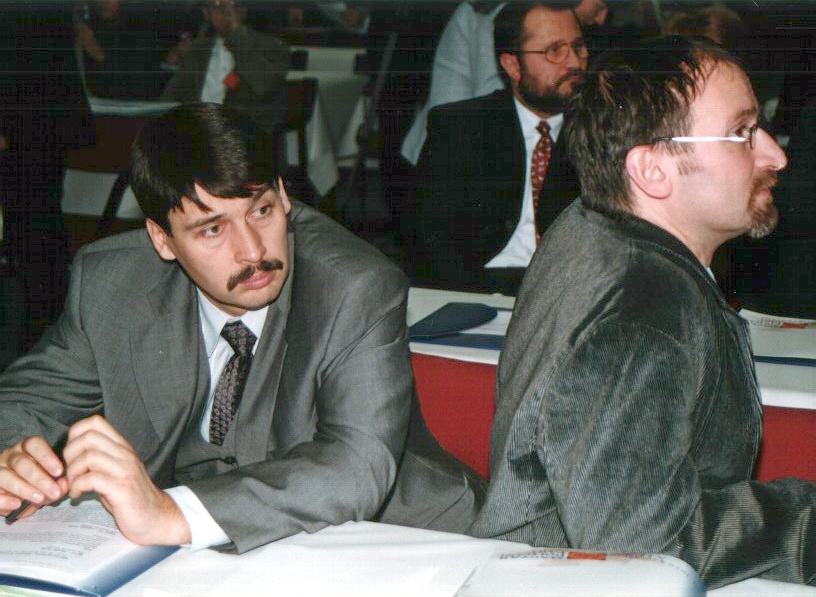
János Áder and József Szájer in 2000, during the first Fidesz government

By the late 1980s, Áder had joined the nascent Fidesz, a liberal-democratic party at the time, serving as a party legal expert. He became a member of the Opposition Round Table talks that negotiated an end to single-party rule in Hungary in 1989.

Áder began his national political career during this transition to democracy, serving as the leader of Fidesz's national campaigns during the 1990 and 1994 parliamentary elections and as an MP from 1990 to 2009. During his twelve-year parliamentary tenure Áder served in a variety of leadership roles. From 9 September 1997 to 17 June 1998 he served as Deputy Speaker of the National Assembly, and, during the first Orbán government (18 June 1998 – 15 May 2002), as Speaker of the National Assembly. With Fidesz in opposition after the 2002 election, Áder led the Fidesz caucus opposition.

=== MEP ===
Áder ran successfully as a candidate during the 2009 European-parliamentary election and consequently resigned from the Hungarian parliament. On 23 January 2012, he was elected a deputy chairman of the European Committee on the Environment, Public Health and Food Safety. In 2011, following Fidesz's supermajority victory at the Hungarian polls one year earlier, Áder helped draft legislation modifying Hungary's judiciary and electoral laws; the former was challenged (but upheld) before the European Court of Justice.

== Presidency (2012–2022) ==
=== First term ===
On 16 April 2012, Áder was selected by the majority of the parliament, and became the new President of Hungary after the resignation of Pál Schmitt. He was elected on 2 May to a five-year term by a vote of 262–40, and assumed office on 10 May 2012. He is consequently the first president to hold that office since the new Hungarian constitution took effect on 1 January 2012.

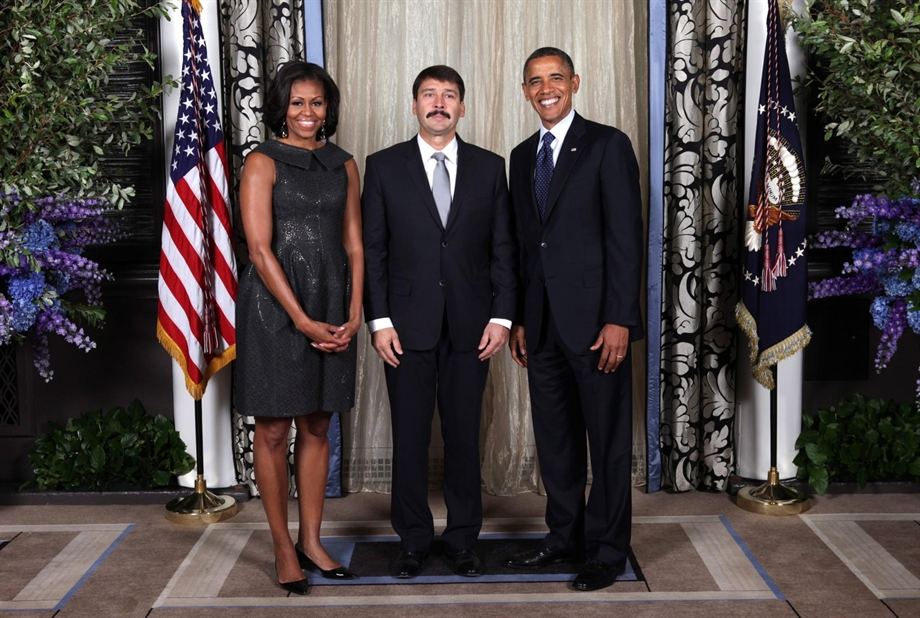
János Áder with U.S. President Barack Obama and First Lady Michelle Obama in New York City, 2012 (UN 67th General Assembly)

János Áder met Shimon Peres at a working dinner in Jerusalem on 15 July 2012, and invited the Israeli President for an official visit to Hungary. Áder told that their conversation had focused on deepening scientific cooperation between the two countries, in which Hungary could benefit from Israel's experience in areas such as farming and water management. On 16 July, he told a commemoration of Raoul Wallenberg in the Knesset, that The Holocaust is "the tragedy of mankind without parallel". He said the rise of anti-Semitism in several countries in Europe had been discussed, he said, "adding that steps against such phenomena must be taken together". Later, The Simon Wiesenthal Centre asked Áder in an open letter sent to MTI to help bring alleged Nazi war criminal László Csizsik-Csatáry to justice "as quickly as possible".

Áder said Hungary's new constitution guarantees constitutional rights and catered for fourth generation human rights in his address of the 67th session of the UN General Assembly in New York City on 25 September 2012. These include Article P, which states that "natural resources, especially the farmland, forests and the drinking water supplies, the biodiversity – in particular native plant and animal species – and the cultural assets shall form part of the nation's common heritage; the State and every person shall be obliged to protect, sustain and preserve them for future generations". He mentioned especially the water supply, and how short-sighted and irrational it was the way "we pollute our waters". Áder also told Hungary has taken active part in the work of the UN's Friends of Water working group. Hungary hosted a conference on water and sanitation in Budapest in 2013.

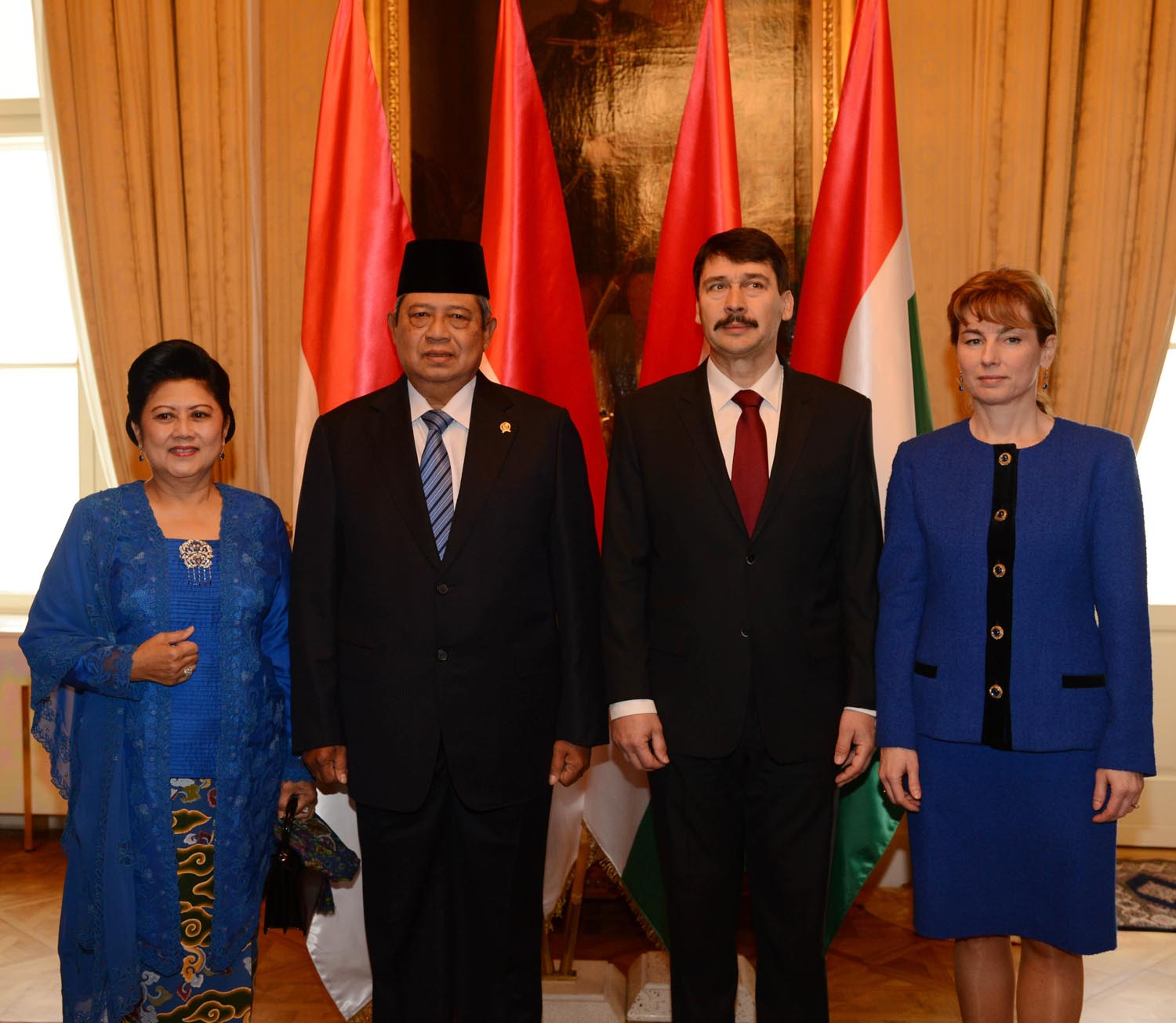
President Áder and First Lady Anita Herczegh with Indonesian President Susilo Bambang Yudhoyono and First Lady Kristiani Herawati in March 2013

He sent the election procedures bill to the Constitutional Court for preliminary legal review on 6 December 2012. He stressed in a statement that the bill passed by Parliament on 26 November guarantees free and democratic elections. On 3 January 2013, the Court ruled that the law curtailed voting rights to an unjustifiable degree, due to the fact that the requirement for voters to register prior to going to the polls applies to every voter. As a result, Antal Rogán announced the government will not introduce voter pre-registration in the 2014 parliamentary election.

On 13 March 2013, Áder said he would sign the controversial fourth amendment to Hungary's constitution. He stated that he had made his decision in view of his promise that as President of Hungary he would carry out the responsibilities conferred on him by the constitution without fail. "It is my unequivocal constitutional duty to sign and declare this constitutional amendment as law. This is regardless of whose tastes the changes meet and regardless of whether I like it or not", he said. Áder read letters, messages and the "clever and sometimes indignant and politically-charged arguments of experts". "I was guided by the single goal which is in harmony with my presidential oath: to represent the constitutional order and the unity of the nation," he said. Accordingly, Áder signed the constitutional amendment on 25 March 2013.

In June 2013, Áder apologised in the national parliament of Serbia for Hungarians' war crimes against civilian Serbs in Vojvodina in the Second World War. Some days earlier the Serbian lawmakers adopted a declaration, which condemned the massacre in Vojvodina in 1944-45 and resolutions made under the principle of collective guilt during the war. Áder said "although nobody can undo those crimes, we still believe that forgiveness following a mutual apology can point beyond reconciliation. Because we, Hungarians of today, and Serbs of today, stand united as one on the side of the innocent victims. The legacy we want to pass on to our children is that of life, justice and cooperation, and not that of death, untruth and hatred".

Continuing his efforts in the European Parliament, Áder emphasized the importance of environmental protection and the fight against global warming. In January 2015, he announced the establishment of an Environmental Sustainability Directorate within the President's Office. Csaba Kőrösi, former Permanent Representative of Hungary to the United Nations was appointed director of the organization. Áder explained the issue of sustainability must be arch over governmental terms and there is need to put the Kyoto agreement on a new basis. Opposition news portal Index claimed Áder intended to candidate for the position of Secretary-General of the United Nations during the 2016 selection process to succeed Ban Ki-moon, and his climate policy and efforts were part of his international campaign. Áder would not comment on the assumption, and his alleged ambition of candidacy had never materialized.

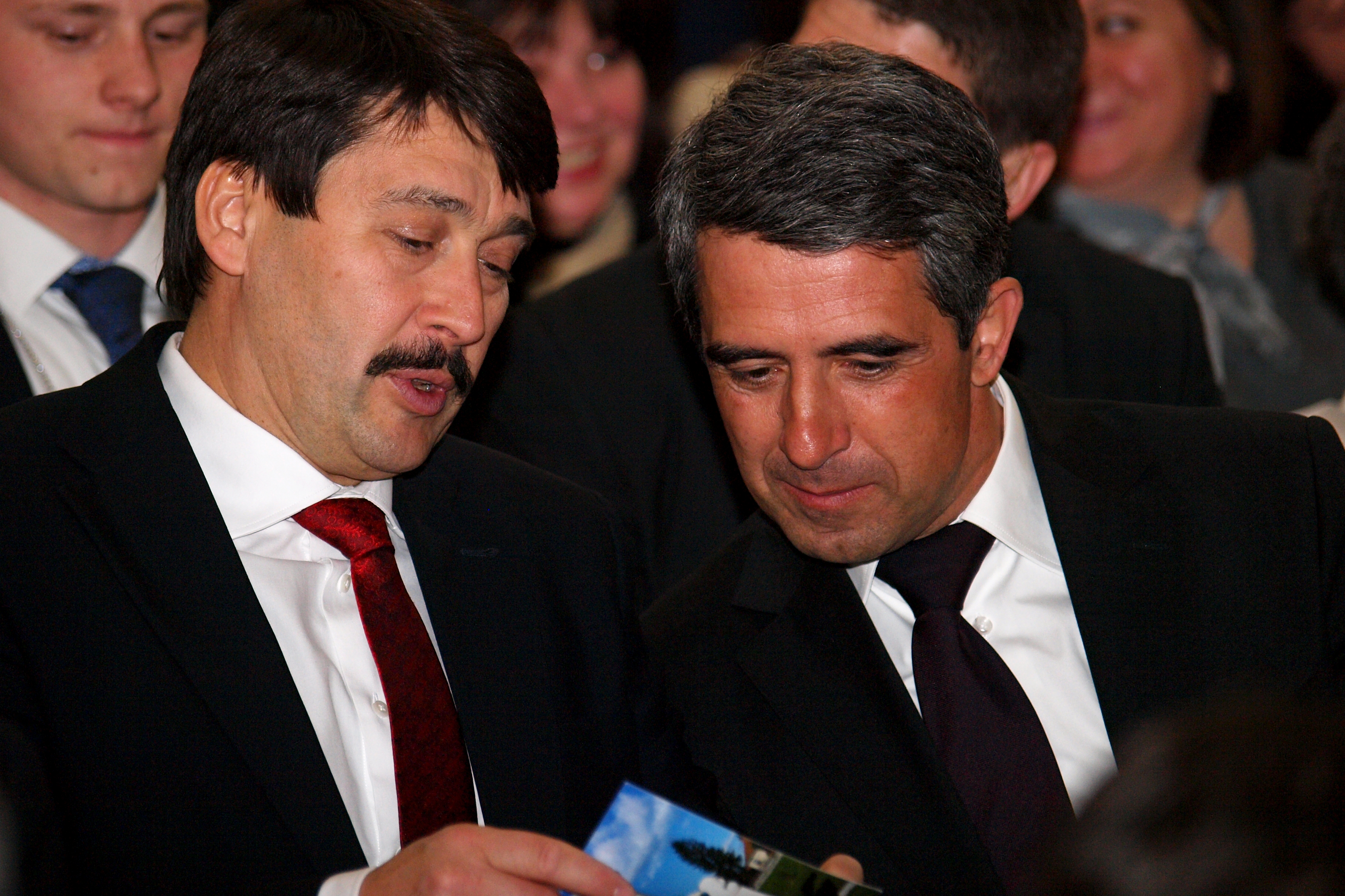
Áder and Bulgarian President Rosen Plevneliev in April 2013

In December 2015, he delivered a speech during the United Nations Climate Change Conference in Paris, where he called the next 25 years as the "period when the impacts of climate change posed a direct threat to human civilization." He welcomed the ratification of the Paris Agreement, which he called a very important step for Hungary, as "the Carpathian Basin is more affected by climate change than several other European countries," he said. In June 2016, Áder wrote a letter to the heads of state of the world's top ten carbon dioxide-emitting countries to persuade them to tighten their reduction targets. Jobbik politician Lajos Kepli accused Áder, as while he fights for the interests of environmental protection at the international level, he failed to criticize the Orbán government for their precluding domestic policy. "[Áder] sees no problem with the taxation on solar panels, he is not bothered by the arbitrary cessation of energy efficiency tenders [...]," Kepli argued.

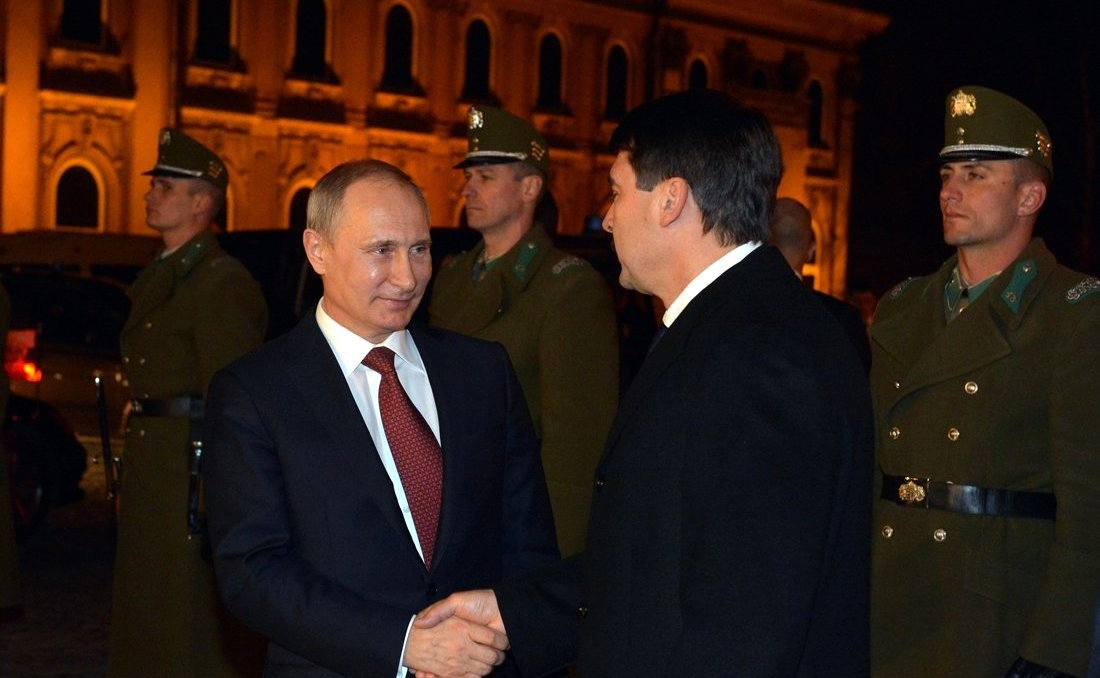
Áder and Russian President Vladimir Putin in February 2015

In contrast to his predecessor Schmitt, who during his presidency of almost two years did not send any bill which had been voted on by the National Assembly back for consideration by the legislature, nor submit any to the Constitutional Court for judicial review, Áder proved to be a counterweight to the Orbán government on a number of important issues. Beyond the withdrawal of election procedures bill in December 2012, Áder refused to sign the new land law which was intended to pass the right of management of national parks to the National Land Fund Managing Organization (NFA), in accordance with his environmental objectives. Áder also used his veto power in March 2016 on the controversial bill which would have declared public funds allocated to the foundations of the Hungarian National Bank (MNB) as "private funds". Left-wing liberal journalist Gábor Miklósi (Index) summarized Áder's presidency with that argument that the president remained silent on the really important matters and "his rare criticism does not hinder but legitimizes Hungary's increasingly authoritarian political system".

=== Second term ===
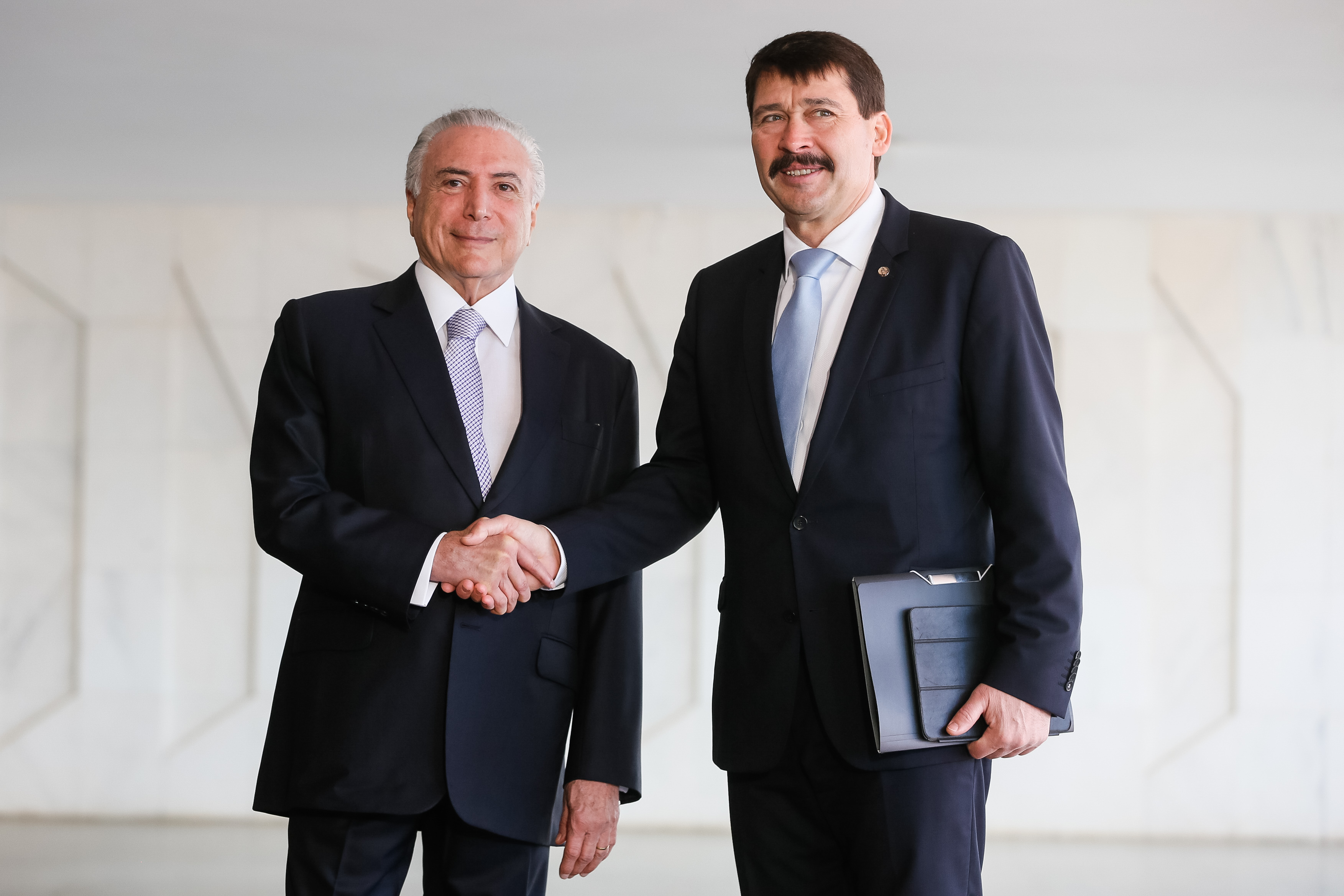
Áder with President of Brazil Michel Temer in 2018

Áder's rejection of electoral registration and reclassification of MNB public funds were serious political setbacks for Viktor Orbán, who, as a result, reportedly considered replacing Áder with a less independent candidate in the 2017 presidential election. In April 2016, for example, pro-government news portal Origo claimed that Áder's imminent dismissal was "almost certain." Then, in May 2016, MP György Rubovszky was recorded as saying, during a parliamentary committee session, that "Viktor [Orbán] would not allow it [Áder's reelection]." On 8 December 2016, opposition media outlet ATV claimed that Orbán was grooming Minister of Human Resources Zoltán Balog to succeed Áder. ATV added that Áder's neutrality during the October 2016 migrant quota referendum campaign had harmed the "relationship of trust" between him and Orbán.

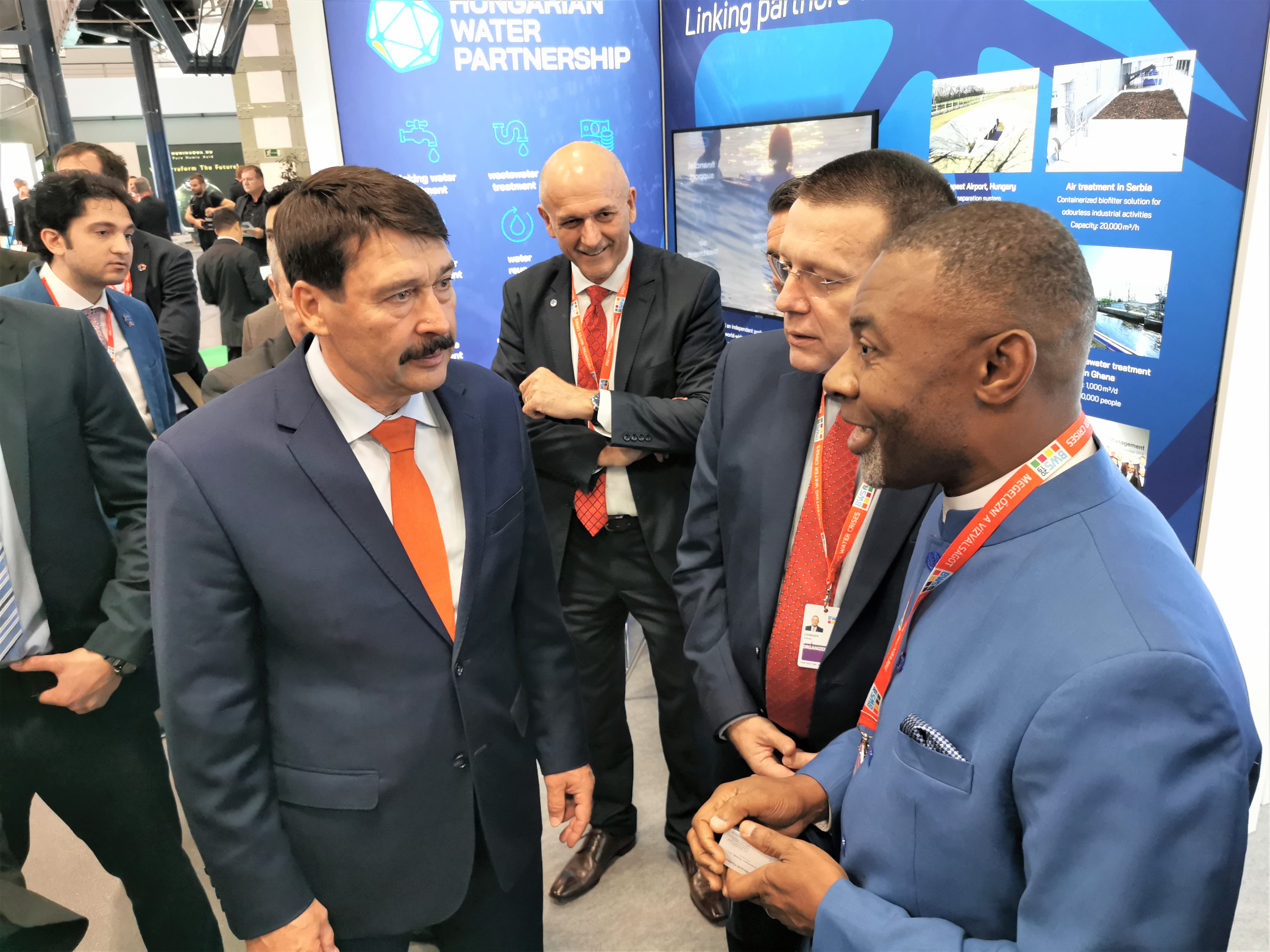
János Áder at Hungarian Water Partnership in October 2019

In contrast to ATV, Origo reported three days later that Áder would remain president. Origo added that "only" Áder would make the decision about his candidacy for reelection, but had asked for time to consider his candidacy. On 21 December, it was reported that Orbán had requested the party leadership to select Áder as the governing coalition's nominee for president. Parliamentary group leader Lajos Kósa officially announced Áder's nomination on the same day. On 29 December, Áder accepted the nomination, calling his presidential role a "constitutional service". An Index analysis argued that the government had not been able to find a suitable successor for Balog's ministry and that Áder had not actually caused any "big trouble" during his first term, since the president had supported the government's "most important" measures. Áder's re-election thus "did not represent a significant political risk" to Orbán.

Áder was re-elected for a second five-year term by the Hungarian parliament by a vote of 131–39 on 13 March 2017. His opponent was legal scholar László Majtényi, an independent candidate supported by a coalition of left-wing opposition parties. Áder thus became the second two-term post-communist head of state of Hungary (after Árpád Göncz, who served as President from 1990 to 2000). Áder took his presidential oath of office on 8 May 2017.

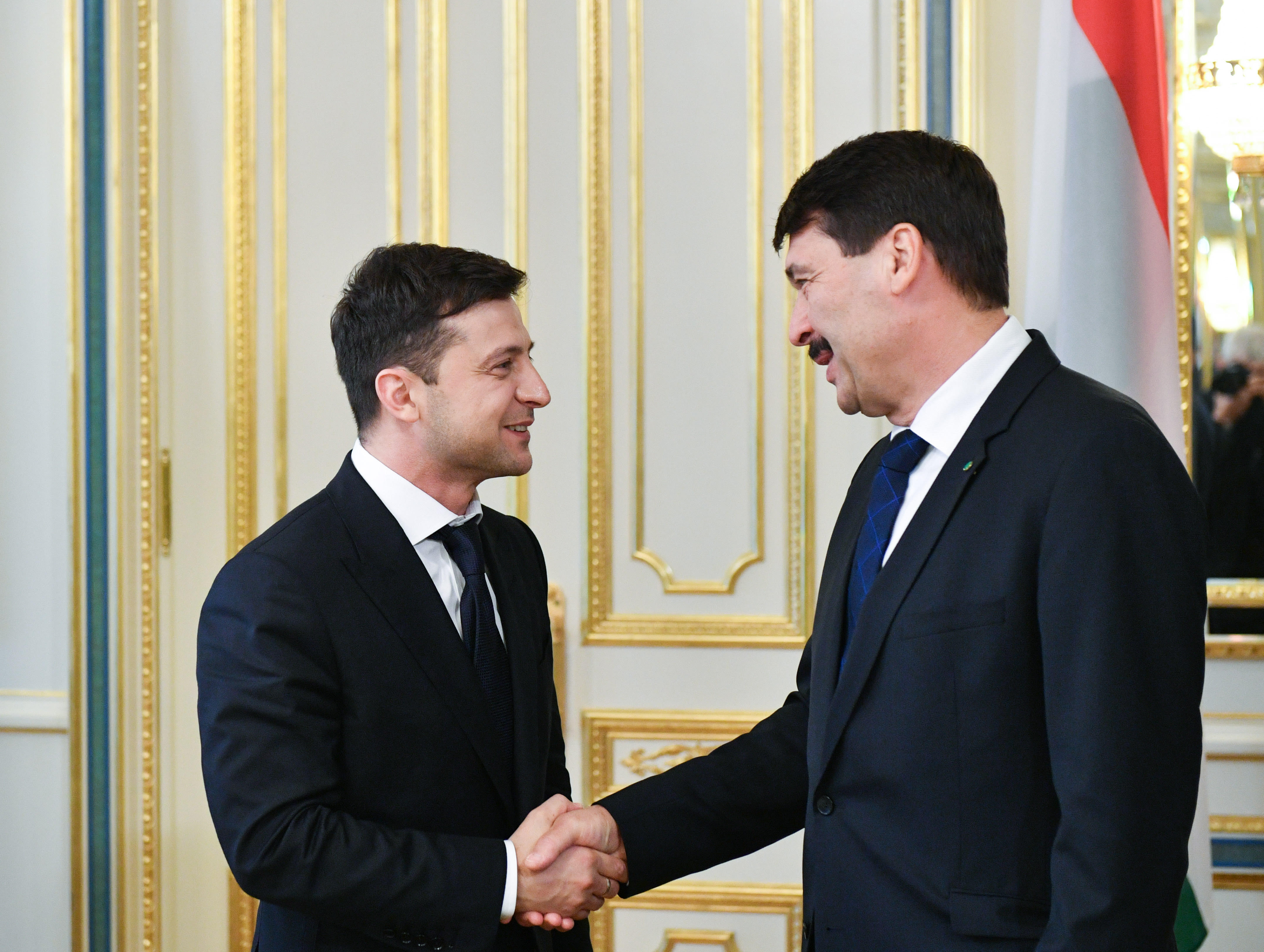
Áder with Volodymyr Zelenskyy during the latter's inauguration as President of Ukraine in May 2019

During the same period, Áder entered the national and international media spotlight for refusing to submit a government-sponsored revision to Act CCIV of 2011 on National Higher Education for constitutional review. The amendment, known domestically as lex CEU, impacted foreign-operating universities, including the Central European University (CEU). Áder signed the educational amendment into law on 10 April despite protest and criticism from both domestic and international activists, scholars, and academic institutions, claiming the amendment did not seem to conflict with the constitution or international treaties. Áder's decision sparked a protest in front of the Sándor Palace, while Wikipedia pages about Áder in several languages were vandalized.

The Hungarian parliament passed the law granting plenary power to the Government which authorizes it to override acts and to rule by decree to the extent that is "necessary and proportional" in order to "prevent, manage, and eradicate the epidemic and to avoid and mitigate its effects", on 30 March 2020. After promulgating the law, Áder announced that he had concluded that the time frame of the Government's authorization would be definite and its scope would be limited. Ursula von der Leyen, the President of the European Commission, stated that she was concerned about the Hungarian emergency measures and that it should be limited to what is necessary and Minister of State Michael Roth suggested that economic sanctions should be used against Hungary.

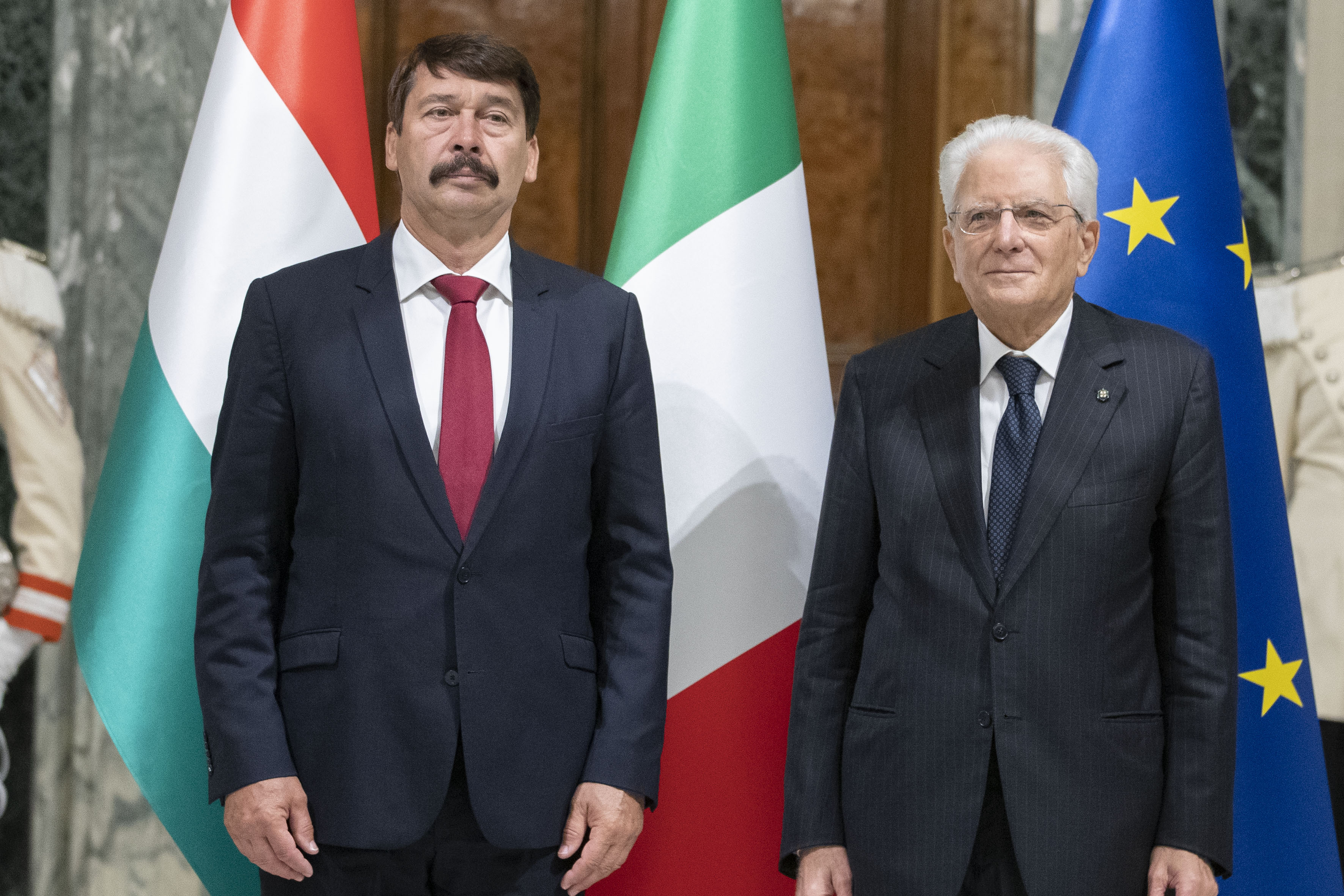
Áder with Italian President Sergio Mattarella in September 2021

In April 2021, President János Áder and First Lady Anita Herczeg established a charity foundation in order to financially support those orphaned children who lost their parents during the COVID-19 pandemic. According to Áder, "more than 600 children and 400 families" had been affected at the time of the announcement. Their foundation was named after Catholic priest and Righteous Among the Nations István Regőczi, who taught and cared for World War II orphans. Beside Áder and his wife – who made the first donation, altogether 5 million HUF (EUR 13,850) – clinical psychologist Emőke Bagdy and climate researcher Diana Ürge-Vorsatz became members of the board of trustees.

Investigate journal Direkt36 revealed in December 2021 that some of Áder's bodyguards formerly had been targeted with the Pegasus spyware in several months in 2019. Journalist Szabolcs Panyi concluded that "the most likely reason [of the wiretapping] was the conflict between the various law enforcement agencies, which took a bitter turn when the Counter Terrorism Centre (TEK) wanted to know the details of Áder's schedule." Accordingly, Áder and his staff were originally protected by TEK until 2015, but the president's confidence had been severely eroded towards the agency, because TEK passed on information about President János Áder's private schedule to Viktor Orbán, who then was well informed about his programs and all his meetings. Thereafter, Áder was protected by the newly established Presidential Guard, which operated within the Hungarian Police.

Áder was ineligible to run in the 2022 Hungarian presidential election due to term limits. He was succeeded by fellow Fidesz politician Katalin Novák, who was elected by 137 out of 199 MPs. According to an analysis of independent news portal Telex.hu, Áder did not become a counterweight to the Orbán governments with two-thirds majority; most of the cases (most of them were "indifferent" laws) he only complained about formal issues and not about the content. However, he did not object to the really significant laws (e.g. constitutional amendments, "lex CEU", "lex Soros", "overtime law", separation of research institutions from the MTA, "coronavirus law"). During his presidency, Áder did not speak on divisive issues and never confronted his former party in the ten years. After his retirement, Áder was granted a luxurious villa in Buda Hills and an €11,500 monthly pension.

== Family ==
Since 1984, Áder has been married to Anita Herczegh, who works as a judge. They have three daughters, Orsolya, Borbála, Júlia and a son, András.

János Áder has a sister, Annamária (born 1960), a biology and geography high school teacher, who married footballer and manager Gábor Pölöskei. She was appointed head of the Klebelsberg Institution Maintenance Centre (KLIK) on 1 March 2016.

He is a Roman Catholic.

Áder's father-in-law, Géza Herczegh, was a judge of the International Court of Justice at The Hague from 1993 to 2003.

== Honours and awards ==
=== Domestic ===
- Hungarian Order of Saint Stephen
- Grand Cross with Chain of the Hungarian Order of Merit

=== Foreign ===
- (Kingdom of the Two Sicilies) Two Sicilian Royal Family: Knight Grand Cross of the Two Sicilian Royal Sacred Military Constantinian Order of Saint George, Special Class
- Poland: Grand Cross of the Order of the White Eagle
- Ukraine: Order of Prince Yaroslav the Wise, 1st class

== Notes ==
Party political offices
Preceded by Zoltán Pokorni	President of Fidesz; 2002–2003	Succeeded by Viktor Orbán
Political offices
Preceded by Zoltán Gál	Speaker of the National Assembly; 1998–2002	Succeeded by Katalin Szili
Preceded by Pál Schmitt	President of Hungary; 2012–2022	Succeeded by Katalin Novák
