= Dorottya Rédai =

Hungarian LGBTQ activist

- Born: Hungary
- Occupations: Academic; LGBTQ+ activist
- Organization: Executive Director of Labrisz Lesbian Association
- Awards: GO Women We Love 2023, Time 100 2021

Dorottya Rédai is a Hungarian academic and LGBTQ+ activist who currently serves as the executive director of the Labrisz Lesbian Association. She has been described as a "leading figure in Hungarian human rights activism" and "a symbol of courage". She became internationally known for leading the project which created A Fairytale for Everyone, and was named to the Time 100 in 2021 for this effort.

== Biography ==
She first became interested in gender studies after observing how her brother received more privileges than her, and this crystallized during her final year of college when she took a gender studies course. She earned a MA in English and English Literature from the Eötvös Loránd University (ELTE), a MA in Gender Studies from the Central European University (CEU), and a PhD in Comparative Gender Studies from CEU, where she graduated in 2015. Her dissertation on sexuality in schools was later published in 2019 by Palgrave Macmillan. She has taught courses on gender and education at CEU and ELTE, and has also worked as a tutor and a researcher. However, her field, gender studies, was banned in Hungary in 2018.

She is best known for her work with the Labrisz Lesbian Association. She began working to support its school outreach program, Getting to Know LGBT People, in 2004, not long after coming out herself. They had published six other books, including biographies, a LGBTQI handbook for teachers, and a novelization of Labrisz's documentary Secret Years.

Her focus became coming up with tools to help inform younger children about these issues in an appropriate way. This became the project A Fairytale for Everyone, which involved retelling traditional fairytales in a diverse way, which she spearheaded and which was published in 2020. The book was subsequently published in at least 8 other languages and sold more than 30,000 copies, despite receiving criticisms from individuals including a political party leader, Dóra Dúró and Prime Minister Viktor Orbán. The book has continued being sold even after the ban of Getting to Know LGBT People. She has stated that the book has resulted in stronger homophobia than before, but also in stronger support for LGBT people than before from those who'd not spoken out.

She has been dubbed a "symbol of courage" and a "leading figure in Hungarian human rights activism". She has discussed the transition from being a private figure to speaking to journalists multiple times per week.

She also participated in Budapest Pride, headed by Viktória Radványi, in 2021, despite a government ban on the pride parade. In 2022, she called for voting against Orban, a regime she has dubbed "authoritarian and post-fascist", and against government initiatives she stated were homophobic. In 2024, she called for more collaboration between activists and academics. That same year, she published a chapter analyzing far-right populism and anti-gender movements on homophobia and transphobia.

She left academia, and a few years later became the Executive Director of Labrisz.

She was awarded the Emma Goldman Snowball Award in 2020. She was named to the Time 100 in 2021 for her leadership in A Fairytale For Everyone: her profile was written by MEP Terry Reintke. She was named to GO's Women We Love in 2023.
