= 2012 Hungarian presidential election =

- 2 May 2012

Needed to win: Two-thirds of all members of the National Assembly (first ballot) 385 MPs, 257 votes needed to win
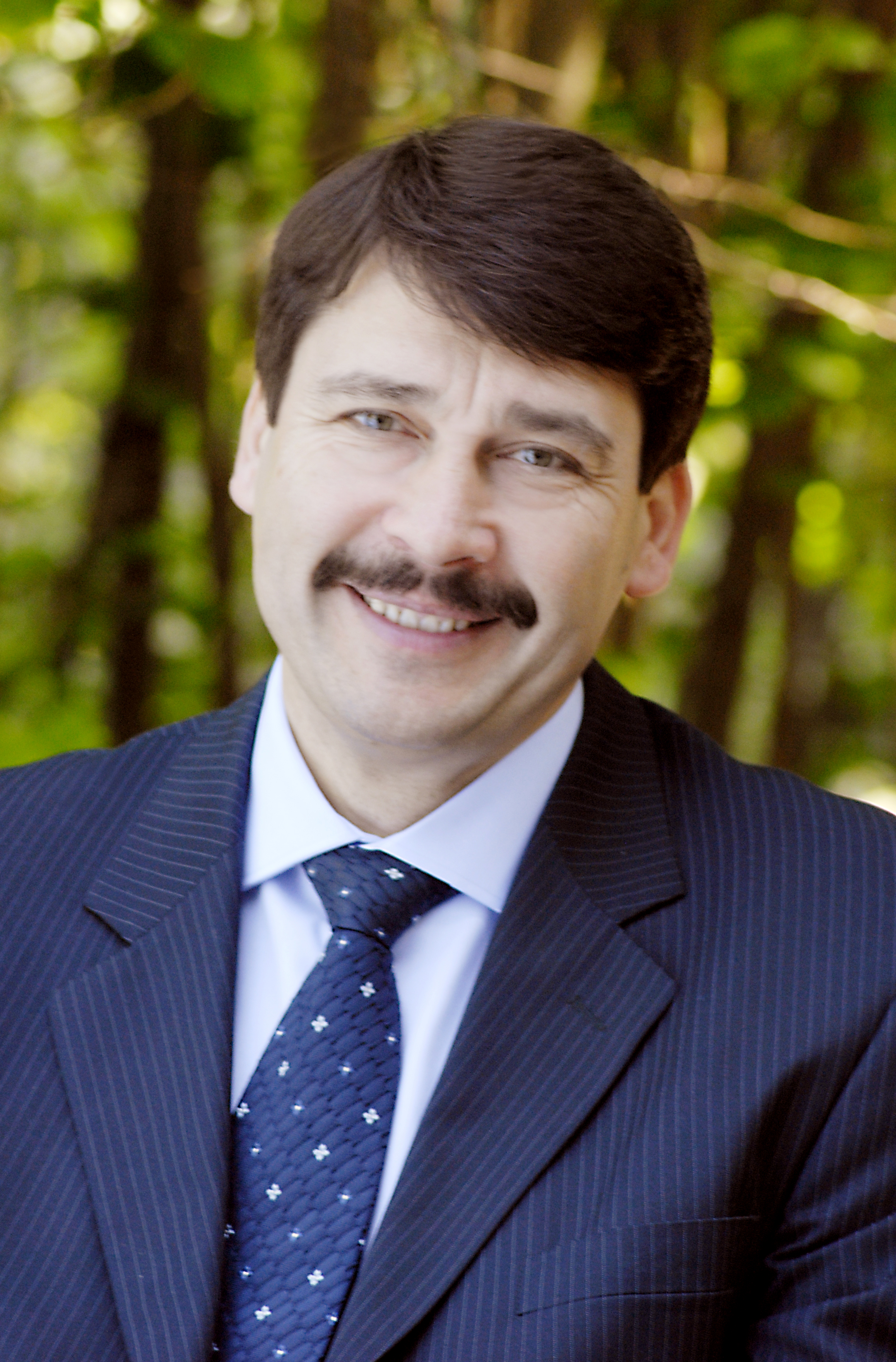

Nominee	János Áder	Against
Party	Fidesz
Alliance	Fidesz–KDNP
Electoral vote	262	40
Percentage	87.75%	13.25%
President before election
László Kövér
(acting)
Fidesz
Elected President
János Áder
Fidesz

An early indirect presidential election was held in Hungary on 2 May 2012, following the resignation of Pál Schmitt as President of Hungary on 2 April 2012. Former Speaker of the National Assembly János Áder was elected with two-third majority.

== Background ==
Pál Schmitt was elected head of state of Hungary in summer 2010, following the 2010 Hungarian parliamentary election in which Fidesz came out with an absolute majority of seats and PM Viktor Orbán nominated him.

As a result of an allegation of academic misconduct he was stripped by a legal session of the Senate of the SOTE of his doctorate degree on 29 March. On 2 April, Schmitt told Parliament he would resign as President saying that "under the Constitution, the President must represent the unity of the Hungarian nation. I have unfortunately become a symbol of division; I feel it is my duty to leave my position." Speaker of the National Assembly László Kövér then took over as acting president according to the Constitution of Hungary, which also mandates the National Assembly has 30 days to elect a new president. One of the five Deputy Speakers of the Parliament, Sándor Lezsák, was commissioned with exercising the Speaker's rights and responsibilities in the interim period.

== Candidates ==
The Hungarian Socialist Party, Politics Can Be Different and the Democratic Coalition agreed about the opposition parties' guarantees for having a meaningful say in the presidential election. The Socialist Party also submitted a bill to mandate a four-fifths majority in order to elect a new head of state instead of the current two-thirds majority so as to stymie Fidesz–KDNP's ability to unilaterally elect a new president without the opposition.

Jobbik nominated MEP Krisztina Morvai and former Minister of Defence Lajos Für as the party's candidates to the presidential position on 4 April. However, Für later announced that he would not accept the nomination.

Fidesz announced that will nominate MEP and Former Speaker of the House János Áder. Áder was criticised for his close relationship with Prime Minister Viktor Orbán on the grounds that he would not serve as a check on the power of the Prime Minister.

== Results ==
Candidate	Party	Votes	%
János Áder	Fidesz	262	86.75
Against Áder		40	13.25
Total		302	100.00
Valid votes		302	98.37
Invalid/blank votes		5	1.63
Total votes		307	100.00
Registered voters/turnout		385	79.74
Source: Politics.hu
