= Labrisz Lesbian Association =

- Labrisz Leszbikus Egyesület
- Abbreviation: Labrisz
- Formation: November 9, 1999; 26 years ago
- Type: NGO
- Headquarters: Budapest, Hungary
- Region served: Hungary
- Official language: Hungarian
- Executive Director: Dorottya Rédai
- Website: labrisz.hu

Labrisz Lesbian Association (Hungarian: Labrisz Leszbikus Egyesület) is an LGBTQ organisation based in Budapest, Hungary. Its purpose is making the lives and issues of lesbian, bisexual and transgender women more visible, along with seeking to aid these women with various cultural programs and discussion groups. Labrisz Lesbian Association is also a co-founders of the Rainbow Mission Foundation, which is mainly responsible for organizing the annual Budapest Pride festival.

== Name ==
The name 'Labrisz' is the Hungarian word for labrys, the ancient double-headed axe. Although it is most commonly understood to be a weapon as well as a crop harvesting tool, some claim that it was most emphatically not a weapon. It is also commonly used as a feminist and lesbian symbol around the world, associated with female empowerment.

== History ==
Labrisz was officially registered in November 1999, but had been unofficially been organizing events for three years beforehand. The group decided to register so they could form an official organizational committee and apply to be a member organization of the Astraea Lesbian Foundation for Justice. The group's constitution was closely based on that of the Háttér Society. After officially registering, the association took an office space at Gutenberg Square.

In its early days, Labrisz published a newletter, also called Labrisz, which they publicized through the gay magazine Mások. The newsletter continued to be published into the early 2000s.

== Activities ==
=== Budapest Pride ===
Labrisz is a co-founders of the Rainbow Mission Foundation that is responsible for organizing the Pride Festival each year in Hungary. Labris organizes female-focused programs (mostly workshops) for the festival.

=== Labrisz Evenings ===
These are monthly discussion groups for lesbian, bisexual and transgender women with the primary aim of breaking closet doors, reducing social isolation, and helping to develop self-acceptance and to build a community. Topics range from literary nights to practical questions such as love, dating, relationship issues to more theoretical ones like the representation of women in society.

=== LGBTQ History Month ===
Labrisz, together with the Háttér Society, began running LGBTQ History Month programming in February 2013.

In 2014, Labrisz hosted, among various other events, a carnival party where the Association's hobby band, Pink Csikk Para Pánik Zenekar, celebrated its 10th anniversary with a show. The party also featured a woman politician costume competition.

=== Lesbian Identities Festival ===
The association organized its first Lesbian Identities Festival (LIFT) in the fall of 2005. It was Hungary's first one-day lesbian cultural program with film screenings, workshops, literary events, a lesbian herstory exhibition (for more, see below) and a lesbian party. The festival, whose main purpose is dissolving stereotypes about lesbians and making lesbian lives more visible, is organized yearly since 2007. Since 2009 the timespan of the festival fluctuates between a week and three days.

=== Lesbian Herstory Archive ===
In 2008, the association started a lesbian "herstory" project, conducting interviews with lesbians above 45 (in which they talk about living as a lesbian before the change of regime in Hungary in 1989) in order to create the basis of an archive and an edited volume. Secret Years, a documentary based on 11 interviews, was shown in the 2009 LIFT Festival. The volume of interviews with the same title, containing 16 interviews, was published in Hungarian in 2011.

=== Queen of Spades Game Club ===
This is a monthly gathering where women can play card and board games with each other. The club is open for anyone so it is a great opportunity to see old friends and meet new people as well. Until 2014 the events were held at a gay-friendly bar in the heart of Budapest.

=== "Getting to Know LGBT People" educational programme ===
The main activity of this programme is having discussions with high school students and prospective teachers about LGBT people. The aim of the program is to foster an educational environment for students and teachers alike, where no one has to suffer from any form of harassment based on their gay, lesbian or bisexual orientation.

== Publications ==
The association has published a number of books relevant to the lives of lesbians in Hungarian.

- Lesbian Space (1999); a collection of essays about lesbian herstory, politics, feminism, identity, representation and coming out.
- Counterwinds: Lesbians in Fiction (2000); a literary anthology containing, among other content, the translated work of notable writers such as Jeanette Winterson, Dorothy Allison and Adrienne Rich.
- Már nem tabu - tanári kézikönyv a melegekről, leszbikusokról, biszexuálisokról, transzneműekről [Not a Taboo Anymore: A Manual for Teachers on Lesbians, Gays, Bisexuals and Transgenders] (in Hungarian). 2002.; a handbook for educators published with the Háttér Society.
  - Contains informational materials, activities to handle the question of homosexuality, writings about school times, a dictionary, recommended readings and films, and the contact information of LGBTQ organizations. Its content is being reviewed and updated as part of the "Getting to Know LGBT People" educational programme.
- Előhívott önarcképek - Leszbikus nők önéletrajzi írásai [Developed Self-Portraits: Lesbian Women’s Autobiographical Writings] (in Hungarian). 2003.; an autobiographical collection which includes letters, diaries and other autobiographical writings of lesbians from throughout history, including Vita Sackville-West, Virginia Woolf, Gertrude Stein, Marlene Dietrich, and Radclyffe Hall.
- Eltitkolt éve [Secret years] (in Hungarian). 2011.; a result of the association's herstory project; a volume of 16 interviews with middle-aged or older lesbians who talk about their lives before the change of regime in 1989.
- A Fairytale for Everyone. 2020.; collection of fairytales with LGBTQ characters; restricted by the Hungarian government in 2021 due to its content
