= László Majtényi =

László Majtényi (born 30 November 30, 1950) is a Hungarian jurist, university professor and doctor of the Hungarian Academy of Sciences (MTA). His field of research was initially the law of the sea, and later the institution of ombudsmen.

== Education ==
In 1975, he graduated from the Faculty of Law of the Eötvös Loránd University.

== Career ==
From 1995 to 2001 he was Data Protection Commissioner (Ombudsman), in 2008-2009 he was the Chairman of the National Radio and Television Board (ORTT). President of the Károly Eötvös Institute of Public Policy, established by the Soros Foundation. A leading candidate in the 2017 presidential election, he was defeated by János Áder in the second round.
