= Előd Novák =

Hungarian politician

Előd Novák MP
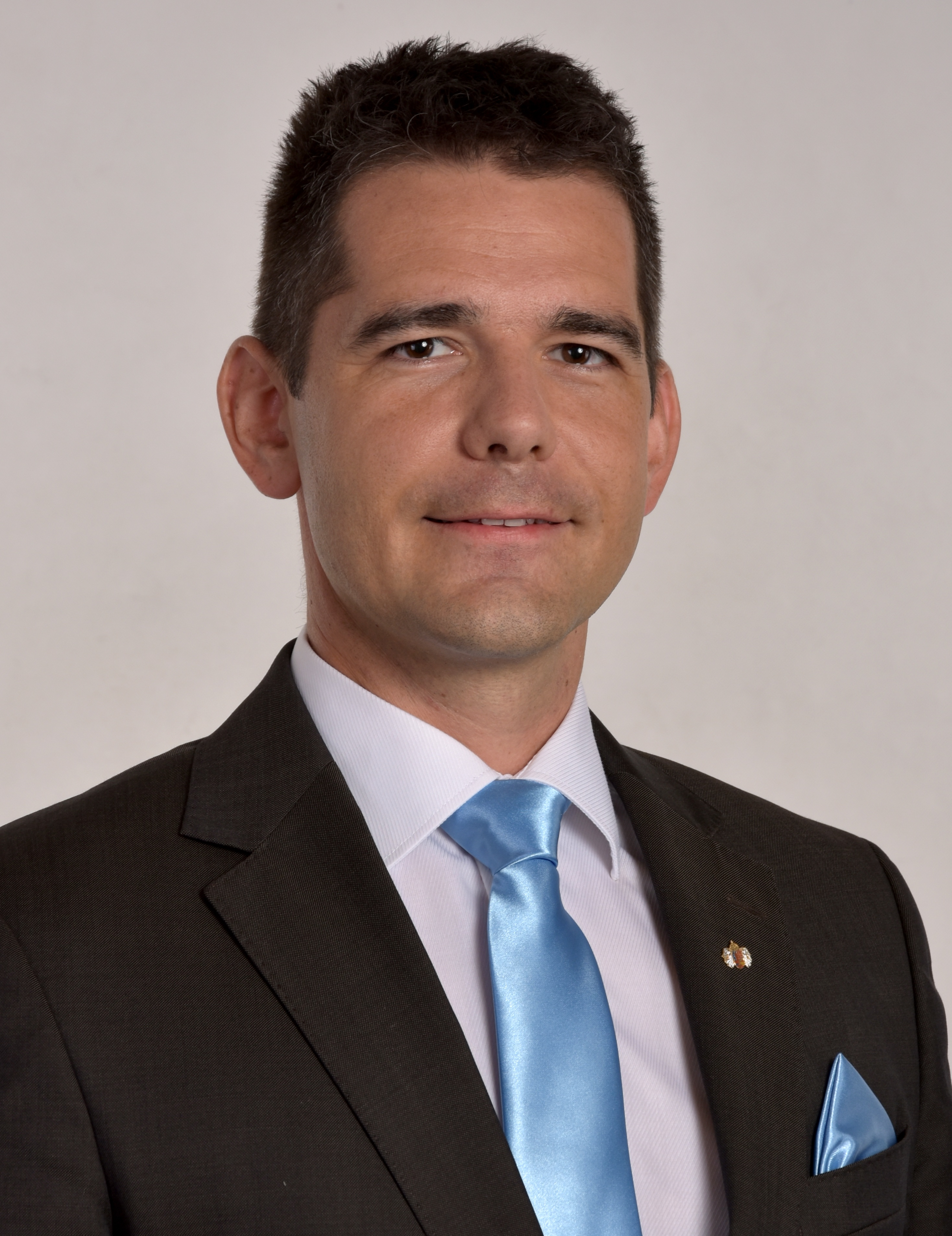
- Előd Novák in 2019

Member of the National Assembly
- Incumbent
- Assumed office 2 May 2022
- In office 14 May 2010 – 31 August 2016

Deputy Chairman of Jobbik
- In office 25 October 2009 – 29 May 2016

Personal details
- Born: April 25, 1980 (age 46) Budapest, Hungary
- Party: MHM (2018–present)
- Other political affiliations: MIÉP (1998–2003); Jobbik (2003–2018)
- Spouse: Dóra Dúró
- Children: 4
- Education: Pázmány Péter Catholic University
- Occupation: politician

Előd Novák (born 25 April 1980) is a Hungarian politician who serves as vice president of the far-right political party Our Homeland Movement.

He was formerly a deputy chairman of Jobbik, but left the party in June 2018, following Jobbik's move to the center-right. He formed Our Homeland along with László Toroczkai and several other former Jobbik members.

He is married to Dóra Dúró, another founder and vice president of Our Homeland Movement.

In the 2010 elections he was elected to the National Assembly of Hungary, representing Jobbik. He was a “local assistant” of Csanád Szegedi to the Member of the European Parliament in Brussels. Novák in five months received the salaries, although he is a eurosceptic who in January 2012 burned the European Union's flag at an anti-EU demonstration organized by Jobbik. In 2015, he was involved in a controversy as deputy leader over his remarks shared on social media where he suggested that the Romani population in Hungary was the biggest problem that the country was facing.

Előd Novák was forced by the party's parliamentary group to resign from his position as an MP in 2016. Now, he is a vocal critic of Jobbik's new policies.

On 8 June 2026, Novák attacked National Assembly member Mária Gurzó of the Tisza Party due to her Romanian ethnicity, stating that for Gurzó, "the interests of the Romanians in Hungary are above all else", subsequently asking her if she had Romanian citizenship. Gurzó declared in response that she had only one citizenship, expressed pride in her Romanian identity and compared the situation of the Romanians in Hungary to that of the Hungarian diaspora, being applauded in the parliament. Romanian Hungarian historian and politician Novák Csaba Zoltán stated it was "absurd" and "pathetic" that in 2026 someone would have to explain their ethnicity in the Hungarian parliament, especially due to the sensitiveness of the situation of the Hungarian diaspora.

== Personal life ==
He and Dúró have a daughter, Hunóra Kincső (2011) and three sons, Bottyán János (2013), Nimród Nándor (2014) and Zente Levente (2019).
