= András Balogh =

Hungarian historian and diplomat

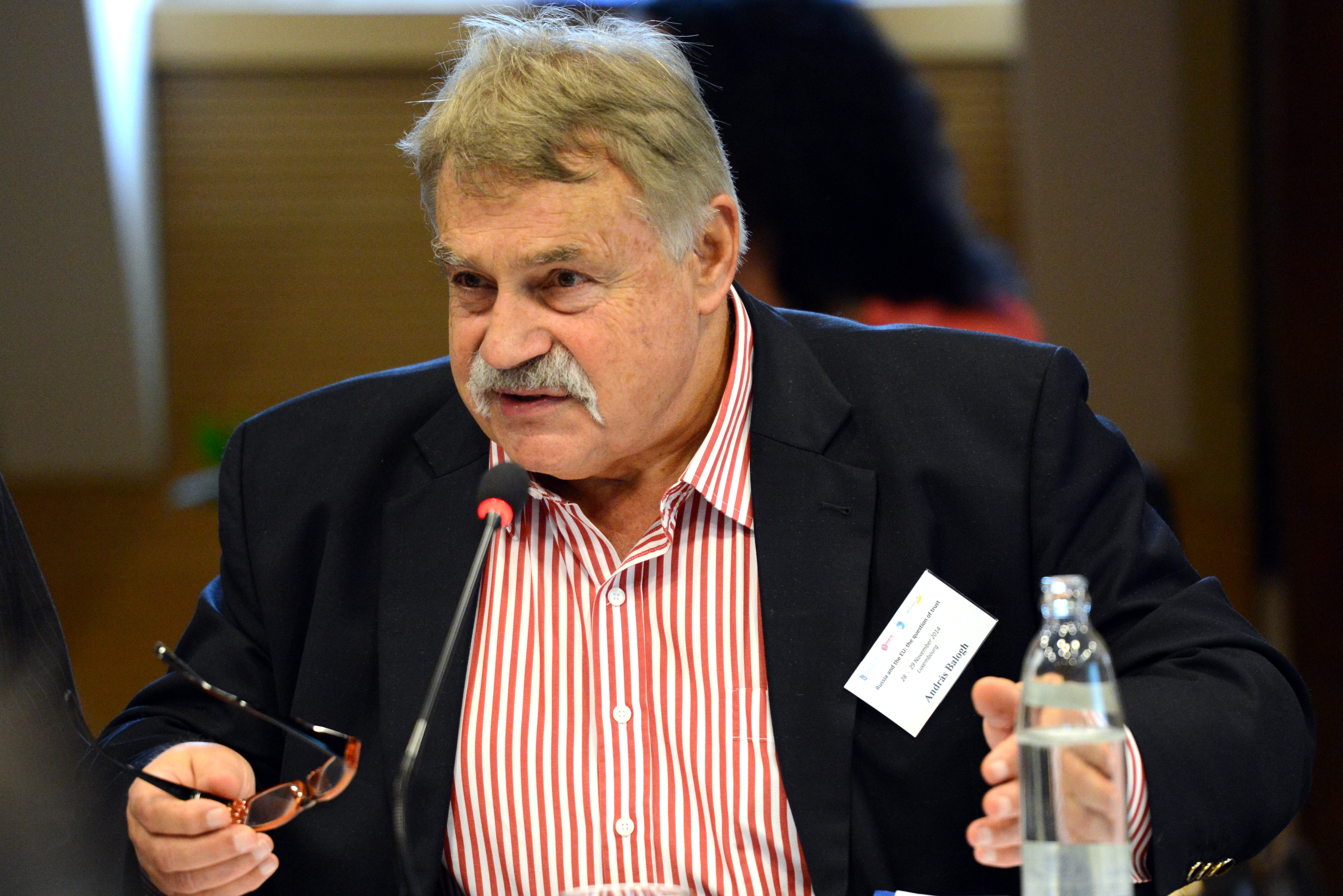
- Balogh in 2014

Hungarian Ambassador to Thailand
- In office 2005 – 20 December 2010
- Preceded by: János Vándor
- Succeeded by: Dénes Tomaj

Personal details
- Born: March 6, 1944 (age 82) Budapest, Kingdom of Hungary
- Party: MSZP
- Profession: diplomat, historian

András Balogh (born 6 March 1944) is a Hungarian historian, diplomat, and former ambassador to Thailand. His party, the Hungarian Socialist Party (MSZP) nominated him to the position of President of Hungary in 2010. During a parliamental election the Fidesz-Christian Democratic People's Party's candidate Pál Schmitt was elected by an overwhelming majority.

== Publications ==
- Társadalom és politika a gyarmati Indiában (1979)
- A gyarmati rendszer története 1870–1955 (1980)
- A Political History of National Liberation Movement in Asia and Africa 1914–1985 (1988)
- Nemzet és történelem Indiában (1988)
- A nemzeti kisebbség és a nemzetközi biztonság (1994)
- A magyar külpolitika prioritásai (1996)
- Integráció és nemzeti érdek (1998)
- Világpolitikai átrendeződés szeptember 11-e után (2001)
- Nemzet és nacionalizmus (co-author, 2002)

Diplomatic posts
Preceded by József Oláh	Hungarian Ambassador to India; 1988–1992	Succeeded by László Várkonyi
Preceded by János Vándor	Hungarian Ambassador to Thailand; 2005–2010	Succeeded by Dénes Tomaj
