= Dóra Dúró =

Hungarian politician (born 1987)

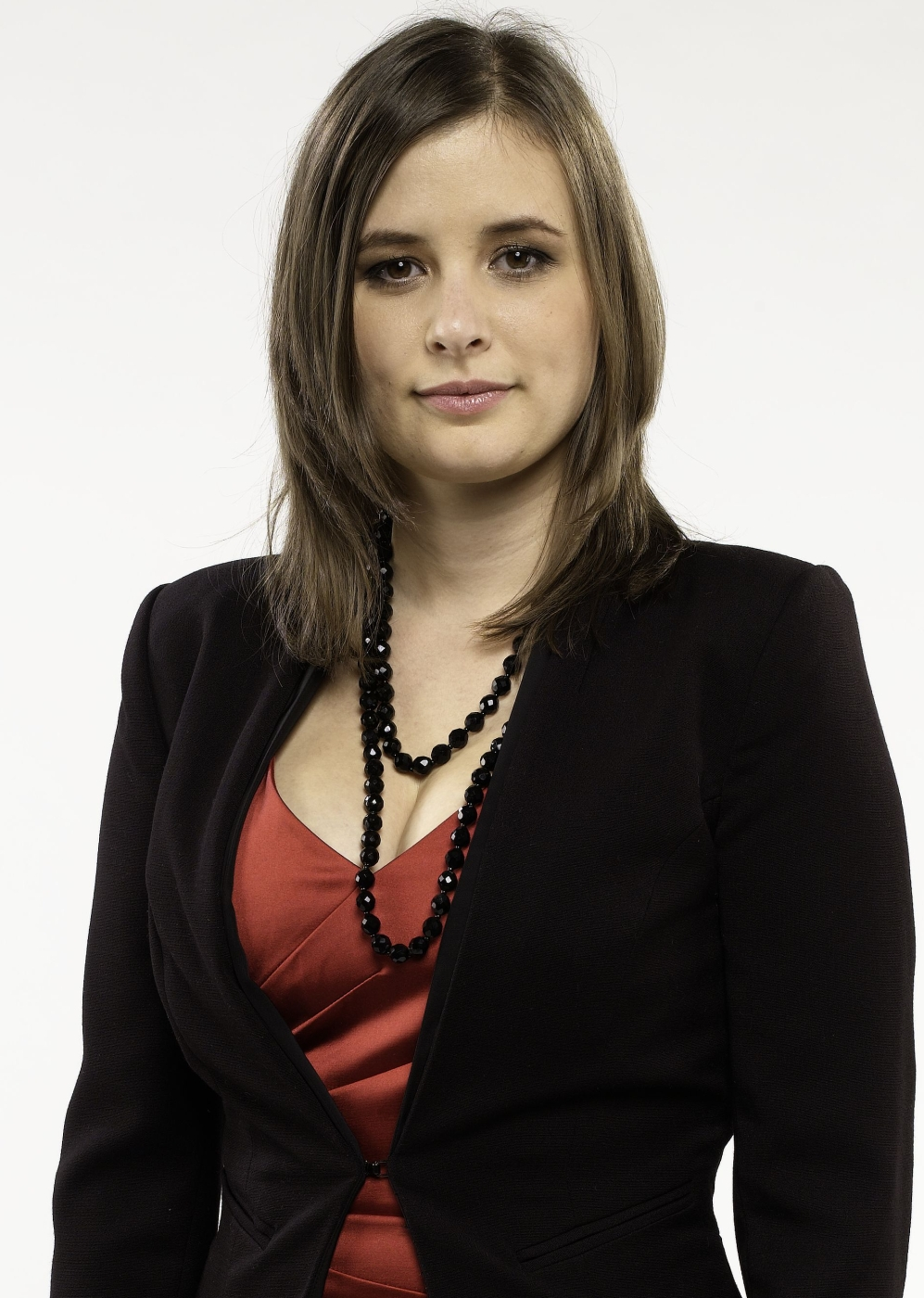
- Dúró in 2015

Member of the National Assembly
- Incumbent
- Assumed office 14 May 2010

Personal details
- Born: 5 March 1987 (age 39) Szentes, Hungary
- Party: MHM (2018–present)
- Other political affiliations: Jobbik (2005–2018)
- Spouse: Előd Novák
- Children: 4
- Education: Eötvös Loránd University
- Occupation: Politician

Dóra Dúró (born 5 March 1987) is a Hungarian politician who is a member of the National Assembly since 2010. A former member of Jobbik, she later joined the Our Homeland Movement.

== Early life and political career ==
Dúró was born in Szentes on 5 March 1987. She entered politics with Jobbik in 2005. In the 2010 Hungarian parliamentary election, she was elected to the National Assembly. Assuming office at the age of 23, she was the youngest member of the National Assembly until 2018. She also served as spokesperson of the far-right nationalist political party Jobbik. In 2018, after her expulsion from Jobbik, Dúró joined László Toroczkai's new party Our Home Movement and became the party's single MP.

In September 2020, Dúró said that the book titled Meseország mindenkié (Fairytaleland Is for Everyone) is "homosexual propaganda". She tore out sheets and then shredded them in a paper shredder. Many public figures criticized her actions, and the Association of Hungarian Publishers and Distributors (Magyar Könyvkiadók és Könyvterjesztők Egyesülése) stated in a communication that this act was in "communion with the legacy of Nazi bookburners and communist book shreds". Later in May 2025, Dúró renounced her parliamentary immunity after being sued for vandalizing a maternity poster. She did it again in March 2026, after being interrogated by police for blocking a road during a protest against a battery factory.

== Personal life ==
In 2008, Dúró married Előd Novák, a fellow politician and the former deputy leader of Jobbik, in the Church of Our Lady of the Hungarians in Gellért Hill Cave. They have a daughter (Hunóra Kincső) and three sons (Bottyán János, Nimród Nándor, and Zente Levente).

Honorary titles
Preceded by László Nagy	Youngest sitting member of Parliament; 2010–2018	Succeeded by Péter Ungár
Preceded by N/A	Member of the National Assembly; 2010–present	Succeeded by Incumbent
