= Emőke Bagdy =

Hungarian psychologist

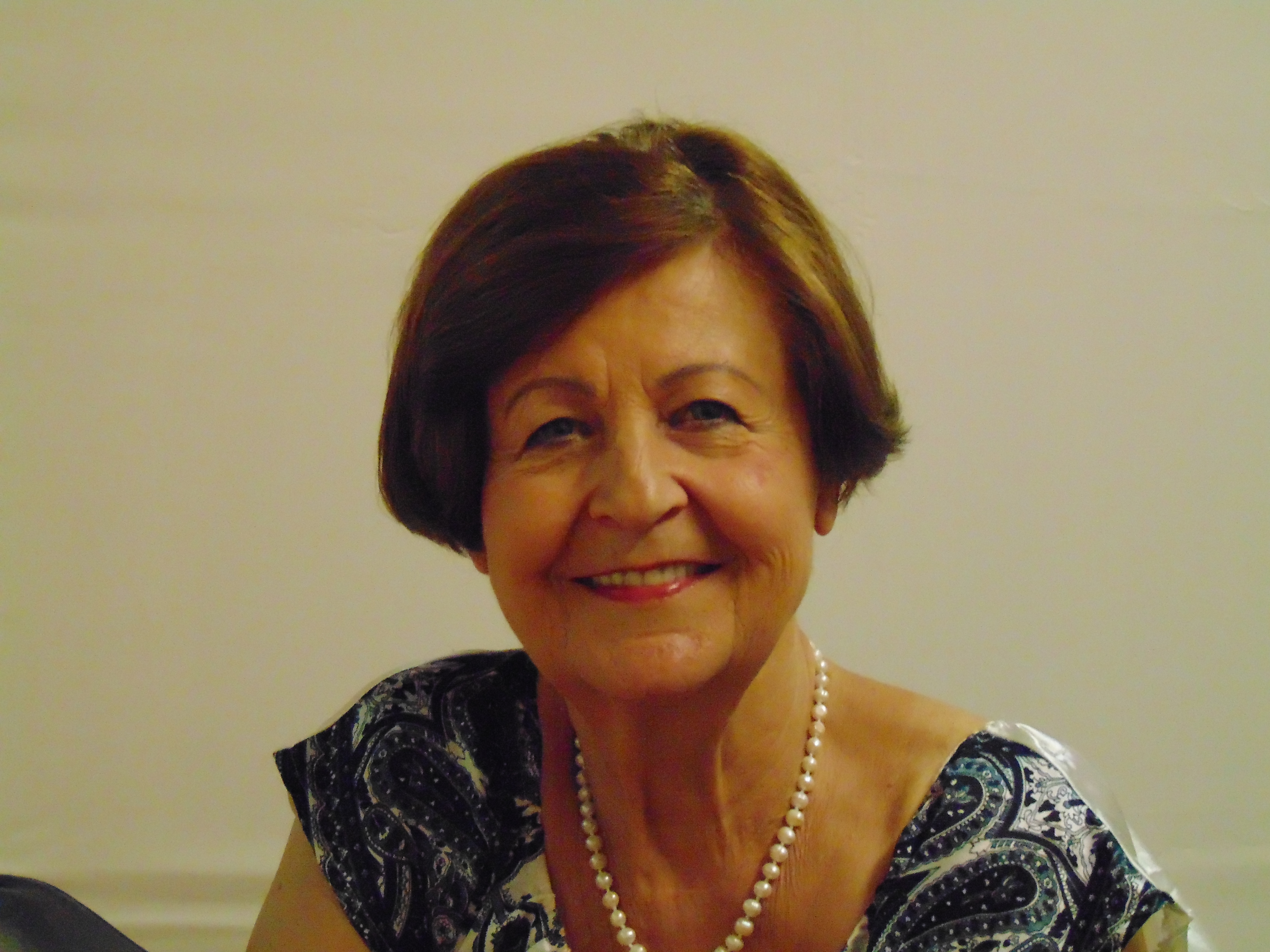
- Born: August 18, 1941 (age 85); Tiszafüred, Hungary
- Education: Eötvös Loránd University (ELTE)
- Known for: Psychology
- Spouse: Gyula Császár
- Children: Noémi Császár-Nagy; Zsolt Császár
- Awards: Order of Merit of the Republic of Hungary, Officer's Cross (civil), 2013; Prima Primissima Award, 2013
- Scientific career
- Fields: Psychotherapy; Clinical supervision; Health psychology; Clinical psychology
- Workplaces: Károli Gáspár University of the Reformed Church in Hungary (KRE); National Institute of Psychiatry and Neurology
- Website: website in Hungarian

Emőke Bagdy (Hungarian: [ˈɛmø:kɛ ˈbɒgdi]; born 18 August 1941) is a Hungarian clinical psychologist, psychotherapist, clinical supervisor, professor emerita at the Károli Gáspár University of the Reformed Church in Hungary (KRE), and former director of the National Institute of Psychiatry and Neurology. Her research, books, papers and talks focus on psychotherapy, health psychology and foundational problems of clinical psychology and clinical supervision.

== Biography and career ==
She was born on 18 August 1941 in Tiszafüred, Hungary. She took M.A. degree in Psychology in 1968 at the Eötvös Loránd University in Budapest.

From 1968 until 2001, she acted as the director of the National Institute of Psychiatry and Neurology.

In 1982, she was awarded He took candidate (C.Sc.) degree in Psychology.

In 1995, she habilitated at the Lajos Kossuth University and then she received the title of university (full) professor at the Imre Haynal Medical University in 1996.

Her working papers were issued in prestigious professional research scientific journals, and several books and numerous scientific articles were published.

Her main fields of interest are in the personality development methods in the context of education and professional socialization, mental health education and counselling, test application in clinical psychology and effectiveness of psychotherapy.

== Family ==
Her father, István Bagdy was a pastor of the Reformed Church in Hungary. Her mother was Julianna Fóris. In 1961 she married Gyula Császár, who worked as a psychiatrist, and she gave birth to twins, a daughter named Noémi Császár-Nagy and a son named Zsolt Császár in 1969.

Her son Zsolt was murdered in Phoenix, Arizona on October 25, 2023.

== Awards and honours ==
- 2013 Prima Primissima Award

== Selected works ==
=== Books ===
- Családi szocializáció és személyiségzavarok (Family Socialization and Personality Disorders), Tankönyvkiadó, Bp. 1977.
- Relaxációs módszerek, Medicina kiadó, Bp. 1978.
- Az MMPI próba elmélet és alkalmazás. Akadémia kiadó, Bp. 1985.
- Személyiségfejlesztő módszerek az iskolában (personality development in the school context). Tankönyvkiadó, Bp. 1986.
- La relaxation: „ Approche par le Corps de l’ Unite de la Personne”. Série Introspection 1. Budapest, Paris, 1995.
- Művészetek, szimbólumok terápiák. Pszüchagogosz, Bp. 1995.
- A pedagógus hivatásszemélyisége. KLTE Egyetemi kiadó, Debrecen 1997.
- Bagdy E., Mirnics Zs., Baktay G.: Pár- és családi kapcsolatok vizsgálata, HEFOP Digitális tankönyv, Budapest, 2006.
- Hogyan lehetnénk boldogabbak? Kulcslyuk Kiadó, Buapest, 2010.
- Bagdy Emőke – Pap János:Ma még nem nevettem! Kulcslyuk Kiadó, Budapest, 2011. Bagdy Emőke - Mirnics Zsuzsanna – Nyitrai Erika (szerk.): Transzperszonális pszichológia és pszichoterápia. Kulcslyuk Kiadó, Budapest, 2011.
- Utak önmagunkhoz. Kulcslyuk Kiadó, Budapest, 2012.
- Pszichofitness. Kacagás, kocogás, lazítás. Károli Gáspár Református Egyetem-L’Harmattan Kiadó, Budapest, 2013.
- Álmok, szimbólumok, terápiák. Kulcslyuk KiIadó, Budapest, 2013.
- Bagdy Emőke - Kövi Zsuzsanna- Mirnics Zsuzsanna: Fény és árnyék: a tehetségerők felszabadítása (Kiemelkedően tehetséges fiatalok-fejlesztése) Kutatási zárótanulmány- kötet Támop-3.4.5-12-2012-0001 azonosító számú „Tehetség-hidak program” keretében ”Kiemelt tehetségek támogatása, 8. sz. alprojekt, pilot study. Budapest, 2014.
- Bagdy Emőke - Kövi Zsuzsanna - Mirnics Zsuzsanna: A tehetség kibontakozása. Helikon, Budapest 2014.
- Pszichofitness. Hangoskönyv. Kossuth Kiadó, Budapest, 2014.
- A személyiség titkai. Helikon Kiadó, Budapest, 2014.
- Relaxáció, megnyugvás, belső béke. Kulcslyuk Kiadó, Budapest, 2014.
- Stresszkezelés és relaxáció a testnevelésben. Diáksport Szövetség, Budapest, 2015.
- Bagdy, Emőke: Önismeret, önazonosság, önmegvalósítás, 70 p. (2018)

=== Papers ===
- Bagdy, Emőke: A szeretet egységesítő hatalma: Bevezető gondolatok az emlékkötethez, In: Bagdy, Emőke (szerk.): A szeretet teológusa. Emlékezés Gyökössy Endrére, az első magyar pasztorálpszichológusra halálának 20. évfordulóján, Budapest, Animula.(2017) pp. 5–10., 6 p.
- Bagdy, Emőke: Állapotkép, szimbolikus műalkotás a pszichoterápiában, In: Németh, Marietta; Stiblár, Erika (szerk.): Életelvűség és jövőre irányultság a relaxációs és szimbólumterápiákban. Testtől lélekig Magyar Relaxációs és Szimbólumterápiás Egyesület tematikus lapja a VI. Nemzetközi Kongresszus előadásai alapján, Kaposvár, Magyar Relaxációs és Szimbólumterápiás Egyesület, (2017) pp. 59–65., 7 p.
- Bagdy, Emőke: Minden a fejben dől el!, In: Bagdy, Emőke; Buda, László; Kádár, Annamária; Pál, Ferenc - Fejben dől el? Ami rajtunk múlik és ami nem, Budapest, Kulcslyuk Kiadó, (2017) pp. 75–112., 38 p.
