= Pál Schmitt =

President of Hungary from 2010 to 2012

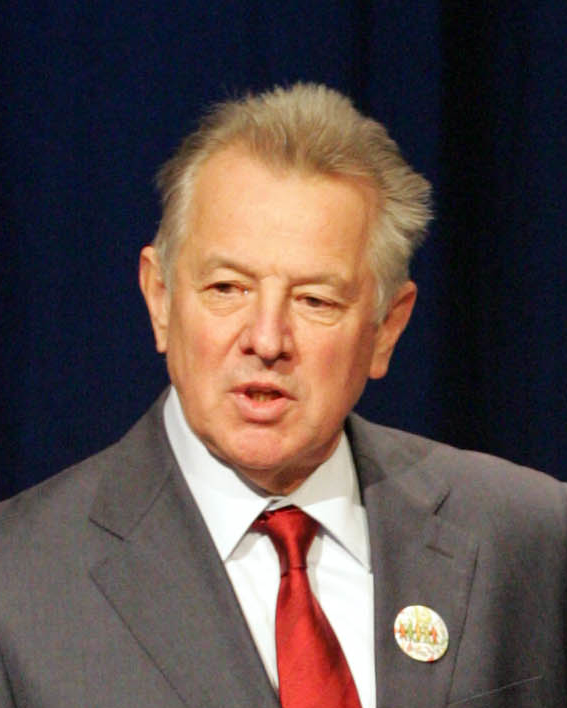
- Schmitt in 2011

President of Hungary
- In office 6 August 2010 – 2 April 2012
- Prime Minister: Viktor Orbán
- Preceded by: László Sólyom
- Succeeded by: János Áder (Note: László Kövér served as acting president between Schmitt's resignation and Áder's election.)

Speaker of the National Assembly
- In office 14 May 2010 – 5 August 2010
- Preceded by: Béla Katona
- Succeeded by: László Kövér

Vice-President of the European Parliament
- In office 14 July 2009 – 13 May 2010
- President: Jerzy Buzek
- Preceded by: Manuel António dos Santos
- Succeeded by: László Tőkés

Member of the National Assembly
- In office 14 May 2010 – 5 August 2010

Member of the European Parliament for Hungary
- In office 20 July 2004 – 13 May 2010

Personal details
- Born: 13 May 1942 (age 84) Budapest, Kingdom of Hungary
- Party: Fidesz (2003–present)
- Spouse: Katalin Makray (m. 1966)
- Children: 3, including Petra
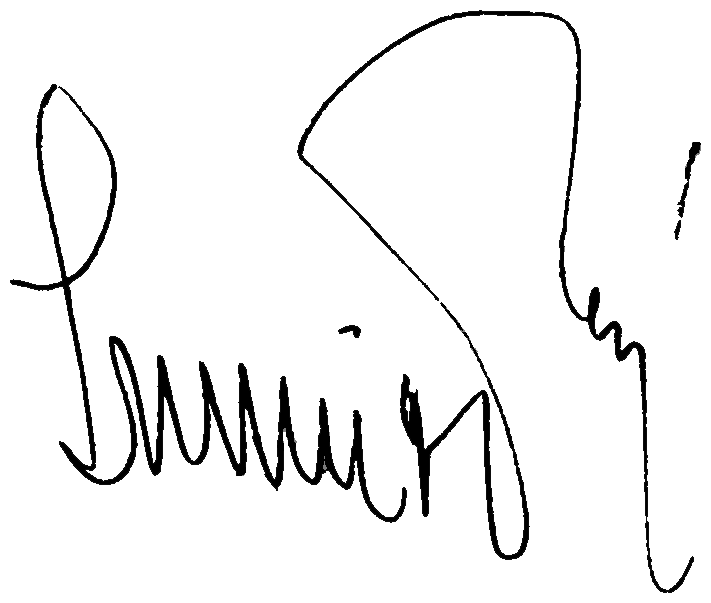
- Signature

Olympic medal record

Men's fencing

Representing Hungary
Gold medal – first place	1968 Mexico City	Team Épée
Gold medal – first place	1972 Munich	Team Épée

Pál Schmitt (Note: Hungarian pronunciation: [ˈpaːl ˈʃmitː]) (born 13 May 1942) is a Hungarian Olympic fencer and politician who served as president of Hungary from 2010 until his resignation in 2012, following his academic misconduct controversy.

Schmitt was a successful fencer in his youth, winning two gold medals at two Summer Olympic Games.

Later, he served as an ambassador during the 1990s and was a Vice-President of the European Parliament from 2009 to 2010.

After briefly serving as Speaker of the National Assembly of Hungary in 2010, Schmitt was elected president of Hungary in a 263 to 59 vote in the National Assembly. He was sworn in as president on 6 August 2010. On 2 April 2012, Schmitt announced to the Hungarian Parliament his resignation as president, following the outbreak of a controversy surrounding his 1992 doctoral dissertation.

== Personal life ==
Born on 13 May 1942 in Budapest to a middle-class family, he graduated from high school in 1960 and later studied domestic trade at Karl Marx University of Economics, from which he graduated in 1965. He met his wife, Katalin Makray, an Olympic artistic gymnast, at a training camp.

== Sporting career ==
Schmitt started a successful fencing career in 1955 competing for MTK-VM. After winning two Hungarian Championship titles in individual competitions he participated as part of the Hungarian National Fencing Team 130 times between 1965 and 1977. He won the team épée gold medal at the 1968 and 1972 Summer Olympics. He also won team and individual World Championships in fencing, and collected several second and third-place finishes until his active career ended in 1977. He later became the Chief of Protocol of the International Olympic Committee (IOC) and presided over the World Olympians Association between 1999 and 2007.

== Political career ==
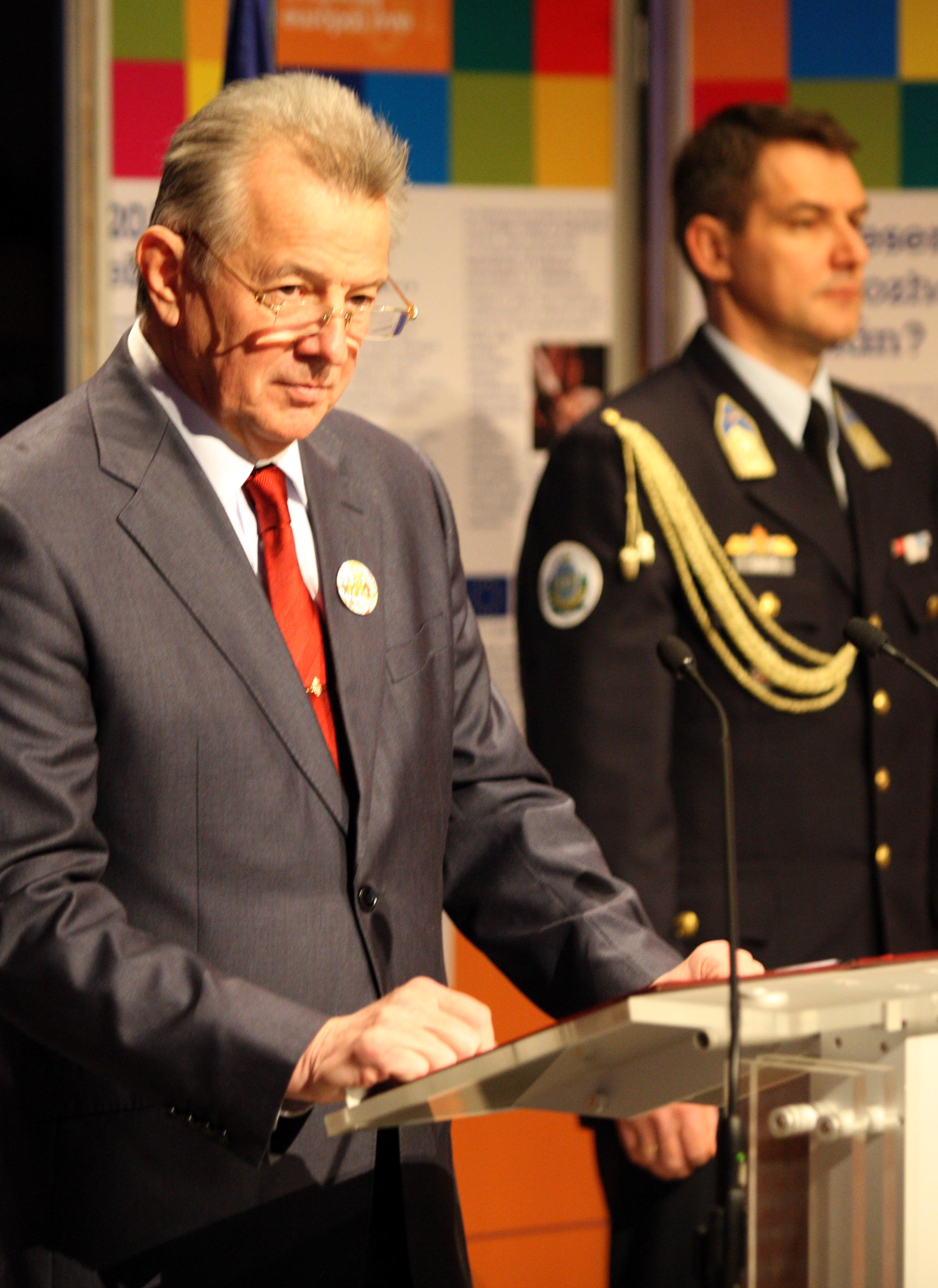
Pál Schmitt in 2011

Between 1983 and 1989, Schmitt was the general secretary of the Hungarian Olympic Committee and under-secretary of sports between 1981 and 1990. In 1989 after the End of Communism in Hungary he became president of the Hungarian Olympic Committee. He later became a diplomat, serving as Hungary's ambassador to Spain (1993–1997) and Switzerland (1999–2002). While in Spain he was also accredited to Andorra from 1995.

In 2002 he ran for the position of mayor of Budapest, but his independent candidacy also supported by Fidesz was unsuccessful. In 2003, he became a deputy president of Fidesz. He led the party list of Fidesz in the 2009 European elections in Hungary and was elected as a Member of the European Parliament with the Fidesz – Hungarian Civic Union, to the Bureau of the European People's Party and was vice-chair of the European Parliament's Committee on Culture and Education.

Schmitt chaired the Delegation to the EU–Croatia Joint Parliamentary Committee. On 14 July 2009 he was elected one of the 14 Vice-Presidents of the European Parliament. He became the Speaker of the National Assembly of Hungary after the Hungarian parliamentary election in 2010.

== President of Hungary (2010-2012) ==
In the 2010 Hungarian presidential election, Schmitt was elected President of Hungary by the National Assembly, for a term commencing on 6 August. He succeeded László Sólyom. He was elected with the support of the Fidesz and Christian Democratic People's (KDNP) parties, receiving 263 out of 322 votes. András Balogh of the Socialist Party received 59 votes.

Schmitt had been the deputy president of Fidesz and the speaker of the Hungarian Parliament. From the first free elections in 1990, the nominating party has typically picked one of its high-ranking members for president: for example the SZDSZ nominated Árpád Göncz, who was a founding member of the Alliance of Free Democrats (SZDSZ). The previous MSZP government's nominee was Katalin Szili, an MSZP member who was the then speaker of the Hungarian Parliament. Schmitt signaled a positive relationship with the Fidesz-KDNP government, saying: "In the current situation, when we undertake rebuilding the country economically, socially and morally, it is imperative that the president get along with the prime minister, as well as all leaders and government members." Schmitt said he did not intend to take an obstructionist stance towards the government, and sought a more active role in the political process such as the drafting of the country's new constitution. After taking office, Schmitt resigned all posts and offices previously held. Soon after his election Schmitt came under heavy attack from some opposition parties, that refused to attend the presidential inauguration, citing high costs and a late invitation.

Drafting of a new constitution began in 2010, and was finalized by 11 April 2011, being adopted by Parliament on 18 April. Schmitt signed the new constitution into law on 25 April and it went into effect on 1 January 2012.

As a supporter of the second cabinet of Viktor Orbán, already it was probable before his appointment that the presidential position is his reversioner. This confirmed that he proclaimed it at the time of the starting of his presidential activity, he wants to be "man of the people", and would like to favour and help the current government's work.

He created a sensation by personally identifying himself with the government's politics repeatedly in an interview with Time on 15 October 2010. In particular, the subject of the last sentence was "we, the government." The interview in its entirety can be found on the website of the Office of the President.

In November 2010, during a presidential speech he declared one of his major goals to be the preservation and fostering of the Hungarian language and stressed that this would be made compulsory by law. However, after this speech the website of the Office of the President published statements that were full of grammatical and stylistic errors and were ridiculed by the general public.

By 31 December 2010, Schmitt had signed nearly one hundred bills which had been voted on by the National Assembly; he did not send any back for consideration by the parliament, nor submit any to the Constitutional Court for judicial review.

=== Academic misconduct and resignation ===
In 1992 Pál Schmitt defended his dissertation for a doctor of philosophy degree summa cum laude at the Testnevelési Egyetem (University of Physical Education). In the year 2000, this institution was merged into Budapest's Semmelweis University to become one of its Faculties. On 11 January 2012, the website of the Hungarian magazine Heti Világgazdaság accused Schmitt of plagiarizing the work of a Bulgarian sport expert in his doctoral dissertation. Nikolay Georgiev's Analyse du programme olympique (des Jeux d’Olympiade) had been finished in 1987, and Schmitt's dissertation, completed in 1992, appears to be almost entirely a translation of this work. The accusation was denied by the Office of the President, which explained that Schmitt and Georgiev were friends and had worked together, from the same sources. Additional plagiarized sources, including 17 pages written by the German sport sociologist Klaus Heinemann, were identified later. Semmelweis University announced that a fact-finding committee would investigate the matter. The fact-finding committee's report, issued on 27 March, confirmed the plagiarism (word-by-word translations of "unusually large extent"), but blamed the Testnevelési Egyetem for not revealing the copied sources, and fell short of putting any blame on Schmitt ("the author may have thought that his dissertation satisfied the requirements"). However, a minority report was issued by the single non-faculty member of the committee, which called for the revocation of Schmitt's doctoral degree. On 29 March 2012 the Senate of Semmelweis University decided to revoke the degree.

On 2 April 2012 Schmitt announced his resignation as president, saying that he felt the plagiarism debate had divided the country. He reiterated that his conscience was clear, vowed that he would complete a PhD program, and threatened to launch a lawsuit against Semmelweis University. On 15 May 2013, Schmitt formally surrendered his doctorate after an academic remedy committee declared that his thesis did not meet the criteria, either in terms of content or formal requirements.

On 22 March 2014, Schmitt said in a short interview that he had given up his plans for graduating as a PhD, but instead would write a monograph on the effects of sports on the environment and sustainable development, which would have been the theme of the promised degree thesis.

== After presidency ==
In October 2015, Schmitt was appointed chairman at the first meeting of the EU's Sports Diplomacy Advisory Group, which was established by the Hungarian European Commissioner for Education, Culture, Youth and Sport, Tibor Navracsics.

In January 2016, Schmitt was appointed Chairman of the Budapest 2024 Summer Olympic and Paralympic Games Bid Committee. The committee was nicknamed "the Guardians of the Olympic Bid", as Schmitt stated that it is a decisive step in Hungary's bid to host the 2024 Summer Olympics and 2024 Summer Paralympics. The committee was put together in order to promote efforts inside and outside of Hungary and it is made up of 23 members from various sport, business and public backgrounds working together to monitor, review and find a strategic direction for the bidding process.

The Hungarian Olympic Committee re-elected Krisztián Kulcsár in June 2020, as well as other appointments including that of Schmitt to the executive body as representative of the IOC.

In connection with the COVID-19 pandemic, in January 2021 the Government of Hungary announced that they would provide vaccinations for Olympic Athletes who had a chance of qualifying for the next Summer and Winter Olympic games. Schmitt stated in an interview that athletes and coaches should be vaccinated as soon as possible, which would amount to approximately six to seven hundred people. Taking such actions would ensure that Hungarian athletes could participate in the qualification tournaments in preparation for the Tokyo Olympic Games.

== International Olympic Committee (IOC) ==
Schmitt became an official of the IOC in 1983 when he became Vice-Chairman of the IOC Athletes' Commission until 1988. He was also member of the Study for the Preparation of the Olympic Games Commission from 1985 to 1991, the Coordination for the 1992 Winter Olympics Commission from 1989 to 1992, the Coordination for the 1994 Winter Olympics Commission from 1989 to 1994. He was member of the Eligibility Commission from 1989 to 1992, the Olympic Movement Commission from 1993 to 1999, the Olympic Collectors Commission from 1994 to 1995, the Council of the Olympic Order Commission from 1995 to 1999, as well as a member of the "IOC 2000" (Executive Committee) in 1999. Schmitt was also a member of the International Relations Commission from 2005 to 2013, a Delegate Member for Protocol from 1999 to 2010, and part of the Public Affairs and Social Development through Sport Commission starting in 2015. From 1991 to 1999 he was Member of the Executive Board, then from 1995 to 2013 he was Chairman of the Sport and Environment Commission, as well as being Vice-President of the IOC from 1995 to 1999.

After his resignation as President of Hungary in 2012, Schmitt was removed of his position as Chief of Protocol by the IOC but remained a member.

In 2017, he was present at various events for the IOC, including meeting with the IOC President, Thomas Bach, while he was attending the FINA World Championships in Budapest. During the event, Schmitt stated in an interview that he was once again going to run for an IOC Executive Board membership. At that time, he was 75 years of age at the time, and also the fourth longest serving IOC member at the time. In September 2017, the IOC elected 8 new members, as well as a new Vice-President and three members of the Executive board. As well as re-electing 16 members that were at the end of their 8-year bloc, including Pál Schmitt who had run for one of the two vacancies in the IOC Executive Board.

In May 2018, Schmitt met once again with IOC President Bach for meetings while he was visiting the IOC headquarters in Lausanne for the farewell visit from IOC Member Alexander Zhukov. He also accompanied President Bach to the World Wrestling Championships held in Budapest in October 2018.

In 2023, he became an honorary member (instead of a regular member) of the IOC.

== Notes ==
Sporting positions
Preceded by Gábor Deák	President of the Hungarian Olympic Committee; 1989–2010	Succeeded by Zsolt Borkai
Preceded by Peter Montgomery	President of the World Olympians Association; 1999–2007	Succeeded by Dick Fosbury
Political offices
Preceded by Béla Katona	Speaker of the National Assembly; 2010	Succeeded by László Kövér
Preceded by László Sólyom	President of Hungary; 2010–2012	Succeeded by János Áder
