= 2010 Hungarian presidential election =

- 29 June 2010

Needed to win: Two-thirds of all members of the National Assembly (first ballot) 386 MPs, 257 votes needed to win
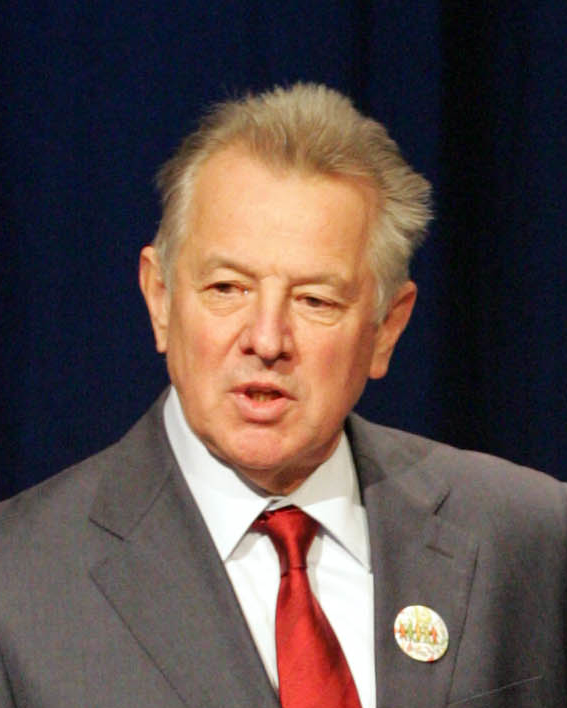

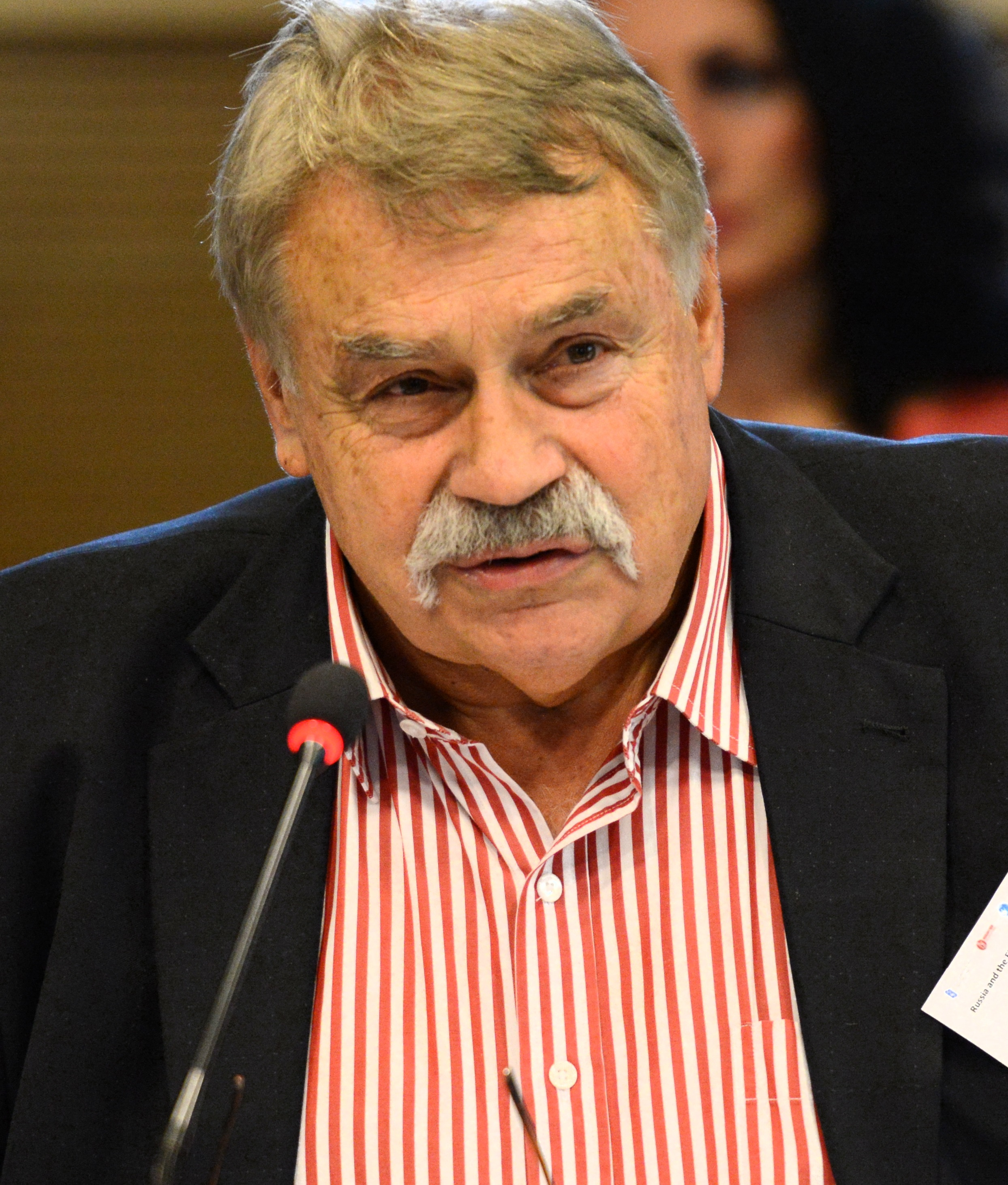
Nominee	Pál Schmitt	András Balogh
Party	Fidesz	MSZP
Alliance	Fidesz–KDNP
Electoral vote	263	59
Percentage	81.68%	18.32%
President before election
László Sólyom
Independent
Elected President
Pál Schmitt
Fidesz

An indirect presidential election was held in Hungary on 29 June 2010. Incumbent President László Sólyom was eligible for a second term, but none of those parties who had enough MPs to respectively do so nominated him again. Incumbent Speaker of the National Assembly Pál Schmitt was elected with two-third majority.

== Background ==
Following the 2010 Hungarian parliamentary election, Fidesz came out with an overwhelming majority of seats. With a two-thirds majority requirement needed to elect the president, Fidesz was expected to win since it already had the necessary numbers.

== Candidates ==
Nominations were due by midday of 25 June 2010; the Hungarian Socialist Party nominated university lecturer and Hungarian ambassador to Thailand András Balogh on 6 June 2010. Fidesz and Christian Democratic People's Party nominated National Assembly Speaker Pál Schmitt on 23 June 2010. Jobbik intended to nominate Krisztina Morvai, and Politics Can Be Different wished to nominate incumbent President László Sólyom, but neither had enough MPs to respectively do so.

== Popular poll ==
Most Hungarians said they didn't think the President should be a member of any party. 48% of respondents said that the president's independence from the government is among the most important considerations for the office, though 46% said it is also important that the president be able to work well with the prime minister.

However, polling suggested that should the election be a popular one, Schmitt would get 32% of the vote, Sólyom would get 24%, Balogh would get 14% and Morvai would get 6%. The remaining 24% said they would not vote for any of the candidates or declined to answer the question.

== Results ==
Candidate	Party	Votes	%
Pál Schmitt	Fidesz	263	81.68
András Balogh	Hungarian Socialist Party	59	18.32
Total		322	100.00
Valid votes		322	87.98
Invalid/blank votes		44	12.02
Total votes		366	100.00
Registered voters/turnout		386	94.82
Source: Politics.hu

== Reactions ==
Several Fidesz MP's expressed concern over the electoral outcome, saying that though Schmitt was "a charmer and very capable person," they didn't feel he was right for the job because any mistake he may make would reflect poorly on Prime Minister Viktor Orbán, who had selected him.

The President of the European Parliament Jerzy Buzek welcomed the election of Schmitt.
