= László Salamon =

Hungarian jurist (born 1947)

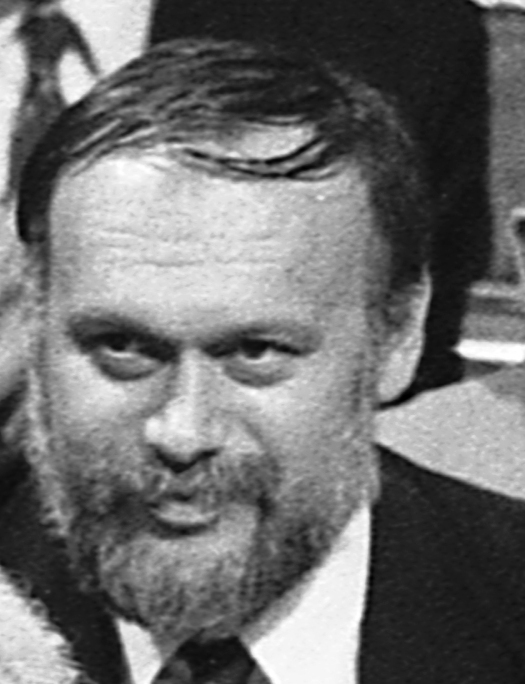
- Salamon in 1990

Member of the Constitutional Court
- In office 25 February 2013 – 25 February 2025
- President: Péter Paczolay; Barnabás Lenkovics; Tamás Sulyok; Himself (acting); Imre Juhász; Péter Polt

Acting President of the Constitutional Court
- In office 4 March 2024 – 11 June 2024
- Preceded by: Tamás Sulyok
- Succeeded by: Imre Juhász

Deputy Speaker of the National Assembly
- In office 28 June 1994 – 10 March 1996

Member of the National Assembly
- In office 2 May 1990 – 24 February 2013

Personal details
- Born: December 25, 1947 (age 78) Budapest, Hungary
- Party: MDF (1989–1996); Fidesz (since 1997)
- Other political affiliations: KDNP
- Spouse: Zsuzsanna Somogyi
- Children: 1
- Profession: jurist, politician

László Salamon (born 25 December 1947) is a Hungarian jurist, academic and politician, member of the Constitutional Court of Hungary since 2013. Prior to that, he was Member of Parliament (MP) between 1990 and 2013.

== Political career ==
Salamon was born in Budapest and finished his secondary studies at the Szent László Gimnázium in 1966. He earned his doctorate in law from the Eötvös Loránd University in 1972. He worked as a lawyer since 1974. He taught constitutional law at the Pázmány Péter Catholic University since 1995.

He joined the Hungarian Democratic Forum (MDF) in March 1989 and soon became a member of the presidium of the party's Békásmegyer branch. He participated in the Hungarian Round Table Talks as a legal expert of the MDF. During the 1990 parliamentary election, he was elected MP from his party's national list. He served as chairman of the Committee on Constitutional Affairs, Codification and Justice from 3 May 1990 to 27 June 1994. He was a member of the MDF National Board between 1993 and 1994. He was re-elected MP from his party's national list in the 1994 parliamentary election. He functioned as Deputy Speaker of the National Assembly between 28 June 1994 and 10 March 1996. He also worked in the Committee of Constitutional Preparatory from 1995 to 1996 and from 1997 to 1998.

Following the splitting of the Democratic Forum in March 1996, when Sándor Lezsák was elected party president, Salamon, among others, left the party and became Independent MP. However he did not join the newly established Hungarian Democratic People's Party (MDNP). After a few months, however, he became a member of the Fidesz parliamentary group on 10 December 1996. He joined the party itself too in 1997. During the 1998 parliamentary election, he was elected MP for Dunakeszi (Pest County Constituency III). He was a member of the Constitutional and Justice Committee between 1998 and 2002. Beside that he also served as chairman of the Standing Orders Committee from 1998 to 2002.

Salamon was re-elected MP from his party's Pest County Regional List in the 2002 parliamentary election. He remained a member of the Constitutional and Justice Committee and served as vice-chairman of the Standing Orders Committee, both until May 2006. He was re-elected MP in 2006 and 2010. After the 2006 parliamentary election, he joined the Christian Democratic People's Party parliamentary group, coalition partner of the Fidesz. From 2010 to 2011, he served as Pre-Constitutional Select Committee, therefore he participated in the drawing up of the new constitution in 2011. After that he was chairman of the Constitutional, Justice and Standing Orders Committee from 2011 to 2013. He was elected a member of the Constitutional Court in December 2012, as a result he resigned from his parliamentary seat. He was replaced by MP Gergely Gaal.

Salamon was elected vice president of the Constitutional Court on 1 March 2024. In this capacity, he presided the court temporarily following the resignation of President Tamás Sulyok on 4 March, who was elected President of Hungary. Salamon held the acting presidency until 11 June 2024, when Imre Juhász was elected chief justice.

== Selected publications ==
- Az alkotmányozási eljárás és az új alkotmány néhány kérdése (In: Takács, Imre (ed.): Az alkotmányozás jogi kérdései, 1995)
- The Questions of the Teaching of Human Rights (Rome, 1996)
- A parlament szervezetének alapkérdése; az egy- és kétkamarás parlament (Magyar Közigazgatás, 2001)
- A kizárólagos törvényhozási tárgyak de lege lata és de lege ferenda (In: Formatori, 2006)

== Sources ==
- "Salamon László". In MTI Ki kicsoda 2009 (ed. Hermann, Péter). Budapest, Magyar Távirati Iroda, 2008. p. 946.
