= Mathe =

Mathe or Mathé or Máthé may refer to:

- Mathematics

== Given name ==
- Mathé Altéry (born 1927), French soprano singer

== Surname ==
- Annanias Mathe (c. 1976–2016), Mozambique criminal
- Antoine Félix Mathé (1808–1882), French politician
- Édouard Mathé (1886–1934), French silent film actor
- Félix Mathé (1834–1911), French politician
- Gábor Máthé (footballer) (born 1985), Hungarian football player
- Gábor Máthé (lawyer) (born 1941), Hungarian lawyer
- Gábor Máthé (tennis) (born 1985), Hungarian male tennis player
- Georges Mathé (1922–2010), French oncologist and immunologist
- Henri Mathé (1837–1907), French politician
- Ketty Mathé (born 1988), French judoka
- Lew Mathe (1915–1986), American bridge player
- Pierre Mathé (1882–1956), French farmer and politician
- Vasily Mathe (1856–1917), Russian artist and engraver
- Zsuzsa Mathe (born 1964), Hungarian artist

== Films ==
- Mathe Haditu Kogile, Kannada language film
- Mathe Mungaru, Kannada language film
