= Miklós Ligeti (jurist) =

Hungarian jurist (born 1977)

Miklós Zoltán Ligeti
- Ligeti in 2025

Judge of the Constitutional Court of Hungary
- Incumbent
- Assumed office 16 September 2026
- Nominated by: Tisza Party

Personal details
- Born: 1977 (age 48–49)

Miklós Zoltán Ligeti (Note: Hungarian pronunciation: [ˈmikloːʃ ˈzoltaːn ˈligɛti]) (born 1977) is a Hungarian jurist who has served on the Constitutional Court since September 2026. He has served as Legal Director of Transparency International Hungary since 2012.

== Biography ==
Miklós Zoltán Ligeti was born in 1977. He graduated from ELTE's Faculty of Law in 2002, passing the bar exam in 2006. He worked at the National Criminology Institute, the Ministry of Justice and Law Enforcement, and the Ministry of Interior. Since 2012, he has been the legal director of Transparency International Hungary. His work has focused on combating corruption, freedom of information, and transparency in the use of public funds. Political scientist Gábor Horn said Ligeti "is one of the leading figures in exposing corruption; he has effectively become a one-man institution. He has carried out this work as a civilian, which is commendable, and both Transparency International and Ligeti play a significant role in ensuring that we become aware of these cases."

In August 2026, Ligeti applied for the position of president of the newly-formed National Asset Recovery and Protection Office. Political scientist Anna Unger was elected instead.

In September 2026, Ligeti was elected onto the Constitution Court. He took office on 16 September.
