= ELTE Faculty of Law =

University faculty

Faculty of Law
- ELTE Állam- és Jogtudományi Kar
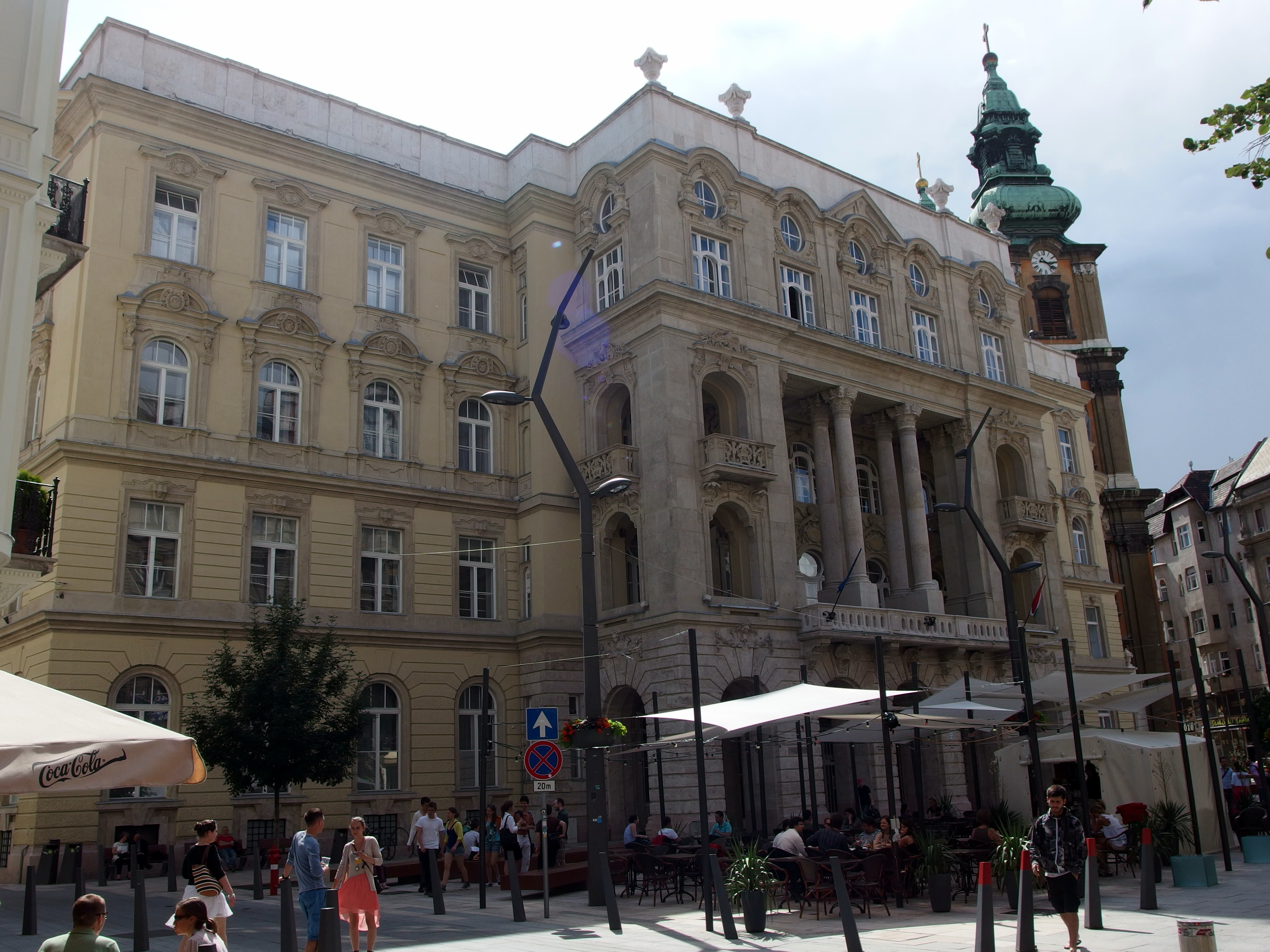
- The main building of the Faculty in Egyetem tér
- Established: 1667
- Dean: Pál Sonnevend
- Students: 2000
- Location: 1-3 Egyetem tér, Budapest, Hungary
- Campus: Urban
- Sporting affiliations: Budapesti EAC
- Website: ajk.elte.hu

The Faculty of Law of Eötvös Loránd University was founded in 1667 and it is located in Egyetem tér in Belváros-Lipótváros, Budapest, Hungary.

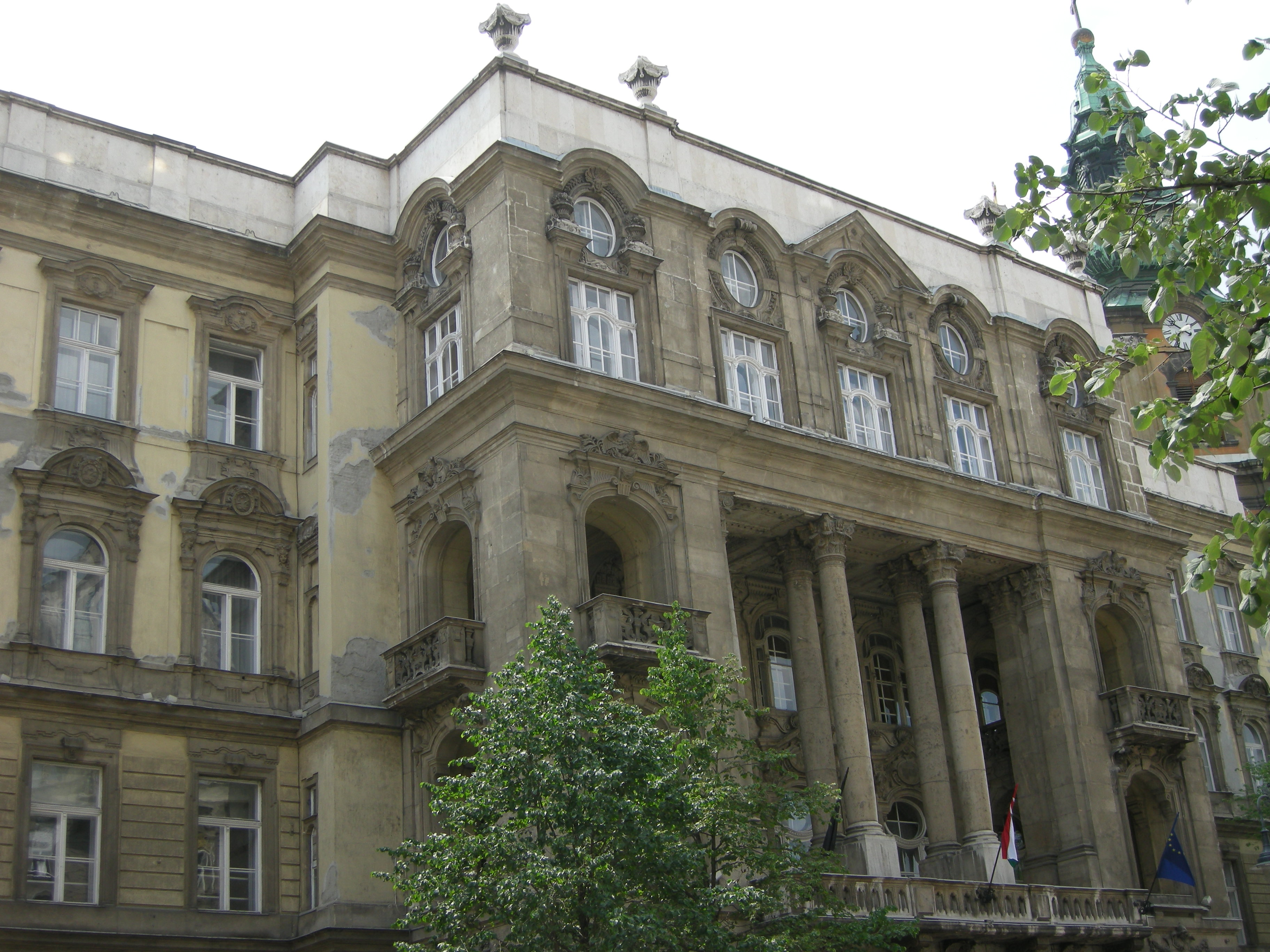
The Faculty of Law at Egyetem tér in Belváros-Lipótváros

== History ==
The Faculty of Law was founded in 1667, 32 years after the foundation of Eötvös Loránd University. Between 1667 and 1872, legal education was only available at the Faculty of Law in Hungary. Since the foundation of the Babeș-Bolyai University (at that time called Franz Joseph University) in 1872, there had been more universities offering courses on law.

Since the nineteenth century, there had been a high quality of legal education attributed to the following educators: Gusztáv Wenzel, Jenő Balogh, Győző Concha, László Fayer, Béni Grosschmid, Sándor Plósz, Gusztáv Szászy-Schwarz, and Tamás Vécsey. For a long time, the professors of the Faculty were at the same time members of the Hungarian Academy of Sciences.

In 1900 the current building of the Faculty was inaugurated. The building was designed by Sándor Baumgarten and Zsigmond Herczegh.

Between World War I and World War II, there had been high quality of education related to the following professors: Ferenc Eckhart, László Gajzágó, Zoltán Magyary, Géza Marton, Gyula Moór, Ákos Navratil, Endre Nizsalovszky, and Károly Szladits.

In 1948, several changes were implemented following the principles of Socialism that caused damages to the entire previous structure of the faculty, while also modernizing it in various ways. These changes included the introduction of the obligatory seminars, the structure of the Faculty, the foundation of student associations etc.

In 1987, Viktor Orbán graduated from the Faculty. During his studies at the Faculty, he also founded the journal Szászadvég.

Miklós Király, Dean of the Faculty, wrote an open letter to Viktor Orbán in connection with the situation of the Central European University.

== Departments ==
There are 16 departments at the Faculty of Law. Apart from 16 departments, there is one institute and one lectorate.

Department
Center for Theory of Law and Society
Department of Administrative Law
Department of Agrarian Law
Department of Civil Law
Department of Civil Procedure
Department of Constitutional Law
Department of Criminal Law
Department of Criminal Procedures and Correction
Department of Criminology
Department of Economics and Statistics
Department of Fiscal and Financial Law
Department of International Law
Department of Labour Law and Social Law
Department of Private International Law and European Economic Law
Department of Roman Law and Comparative Legal History
Department of the History of Hungarian State and Law

== Organisation ==
=== Faculty leadership ===
Title	Name
Dean	Pál Sonnevend
Sub-dean	Réka Somssich
Sub-dean	Krisztina Rozsnyai
Sub-dean	István Varga

=== Deans ===
- Attila Harmathy
- Lajos Ficzere
- Miklós Király (1 July 2008 – 1 July 2016)
- Attila Menyhárd (1 July 2016 – 1 July 2019)
- Pál Sonnevend (1 July 2019 –)

== Programs ==
The university currently offers three Master programs in English: Master in European and international business law, Master in European human rights, and Master in international and European taxation. There are two doctoral schools at the Faculty of Law and Political Sciencies: the Doctoral School of Law and the Doctoral School of Political Science.

== Notable researchers ==
Department	Researcher
Department of Civil Law	Ferenc Mádl, János Németh, László Sólyom
Department of Criminal Law	Kálmán Györgyi, Péter Polt
Department of Politics	Tamás Fellegi

== Notable alumni ==
In parentheses, the year the degree was obtained.

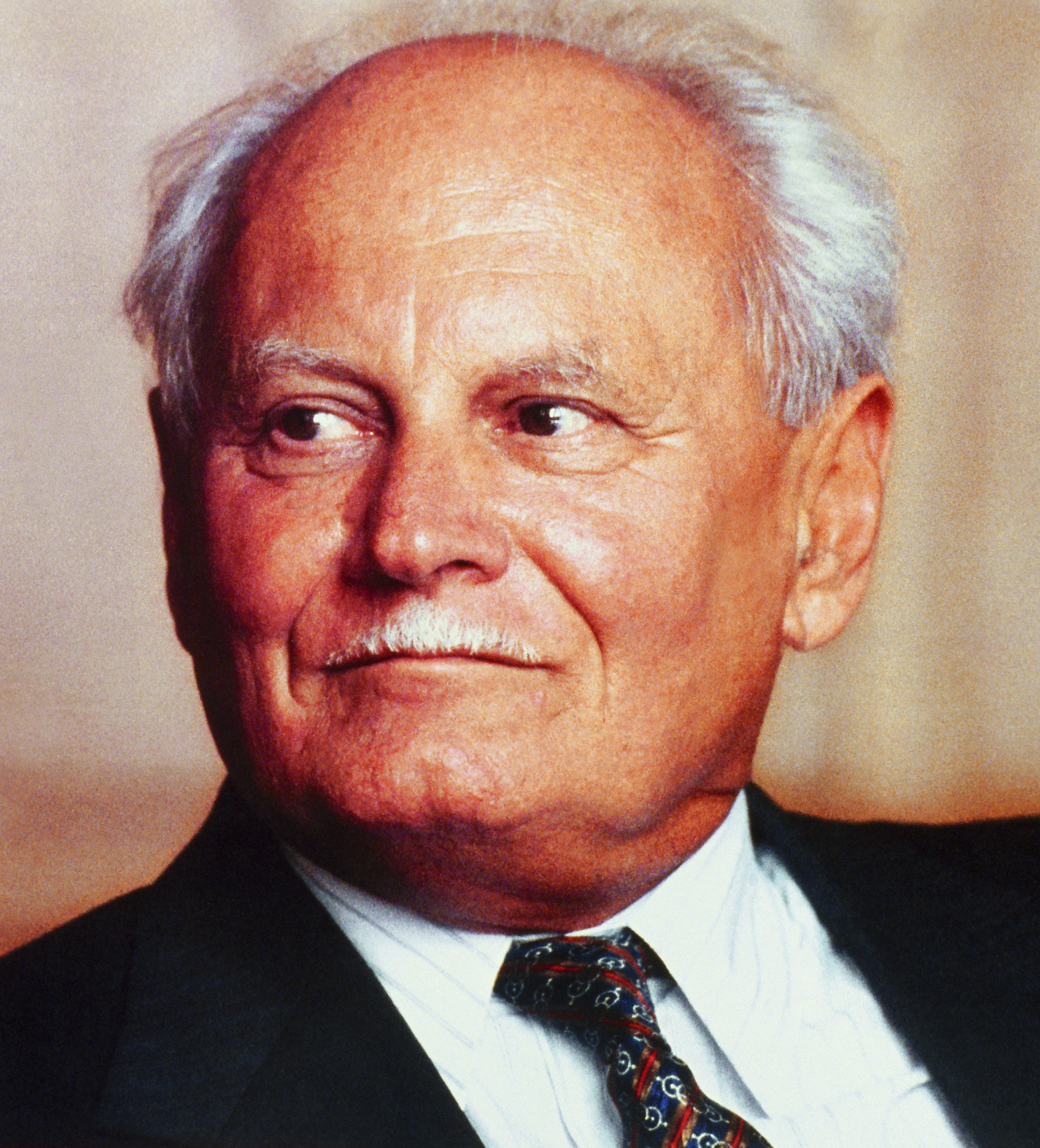
Árpád Göncz was the President of Hungary between 1990 and 2000

- János Áder, politician (former President of Hungary)
- András Baka, jurist and politician (proposed President of Hungary)
- Peter Bakonyi, Hungarian-born Canadian Olympic foil and épée fencer
- István Balsai, politician (former Minister of Justice)
- Péter Bárándy, politician (former Minister of Justice)
- Virág Blazsek, lawyer, professor (University of Leeds)
- György Bónis, lawyer
- Gyula Budai, politician
- Béla Dáner, Olympic athlete and politician
- Gábor Demszky, politician (former Mayor of Budapest)
- Tamás Deutsch, politician (former Minister of Youth Affairs and Sports)
- Klára Dobrev, politician
- Alajos Dornbach, lawyer and politician
- Dóra Dúró, politician
- Tibor Farkas, jurist
- András Fekete-Győr, politician
- Tamás Fellegi, politician (former Minister of National Development)
- Gábor Fodor, politician (former Minister of Education and Minister of Environment and Water)
- Árpád Göncz, politician (former President of Hungary)
- Csaba Gyüre, politician
- János Halmos, lawyer
- Balázs Horváth, politician (former Minister of Interior)
- Csaba Hende, politician (former Minister of Defence)
- Francisc Hossu-Longin, Romanian lawyer
- Gergely Karácsony, political analyst and politician (current Mayor of Budapest)
- Lajos Kossuth, attorney and politician (former Prime Minister of Hungary)
- Imre Kónya, politician (former Minister of Interior)
- László Kövér, politician (former Speaker of the National Assembly)
- László Krasznahorkai, novelist
- Kálmán Kulcsár, jurist and politician (former Minister of Justice)
- László György Lukács, lawyer and politician
- György Magyar, lawyer, professor and politician
- Simeon Mangiuca, Romanian folklorist
- László Majtényi, jurist and university professor
- Rodion Markovits, journalist, writer, and lawyer
- Gábor Máthé, lawyer
- Ferenc Mádl, politician (former President of Hungary)
- Krisztina Morvai, politician
- Tibor Navracsics, politician (former Minister of Regional Development)
- János Németh, jurist
- Lajos Oláh, politician
- Balázs Orbán, politician (PhD, 2024)
- Viktor Orbán, politician (former Prime Minister of Hungary)
- Csaba Őry, politician
- Sándor Pintér, politician (former Minister of Interior)
- Péter Róna, economist and lawyer
- Endre Ságvári, lawyer and activist
- András Schiffer, lawyer and politician
- István Simicskó, politician
- László Sólyom, politician (former President of Hungary)
- István Stumpf, politician (former Minister of the Prime Minister's Office) (1982)
- János Szabó, politician (former Minister of Defence)
- József Szájer, politician
- Péter Szalay, jurist (former member of the Constitutional Court of Hungary)
- Kristóf Szatmáry, politician
- Dezső Szilágyi, politician
- József Torgyán, politician
- László Trócsányi, lawyer
- Béla Turi-Kovács, politician
- Ferenc A. Váli, lawyer
- Miklós Vámos, writer
- Pál Völner, jurist and politician
- Sándor Wekerle, politician (former Prime Minister of Hungary)

== Honorary doctorates ==
- Sauli Niinistö, President of Finland

== Library ==
The Library of the Faculty of Law is located in Egyetem tér.

== Gallery ==
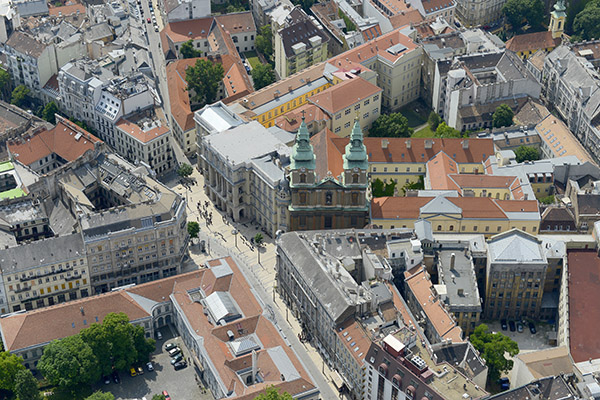
Bird view

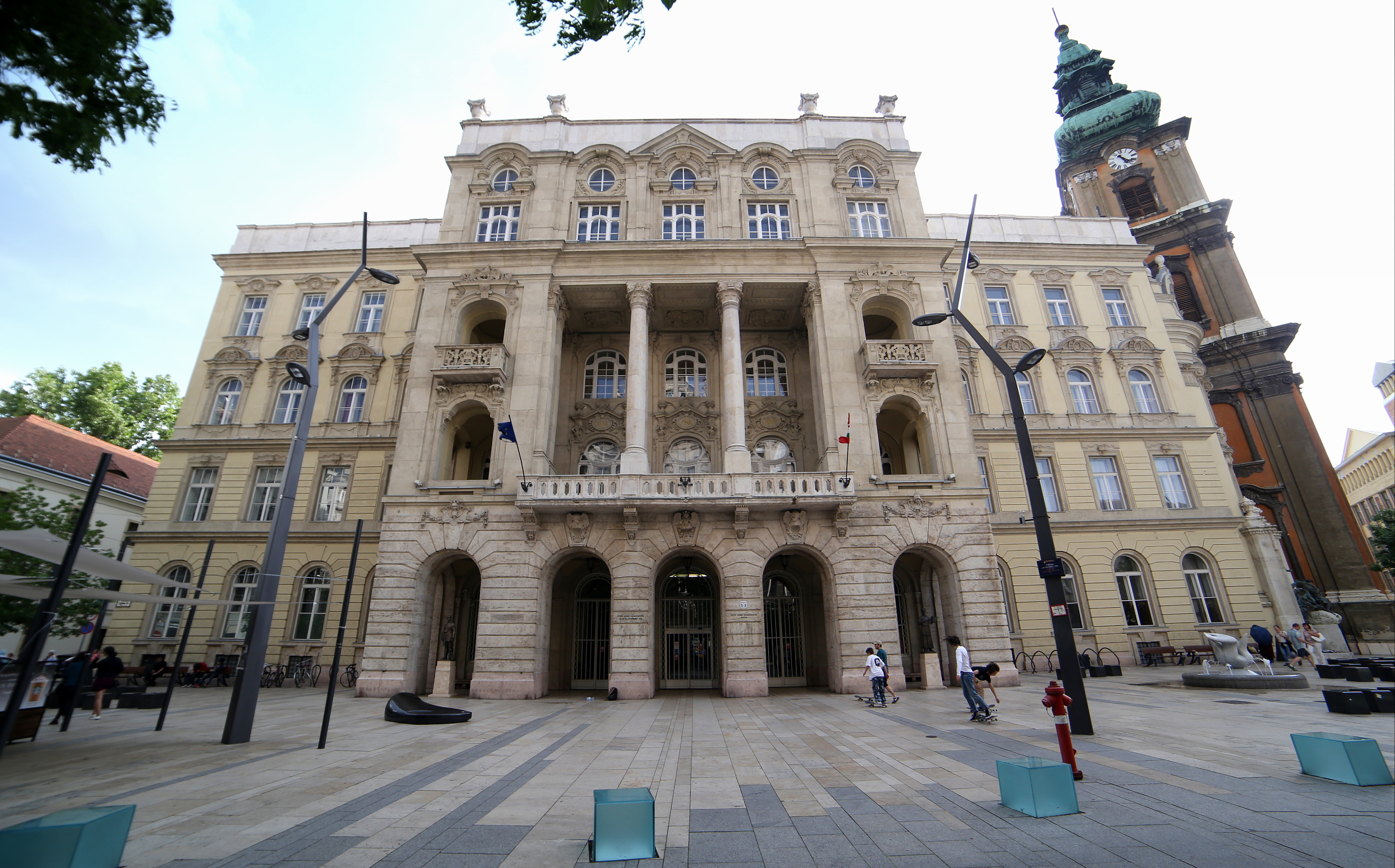
The façade

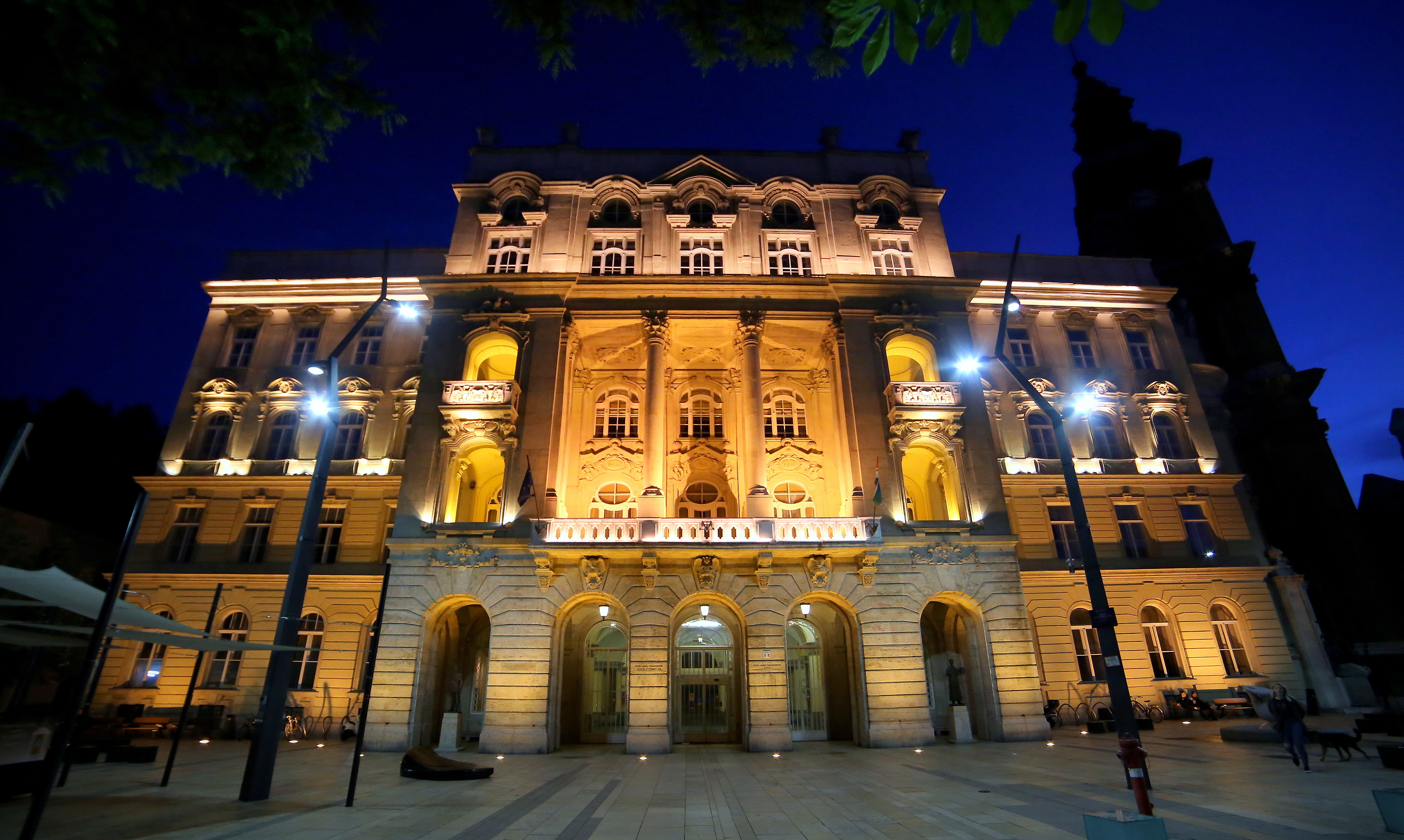
At night
