= Gábor Máthé =

Gábor Máthé may refer to:

- Gábor Máthé (footballer) (born 1985), Hungarian goalkeeper
- Gábor Máthé (tennis) (born 1985), Hungarian tennis player
- Gábor Máthé (lawyer) (born 1941), Hungarian legal historian, professor, president of the Hungarian Law Association

== See also ==
- Gábor Máté (disambiguation)
