= Péter Szalay =

Péter Szalay may refer to:

- Péter Szalay (politician)
- Péter Szalay (jurist)
- Péter Szalay (chemist)
