= Gergely Gaal =

Hungarian educator and politician

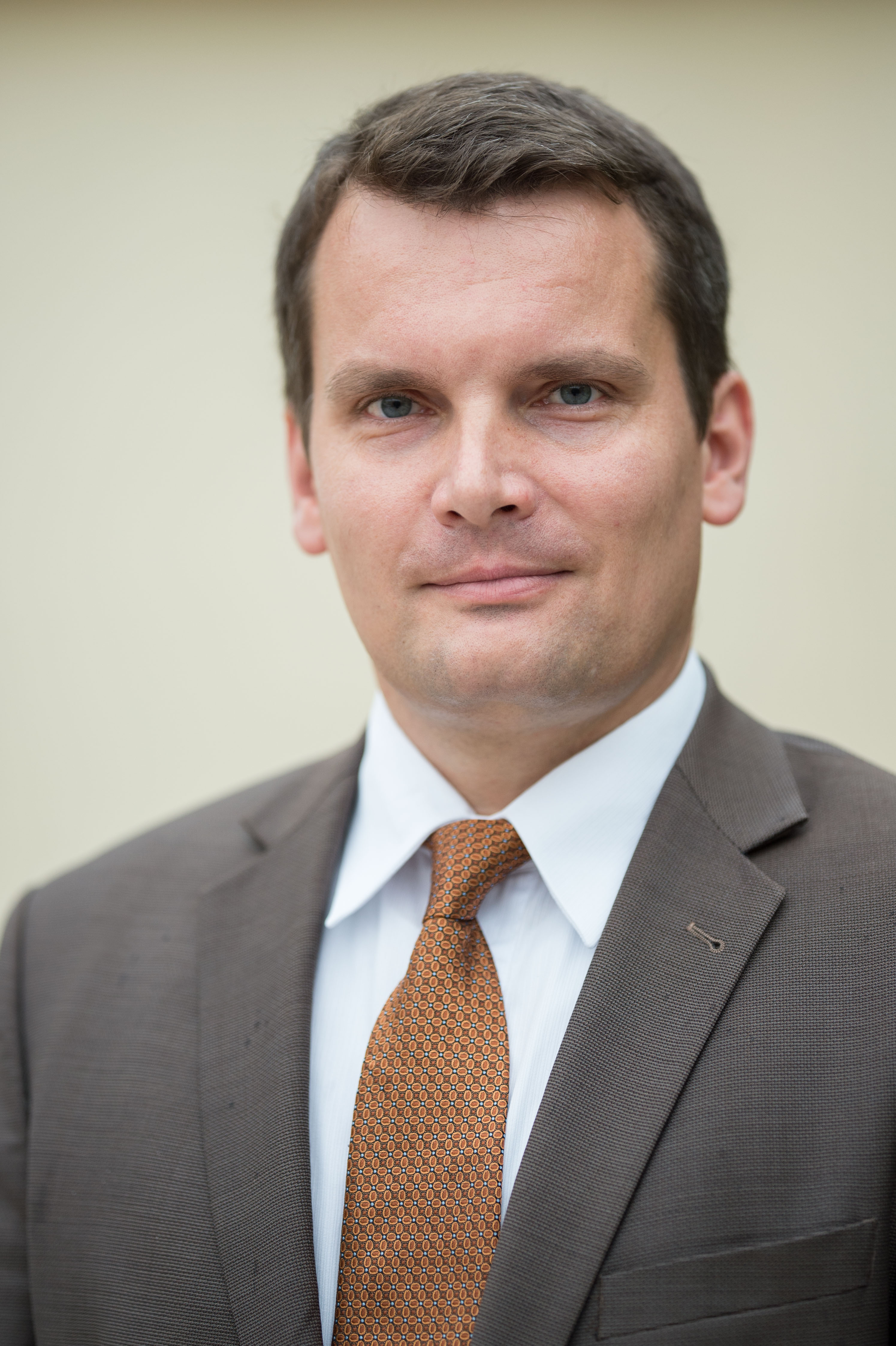

President of the Dare Hungary Party
- Incumbent
- Assumed office 7 July 2025

Member of the National Assembly
- In office 18 September 2017 – 7 May 2018
- In office 4 March 2013 – 5 May 2014

Personal details
- Born: 3 June 1977 (age 48) Budapest, Hungary
- Party: Fidesz (2004–2025); KDNP (2006–2025); MERJ (since 2025)
- Spouse: Bernadett Gaal-Hasulyó
- Profession: educator, politician

Gergely Gaal (born 3 June 1977) is a Hungarian educator and politician, member of the National Assembly (MP) from Fidesz–KDNP Pest County Regional List from 2013 to 2014 and from National List between 2017 and 2018.

Gaal joined Fidesz in 2004 and KDNP in 2006. He was elected deputy mayor of Solymár in the 2010 local elections. He became MP from the party's Pest County Regional List in March 2013, replacing László Salamon, who was appointed a member of the Constitutional Court of Hungary, as a result he resigned on 24 February 2013. Gaal was elected a member of the Committee of National Cohesion on 4 March 2013 and Committee on Youth, Social, Family and Housing Affairs on 10 June 2013.

He was elected MP again on 18 September 2017, replacing György Rubovszky, who died in office in June 2017. Gaal was appointed Ministerial Commissioner within the Prime Minister's Office responsible for the coordination and promotion of settlement development programs at the local level and from domestic sources on 10 December 2020.

On 22 May 2025, he announced in a video that he would resign from the KDNP national presidency, but would retain his party membership. He justified his resignation by saying, "It would not be credible on my part to continue to stand by a leadership whose worst face I have seen and whose discredit and distortion I have experienced firsthand."
