= National Asset Recovery and Protection Office =

Hungarian government agency

- Nemzeti Vagyonvisszaszerzési és Vagyonvédelmi Hivatal

Office overview
- Formed: 29 July 2026 (de jure) (Note: The law establishing the NVVH came into force on 29 July 2026.; The President and Deputy President for Investigations began their terms on 1 September.; The law granting the NVVH its criminal procedure powers came into force on 27 September.; The NVVH announced its first cases on 28 September.; The remaining deputy president positions were filled on 13 October.)
- Jurisdiction: Government of Hungary
- Office executives: Anna Unger, President; Katalin Tasnádi, Deputy President for Investigations; Károly Ötvös, Deputy President for Public Finance; Károly Árpád Gellért, Deputy President for Prosecution; Tibor Dávid Terhes, Deputy President for Appeals

The National Asset Recovery and Protection Office (Hungarian: Nemzeti Vagyonvisszaszerzési és Vagyonvédelmi Hivatal, NVVH) is an autonomous prosecuting government agency in Hungary tasked with investigating cases of public assets misuse, as well as recovering unlawfully acquired assets. To this end, the institution has broad powers to act. The NVVH was established by the Péter Magyar–led Tisza Party following its landslide election victory in 2026, in accordance with its key campaign promises.

Since 2010, when Prime Minister Viktor Orbán took power, a small circle of his associates amassed extensive wealth. Characterized by highly centralized and thriving grand corruption, the Orbán regime turned Hungary into the most corrupt country in the EU and a kleptocracy.

== Background ==
=== Hungary under Viktor Orbán ===
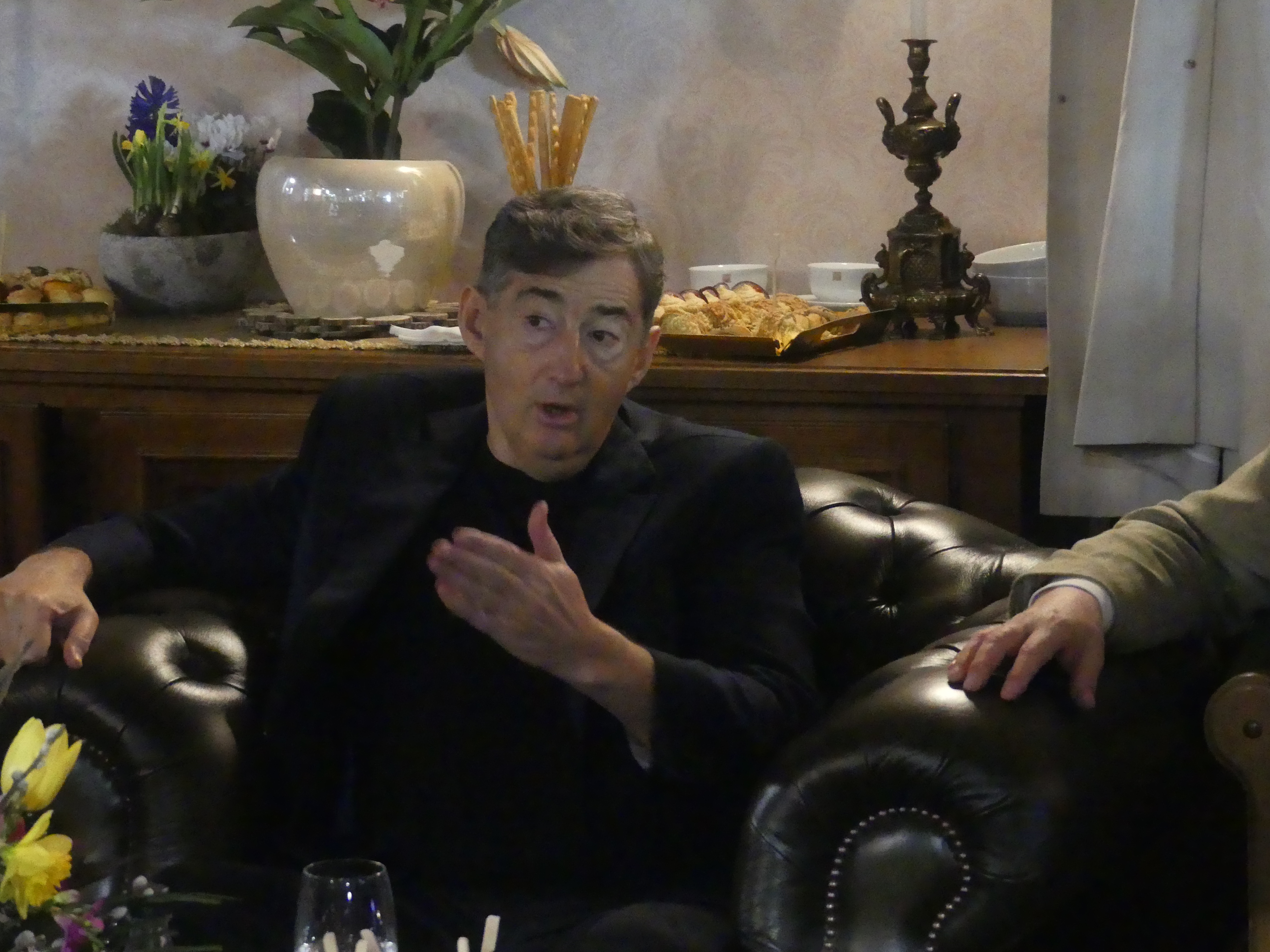
Lőrinc Mészáros (pictured in 2024), former pipefitter and Orbán's childhood friend, became the richest Hungarian under Orbán's rule. He attributed his success to "God, luck, and Viktor Orbán".

Through their expanding control over Hungary's economy and EU-funded contracts, a small circle of Viktor Orbán's associates amassed extensive wealth. The Orbán regime was characterized by highly centralized and thriving grand corruption. Orbán's family, Fidesz members, and Orbán-affiliated oligarchs, journalists, academics, and artists have received extensive public funds. Under Orbán, Hungary became the most corrupt country in the EU and a kleptocracy. Many of Hungary's largest corporations grew from nothing through state assets under Orbán's sixteen consecutive years in power.

Several systems were created so that decision-makers with public authority can divert public funds to themselves. The conditions of suitability of public procurements were often defined so that only a specific company could meet them. Examples include the companies of the son-in-law of Orbán, István Tiborcz, and of Orbán's childhood friend Lőrinc Mészáros, who went from being a pipefitter to becoming the richest Hungarian. Around 30% of public procurements had no formal competition, as they only had one bidder. 38 of Forbes's richest 50 Hungarians acquired their wealth under Orbán or were boosted through public procurements during his tenure.

Insufficient control resulted in the overpricing of EU projects becoming a general phenomenon: over 90% were overpriced, on average by a rate of 25%. In 2022, the European Commission launched rule-of-law procedures in response to allegations of widespread clientelism in the distribution of EU funds. This resulted in the withholding of significant amounts of EU funds Hungary was otherwise entitled to.

Before the NVVH, the public prosecutor's office possessed a monopoly over bringing indictments. Orbán's government appointed Péter Polt, a member of Fidesz, as Chief Prosecutor. Polt rarely brought corruption charges against Fidesz politicians.

=== Rise of the Tisza Party ===
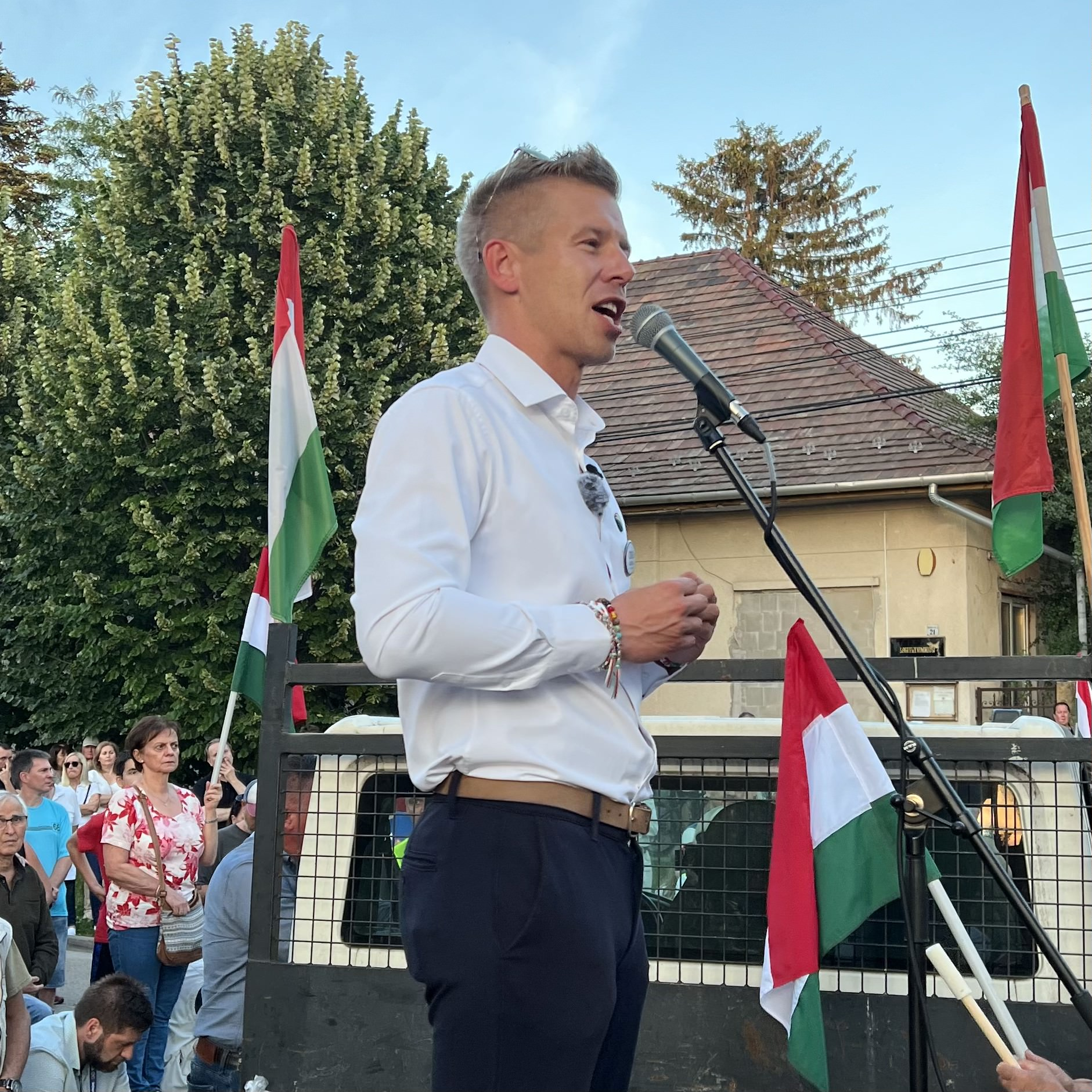
During his nationwide political tours, Magyar (pictured in 2024) pledged to establish the NVVH in order to recover unlawfully acquired state assets.

One of the Tisza Party's key campaign promises was the establishment of the NVVH, as well as to hold accountable politically connected business figures from the Orbán era. Characterizing it a mafia state, Péter Magyar claimed that corruption under Orbán cost Hungarians 8–10% of GDP or around €60 billion. In accordance with Tisza's campaign pledge, Hungary joined the European Public Prosecutor's Office, responsible for investigating, prosecuting, and bringing to judgment criminal offenses affecting the EU's financial interests.

According to The Guardian, after Tisza's landslide election victory, Orbán associates rushed to move their wealth outside the country, to places such as the Middle East, Australia, or Singapore. Private jets were allegedly taking off from Vienna transporting their wealth. Some invested their assets abroad, and some were looking into work at MAGA-related organizations. Magyar said that during the last weeks of Orbán's premiership, incriminating documents were being shredded. After 50 days in office, Minister Bálint Ruff said in an interview that "starting in 2016, the government essentially had no other goal than to enrich people."

== History ==
In June 2026, Péter Magyar introduced "Operation Cleansing Fire", which included Fundamental Law amendments to provide the constitutional basis for the NVVH's establishment. According to Magyar, following the change of government, they have been finding more and more concessions and overpriced contracts. The bill was submitted on 10 July. Passed in the National Assembly by Tisza's supermajority, the law entered into force on 29 July 2026. It is a cardinal law, requiring a two-thirds majority to amend.

On 27 August 2026, the National Assembly's Committee for Judicial and Constitutional Affairs nominated political scientist Anna Unger as president of the NVVH. The next day, Tisza's parliamentary supermajority elected her as president, and Katalin Tasnádi as deputy president for investigations. At the end of September, the office announced the first four corruption cases they will handle: the "visa business" of Viktor Orbán's brother Áron, (Note: concerning "selling political connections to obtain residence permits for employment") the park maintenance case, the Volánbusz case, (Note: involving "a state-owned company and state investments" and one of Hungary's richest, Dániel Jellinek) and the spendings of the Orbán-era Sovereignty Protection Office. (Note: due to its "seemingly unjustified propaganda and event costs") In October, the remaining deputy president positions were filled by the National Assembly: Károly Ötvös as Deputy President for Public Finance, Károly Árpád Gellért as Deputy President for Prosecution, and Tibor Dávid Terhes as Deputy President for Appeals.

== Duties and authority ==
The NVVH is responsible for investigating cases involving the unlawful management of public assets; protecting public assets; and locating, identifying, securing, preserving the value of, and recovering assets that have been removed from the public estate as a result of or in connection with a criminal offense. Unlike similar agencies in Europe, the NVVH – called a superagency by some – has authority to investigate, file charges, and recover stolen public assets on its own. The NVVH has authority to take over corruption investigations from other agencies, as well as to impose fines of up to five billion forints (€16.5 million) for obstruction.

The agency has access to official documents, records, and bank accounts to perform risk assessment.

The institution may conduct public asset protection investigations to inspect suspicious contracts, transactions, and true owners of companies. During this, the NVVH may request information or collect evidence, but it may not enter private property.

In order to safeguard a company's assets, the office may initiate public asset oversight proceedings, during which a deputy chairperson of the NVVH becomes the business entity's supervisor. For companies suspected of unlawfully possessing state assets, assuming obligations requires the supervisor's consent, preventing the company from stripping its assets.

The agency may exercise prosecutorial powers by performing investigations, as well as by initiating criminal and civil proceedings.

== Structure ==
The NVVH operates independently of the government and is only accountable to the National Assembly. The agency is run by a five-member leadership. The positions of president and deputy presidents are selected through an open recruitment process, approved by the National Assembly, and their terms of office are six years. They are under constant protection of the police. The president manages the office's staff, finances, and operations. They have authority to order investigations, file complaints, and initiate lawsuits.

The NVVH may transfer prosecutors, tax investigators, and police officers from other agencies to itself, with the consent of the Chief Prosecutor, President of the National Tax and Customs Administration, and Minister of the Interior, respectively, and of the employee. They may not earn less than in their previous position. The institution plans to employ a few hundred people.

=== List of presidents ===
List of presidents of the NVVH showing terms of office
No.	Portrait	Name	Term of office			Ref.
No.	Portrait	Name	Took office	Left office	Tenure	Ref.
1		Anna Unger	1 September 2026	Incumbent	74 days	

== Reception ==
According to a July 2026 Publicus poll shortly before the formation of the NVVH, 78% of Hungarians supported the establishment of the agency. Almost 100% of Tisza voters and 29% of Fidesz voters agreed with it.

Human rights organizations raised concerns about the rule of law, noting that the original draft of the legislation did not provide sufficient legal safeguards against the abuse of the agency's broad powers. Before adoption, the National Assembly addressed these concerns, subjecting the office's measures to judicial oversight, and establishing an internal human rights officer.

Political scientist Gábor Török considered the NVVH's establishment as the "most important political measure" of the Magyar government. According to Török, Magyar's government would lose Hungarians' trust if the "culprits of the previous order" were to get away with their crimes.

Fidesz politicians criticized the NVVH, claiming that it would only prosecute those who hold different political views than Tisza, comparing it to the communist-era secret police ÁVH. Fidesz–KDNP MPs did not participate in nominating to the presidency, nor electing Anna Unger. Fidesz MP Gábor Szűcs called the NVVH "just a facade... Today they say they're looking for corrupt officials; and tomorrow they'll say everyone needs to be investigated." Fidesz turned to the Constitutional Court, requesting it to vacate the law. Former Prime Minister Viktor Orbán said that Fidesz will track and publish the names of everyone who will work at the NVVH.

== See also ==
- Central Anticorruption Bureau (Poland)
- Malaysian Anti-Corruption Commission
- National Anti-Corruption Authority (Italy)
- National Anticorruption Directorate (Romania)
- Presidential Commission on Good Government (Philippines)
- Special Investigating Unit (South Africa)
