= Barnabás Lenkovics =

Hungarian jurist (1950–2025)

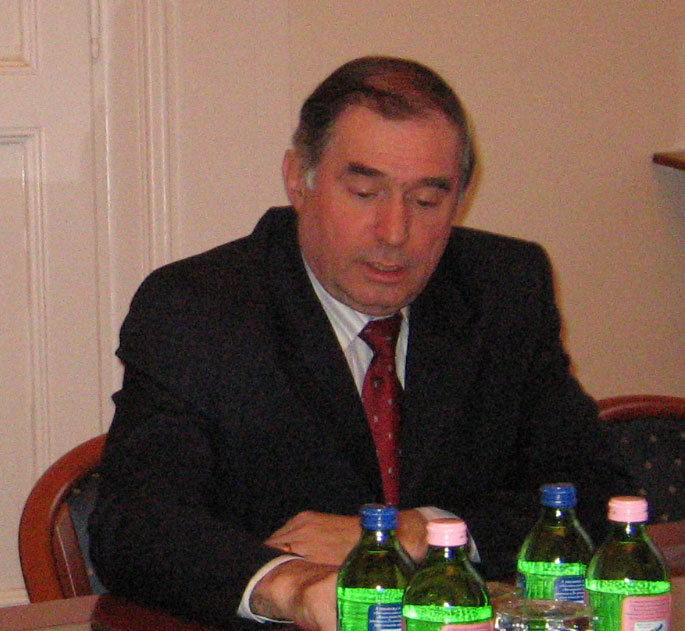
- Lenkovics in 2007

President of the Constitutional Court of Hungary
- In office 25 February 2015 – 21 April 2016
- Preceded by: Péter Paczolay
- Succeeded by: Tamás Sulyok

Personal details
- Born: 26 July 1950 Rakamaz, Hungary
- Died: 1 May 2025 (aged 74)
- Education: Eötvös Loránd University
- Occupation: Jurist

Barnabás Lenkovics (26 July 1950 – 1 May 2025) was a Hungarian jurist. He served as president of the Constitutional Court from 2015 to 2016.

Lenkovics died on 1 May 2025, at the age of 74.
