= Anna Unger (political scientist) =

Hungarian political scientist (born 1980)

Anna Róza Unger
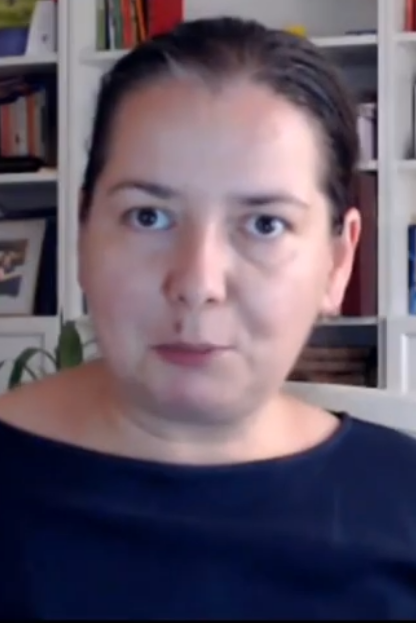
- Unger in 2024

President of the National Asset Recovery and Protection Office
- Incumbent
- Assumed office 1 September 2026
- Preceded by: Office established

Personal details
- Born: 1980 (age 45–46) Budapest
- Education: ELTE Faculty of Law

Anna Róza Unger (Note: Hungarian pronunciation: [ˈɒnːɒ ˈroːzɒ ˈuŋgɛr]) (born 1980) is a Hungarian political scientist who has served as President of the National Asset Recovery and Protection Office since September 2026.

== Biography ==
Anna Róza Unger was born in 1980 in Budapest. She received her bachelor's degree in political science in 2003 at ELTE's Faculty of Law. She received a doctorate PhD in political science in 2018. Her main area of research was the theory and practice of democracy. She focused on processes of democratic backsliding and democratization, direct democracy, and the comparison of democratic and non-democratic systems.

She has been a guest at events organized think tanks and civil society organizations. She has been an associate professor at ELTE's Faculty of Social Sciences.

In August 2026, the Tisza Party's supermajority elected Unger as President of the National Asset Recovery and Protection Office. She took office on 1 September for a term of six years. Unger's election was condemned by the Lawyer's Circle (Ügyvédkör), citing her lack of a legal degree, as well as relevant experience in criminal law and the application of the law. According to political scientist Péter Farkas Zárug, Unger was the best choice for the position.

== Notes ==
Legal offices
| New office | President of the National Asset Recovery and Protection Office; 2026–present | Incumbent |
