= Miklós Vámos =

Hungarian writer and screenwriter (born 1950)

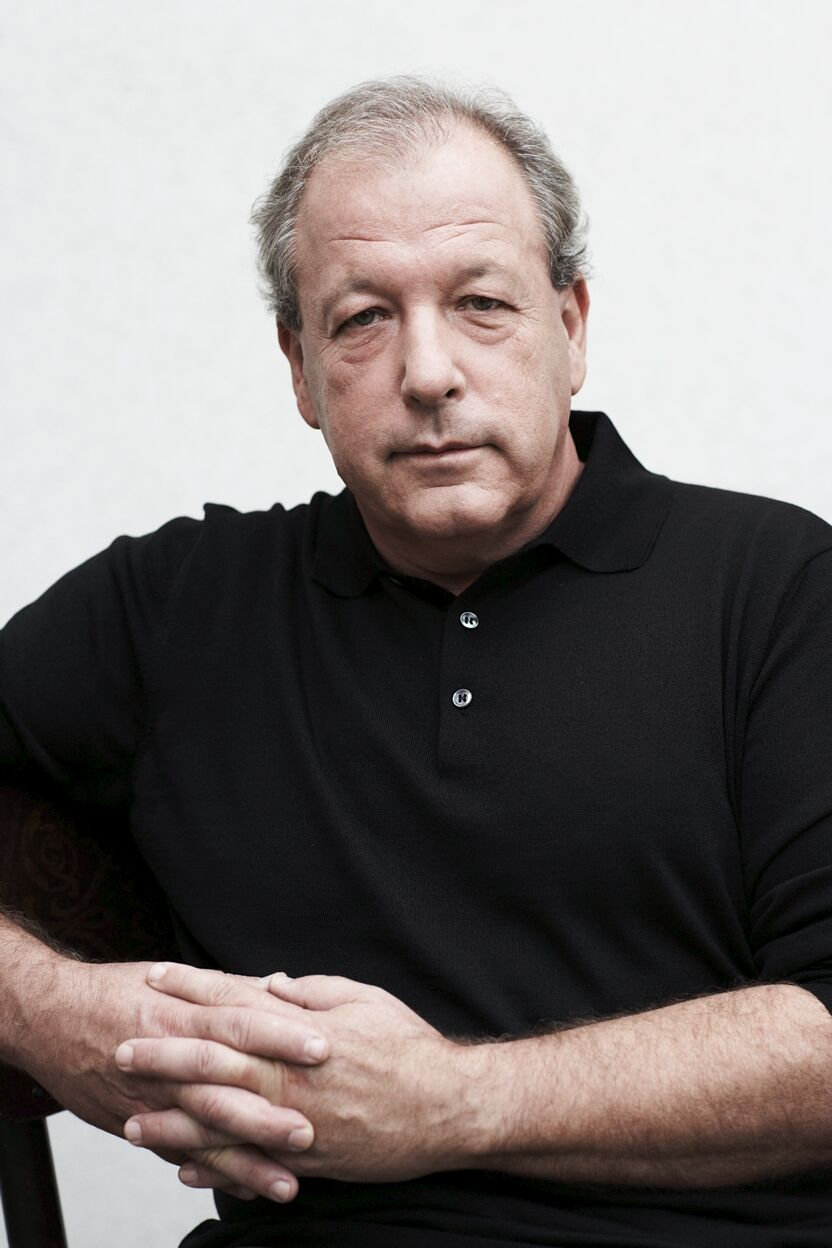
- Born: 29 January 1950 (age 76); Budapest, Hungary
- Relatives: Mother: Erzsébet Ribárszky; Father: Tibor Vámos
- Writing career
- Genres: Short stories, Novels; Literary history Essays,
- Website: Miklós Vámos

Signature
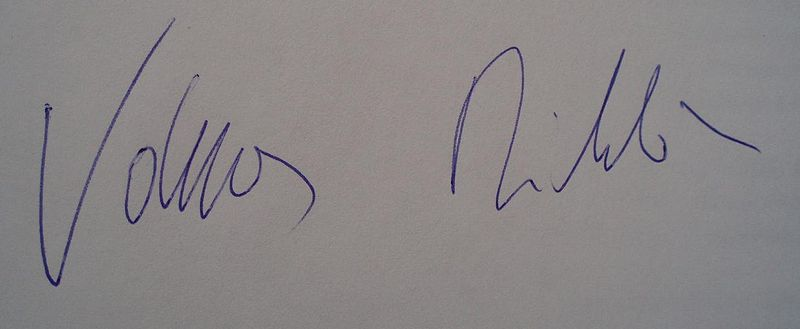

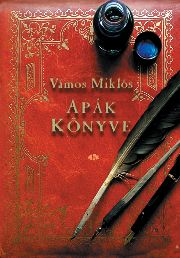
The Book of Fathers

Miklós Vámos (born 29 January 1950), originally Tibor Vámos, is a Hungarian writer, novelist, screenwriter, translator and talkshow host, who has published 33 books.

== Biography ==
Vámos was born in Budapest, the son of Tibor Vámos and Erzsébet Ribárszky. He used the name Tibor until his 19th birthday, when he changed it to Miklós.

He graduated from the Kölcsey Gimnázium French department in 1968. He was a member of the rock band Gerilla between 1966 and 1971. On his first try, he was rejected from ELTE Faculty of Humanities due to political issues. From 1969 he worked in the university press as a setter. He wrote about this in his novel Borgis. Between 1969 and 1970 he was a soldier at Kalocsa. He studied at ELTE Faculty of Law in Budapest from 1970 to 1974, PhD in law, 1975.

From 1972 he was the editor of the Jelenlét an arts faculty magazine. His first writings were published in literary journals "Új írás" in 1969.

After his graduation in 1975 he worked at the Objektív Filmstúdió as a dramaturg, until 1992. Between 1988 and 1990 he lived in the US. He worked at Yale School of Drama, City University of New York. He also was the reporter of The Nation an American weekly issued newspaper. From 1992 he is the president of the Ab Ovo organization. Between 1995 and 2003 he worked as a television talkshow host in popular series such as Rögtön, Lehetetlen and 2 ember. From 1997 until 2003 he also worked as the art director of the International Buda Stage.

Since 2005 he is the talkshow host of reports with famous writers and poets at Alexandra's bookhouse.

It is broadcast by the channels Pax and Duna II. He is also the Hungarian reporter of the Washington Post. He understands many languages, including German, English, French, Spanish, Russian and even Latin. He has a sister Éva Vámos. From his first marriage with Judit Pataki, he has a daughter, Anna Vámos. From his second marriage with Dóra Esze, he has twin boys, Péter and Henrik.

== Career ==
- 1969–Present: writer of novels.
- 1975–1988, Columnist of the Élet és Irodalom ("Life and Literature", literary weekly, Budapest).
- 1988–1990, visiting professor at Yale University, teaching playwriting and screenwriting.
- 1988–1989, Fulbright and CASTA Fellow at Yale University and at City University of New York.
- 1990–2003, East European correspondent to The Nation magazine (US).
- 1995–2003, Host of popular cultural TV talk shows, "Rögtön", "Lehetetlen", "2 ember".
- 2005– Talk show at Alexandra Pódium, "Vámos Klub".

== Works ==
- Borgisz Type, Kozmosz, Budapest, (1976), a novel. Hungarian title: Borgisz.
- Me and me, Magvető, Budapest, (1979), a novel. Hungarian title: Én és Én.
- Head over Hills, Budapest, (1983), two short novels. Hungarian title: Hanyatt-homlok.
- Sing a song, Ab Ovo, Budapest, (1983), a novel. Hungarian title: Zenga zének.
- Passionate People, "Szenvedélyes emberek, (1986).
- Protest Song, "Félnóta" a novel", (1986).
- Oy, "Jaj" a novel, (1988).
- The New York-Budapest Subway, a novel, (1993).
- If I Were a Rock Star, "Ha én Bródy volnék" a novel, (1994).
- Mothers Are Not Chosen by Election, "Anya csak egy van" a novel, (1995).
- The Book of Fathers, a novel, (2000).
- Lame Dog, "Sánta kutya", a novel, (2003).
- Márquez and I, "Márkez meg én", a novel, (2004).
- Trips in Erotica (Who the Hell is Goethe?), a novel, (2007).
- Protest Song, "Félnóta" a novel, (2009), new version.
- Pure fire, "Tiszta tűz" a novel, (2010),
- The world of the stars, "Csillagok világa" a novel, (2011),
- The Book of Fathers, new version, 2011. May,

== Other books ==
- Preface to the ABC's, Előszó az ábécéhez, short stories, (1972).
- She's Thirteenth on the List, Jelenleg tizenharmadik a listán, short stories, (1973).
- Changing, Váltás, short stories, (1977).
- Theodore Orang, PhD, Dr. Orángutay Tivadar, a tale, (1980).
- Somebody Else, Valaki más, selected short stories, (1981).
- Three Cheers, Háromszoros vivát, plays and radioplays, (1981).
- The Absent Correspondent Writes, "Ki nem küldött tudósítónk jelenti," selected articles, (1985).
- Play Tennis with Me (I Still Can't Either), Teniszezz velem (én se tudok még), an essay, (1988).
- United Steaks of America, Egybesült Államok, written in English, published at University Press, (1989).
- 135 Impossible Stories, 135 Lehetetlen történet, portraits of actors, writers and artists, (1997).
- Bar, Bár, 31 short stories, (1998).
- The Xenophobe's Guide to the Hungarians, written in English with Matyas Sarkozy. Published by Oval Books, London, (1999). Translated into 14 languages (Hungarian included!)
- Bravo, Hogy volt, memories and portraits, (2005).
- contrite confession, töredelmes vallomás (2016)

== His works published in English ==
- The Xenophobe's Guide to the Hungarians, by Miklós Vámos and Mátyás Sárközi, Oval Books, London, (1999).
- The Book Of Fathers, Publisher: Little Braun, England, (2006), Translator: Peter Sherwood. Hungarian language title: Apák könyve.

== The Book Of Fathers ==
This is a monumental family saga, the adventures of twelve generations. Over three hundred years of Hungarian history, and the story of all fathers. The story begins in 1706, when the Czuczor printer family, having recently returned to Hungary from Germany, is forced to flee again by the violence which ensues after the Habsburg army suppresses the war of Hungarian independence led by Prince Ferenc Rákóczi. They hide out in a cave but are found and all killed, except the youngest boy, Kornél Csillag. After this miraculous survival (he is fed by a dog while living in the woods), Kornél grows up to become a talented and wealthy man, changing his name to Sternovszky. His son remembers the grandfather's buried treasure and builds a tower on top of the blown up cave, whilst the next son, István, now called Stern, in order to marry his lover converts to Judaism and becomes a wine merchant. And so the lineage carries on, through the Hungary's Holocaust, its Stalinist terror of the 1950s, and eventually passing to America, where Henryk Csillag is born. He moves to Budapest, and it is his son who picks up the tale of the book of fathers in 1999, the year of the solar eclipse. Thus the lineage of sons is brought into conjunction with the heavenly ordained cycle of the son. In chronicling this remarkable dynasty. The book thrillers and tragicomedies which is shot through with strands of Hungary's history and rich culture, deploying an astonishing battery of literary styles appropriate to the period of each episode.

== Films ==
- Head over Heels, Hanyatt-homlok, (1983), writer. Directed by George Revesz.
- Electric Train, Villanyvonat, (1984), writer. Directed by George Gat. (Award for the Best Script).
- Love, Mother, Csók, Anyu, 1987. Directed by Janos Rozsa. (Award of the Best Film of the Year; Award of the Hungarian Youth Association; Best Acting at the 1990 Jerusalem Film Festival).
- Samba, Szamba, shot in (1995), directed by Robert Koltai.
- Ámbár tanár úr, writers, Róbert Koltai and Miklós Vámos. (1998).
- Aqua by Miklós Vámos novel, (2006), directed by David Spah.

== Literary awards ==
- Award of Critics, (1977).
- Award of the Hungarian Youth Association, (1983).
- József Attila-Award, (one of the most prestigious literary awards in Hungary) (1984).
- Award of the Unions for Life Achievement, (1996).
- Camera Hungaria, (2000).
- Awards of the Hungarian Libraries, (2000).
- Pro Cultura Urbis, (2002).
- Columbus Award, (2003).
- Honors of Merit of the Hungarian Republic, (2004)
