= Ferenc A. Váli =

Hungarian lawyer, writer and political analyst

Ferenc A. Váli (May 25, 1905 - November 19, 1984) was a Hungarian lawyer, writer, and political analyst specializing in international law. He was born in 1905 in Budapest, Hungary. He received his Doctorate at the Faculty of Law of the University of Budapest in 1927, and his Ph.D. in political science at the University of London in 1932. From 1935 he was a member of the Law Faculty at the University of Budapest. Váli published several books in Hungarian, German and English.

During World War II the Hungarian government sent him to Istanbul, Turkey, on a confidential mission to make contact with the Allied powers. During 1943 to 1946 he lectured at the University of Istanbul on International Law.

Returning to Hungary after the war, he was international law adviser to the Hungarian Ministry of Finance, and continued teaching at the University of Budapest until he was banned from the faculty and from the ministry by the Communists early in 1949. In 1951, Váli's western connections led to his arrest. His wife was also arrested. She remained in prison for three years. He was provisionally released on October 18, 1956. Five days later the Hungarian Revolution broke out and he was recalled to the university and participated in an effort to reorganize the Hungarian Ministry of Foreign Affairs. After the Revolution was crushed, Váli and his wife escaped from Hungary into Austria.

With a fellowship from the Rockefeller Foundation, he did research in London, Paris and The Hague, and after December 1957, in New York and Washington. From 1958 to 1961, Váli was a research associate at the Harvard Center for International Affairs. In September 1961 he joined the government department at the University of Massachusetts Amherst and stayed there until his retirement in 1975. Váli died on 19 November 1984 in Massachusetts, U.S.A.

== Books of Váli ==
- Servitudes of International Law (London)
- Rift and Revolt in Hungary (Harvard University Press, 1961)
- The Future of Germany (Germany, 1967)
- The Quest for a United Germany (The Johns Hopkins Press, 1967)
- Politics of the Indian Ocean Region: The Balances of Power (New York, 1976)
- Bridge across the Bosporus (The Johns Hopkins Press, 1971)
