= Tamás Kovács (jurist) =

Hungarian general (1940–2020)

Chief Prosecutor
- In office 9 October 2006 – 13 December 2010
- Preceded by: Péter Polt
- Succeeded by: Péter Polt

Personal details
- Born: 13 December 1940 Nagykónyi, Hungary
- Died: 26 April 2020 (aged 79) Hungary
- Children: 3
- Profession: jurist

Military service
- Allegiance: Hungary
- Branch/service: Army of Hungary
- Years of service: 1965–2006
- Rank: Lieutenant General

Lt. Gen. Tamás Kovács (13 December 1940 – 26 April 2020) was a Hungarian military officer and jurist, who served as Chief Prosecutor of Hungary from 2006 to 2010.

He served as Army Chief Prosecutor since 1990. He was nominated for the position by President László Sólyom. The National Assembly appointed him for 6-year term. However Kovács reached the age of 70 in 2010, and, under the laws, he was replaced by Péter Polt on his 70th birthday, who was elected on 7 December 2010 by the National Assembly.

Legal offices
Preceded by Péter Polt	Chief Prosecutor; 2006–2010	Succeeded by Péter Polt
