= Endre Ságvári =

Hungarian politician and resistance fighter (1913–1944)

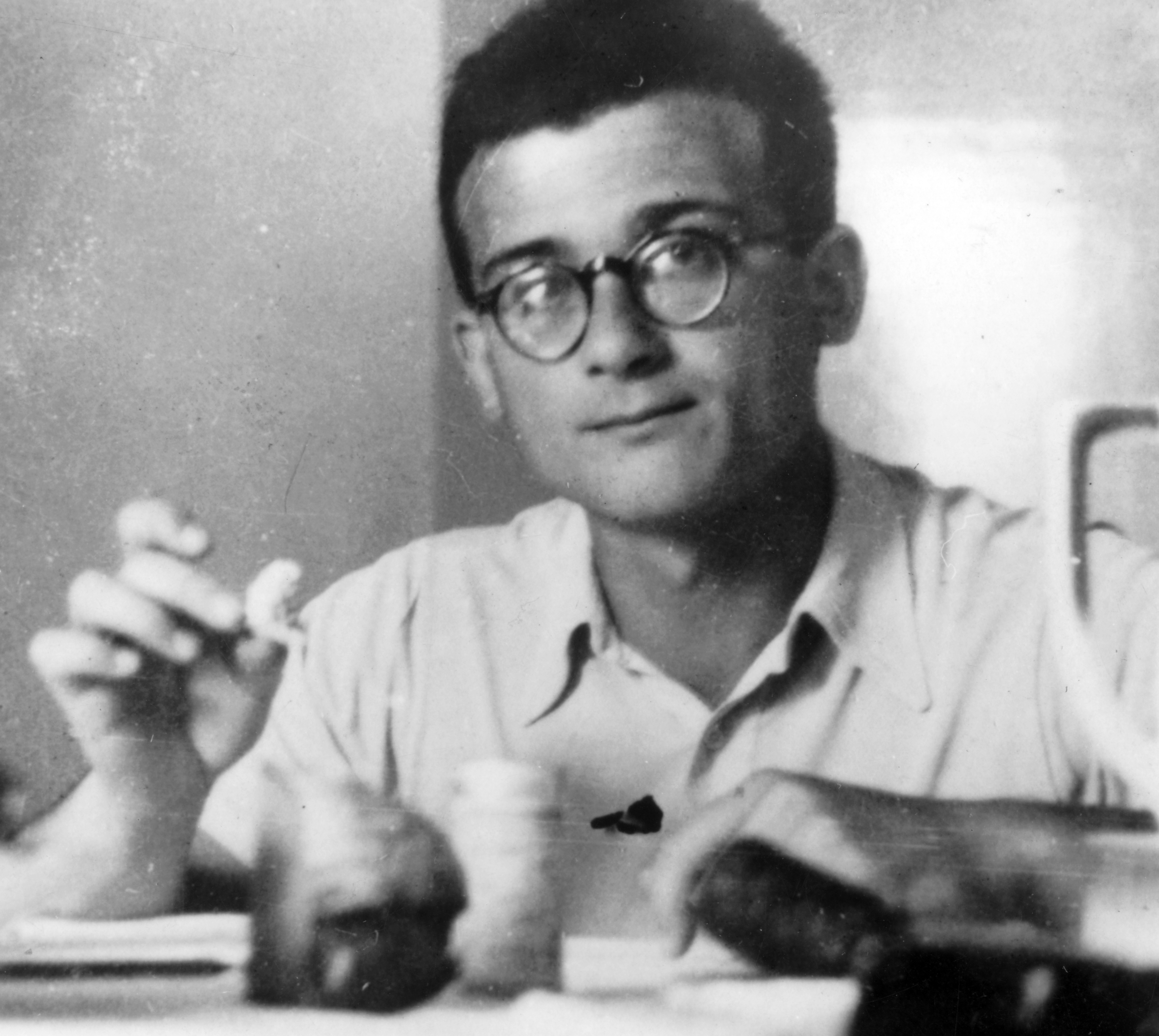
- Endre Ságvári in 1939.
- Born: November 4, 1913; Budapest, Transleithania, Austria-Hungary
- Died: July 27, 1944 (aged 30); Budapest, Kingdom of Hungary
- Burial place: Fiume Road Graveyard
- Education: Royal Hungarian Pázmány Péter University (1936)
- Occupation: Lawyer
- Spouse: Magda Bachrach
- Parent(s): Dr. Sándor Ságvár; Rozália Erdős

Endre Ságvári (born Endre Spitzer; 4 November 1913 – 27 July 1944), was a Hungarian lawyer, communist and anti-fascist activist.

== Biography ==
Ságvári was born into a Jewish family in Budapest. He became interested in Marxism as a student, and joined the Social Democratic Party of Hungary (MSZDP). In 1936 he graduated from the Faculty of Law of the Eötvös Loránd University. In 1940, he left the MSZDP for the then illegal Hungarian Communist Party (MKP). From the 1930s, Ságvári participated in the organization of anti-war demonstrations, and after the German occupation of Hungary during World War II, he joined the underground resistance. Eventually, Ságvári was tracked down by the authorities, and in July 1944 he was surrounded by four gendarmes in a café in Budapest. After pulling his gun on the gendarmes and wounding three of them, he was shot to death.

== Legacy ==
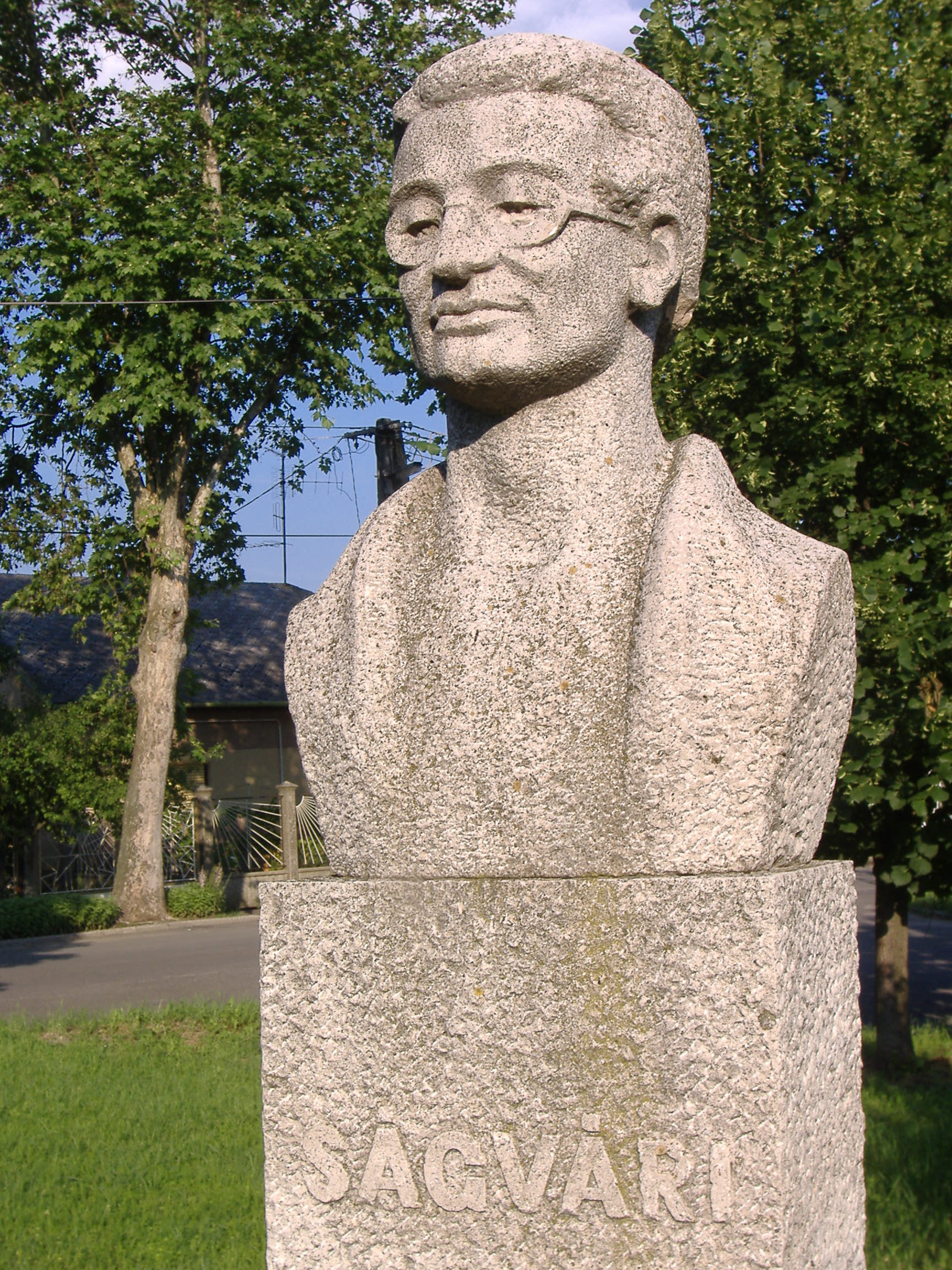
Statue of Endre Ságvári in Makó.

During the years of the Hungarian People's Republic, Ságvári was highlighted as a legendary leader and martyr of the anti-fascist cause, with several streets and institutions being named after him as well as monuments being erected to his memory. László Kristóf, one of the gendarmes involved in the killing of Ságvári, was arrested, sentenced to death, and hanged in 1959.

After the fall of communism, attempts have been made to portray Ságvári as an ordinary criminal rather than an anti-fascist martyr; streets named after him have been renamed, and monuments and other memorials to him have been removed and taken down. In 2006, the conviction of László Kristóf was overturned. This process has been criticized by oppositional forces in Hungary, with Tamás Krausz, professor of history at the Eötvös Loránd University in Budapest, writing that the post-communist portrayal of Ságvári "reflects a wider tendency across eastern and central Europe to rehabilitate those who collaborated with the Nazis and prewar fascists, and criminalise those who resisted them."
