= György Rubovszky =

Hungarian lawyer and politician

Member of the National Assembly
- In office 16 June 2003 – 21 June 2017
- In office 28 June 1994 – 14 May 2002

Personal details
- Born: 1 February 1944 Budapest, Hungary
- Died: 21 June 2017 (aged 73) Budapest, Hungary
- Party: KDNP (1989–1997; since 2002); Fidesz (1998–2002)
- Other political affiliations: MKDSZ
- Children: 2
- Profession: jurist, politician

György Rubovszky (1 February 1944 – 21 June 2017) was a Hungarian lawyer and politician, Member of Parliament from 1994 to 2002 and from 2003 until his death in 2017.

== Family and studies ==
Rubovszky was born in Budapest into a family of lawyers. He finished his secondary studies at the Eötvös József Secondary Grammar School in 1962. He earned his law degree in evening courses at the Faculty of Law of the Eötvös Loránd University in 1970. Following that he became a trainee lawyer. After passing the professional examination in 1972, he worked for the No. 14 Attorneys' Working Community. He functioned as head of the organization from 1977 to 1991. After that he opened his independent lawyer praxis.

He became a member of the Hungarian Lawyers Association in 1986, then Independent Lawyers' Forum in 1988, the latter one played an important role in the democratic transformation in 1989–90.

Ruboszky's late wife, with whom he had two daughters, was also a lawyer. One of his daughters is Csilla Jenei-Rubovszky, also a KDNP member and deputy mayor of Belváros-Lipótváros (District V, Budapest). Rubovszky's younger sister is Éva Rubovszky, Chairperson of the cultural organization Nemzetek Háza, who married graphic artist and film director Marcell Jankovics.

== Political career ==
In June 1989, Rubovszky participated in the refoundation of the Christian Democratic People's Party (KDNP), then elected deputy leader of its 2nd district of Budapest branch. He did not gain a mandate during the 1990 parliamentary election. He was a member of the General Assembly of Budapest from 1990 to 1994. In 1991, he was appointed Chairman of the KDNP's Budapest branch, serving in this capacity until 1992. In November 1992, he became a member of the national presidium of the party. In the General Assembly, he served as Vice Chairman of the Social Affairs and Housing Committee. He was Executive Secretary of the KDNP from 1992 to 1994.

During the 1994 parliamentary election, he was elected Member of Parliament from his party's national list. He was a member of the Constitutional, Statute Preparation, Justice and Standing Orders Committee from 28 June 1994 to 21 July 1997 and from 4 November 1997 to 17 June 1998. He was also a member of the Constitutional Preparatory Committee between 13 June 1995 and 21 July 1997. During these years, the KDNP had disintegrated as a result of internal party struggles and rivalries. Rubovszky, among several other party members, was expelled from the Christian Democratic People's Party and its parliamentary group on 21 July 1997, after that he joined the Fidesz-ally Hungarian Christian Democratic Alliance (MKDSZ). Officially he became an independent MP until September 1997, when he joined the Fidesz parliamentary group. Rubovszky became a member of the party itself in September 1998, and was appointed member of the National Board in March 2000.

Rubovszky was elected MP from the Budapest Regional List of Fidesz in the 1998 parliamentary election. He served as Vice Chairman of the Constitutional and Justice Committee between 1998 and 2002, beside that he was also a member of the Standing Orders Committee (1998–99), then Budget and Finance Committee (1999–2002). He also functioned as a member of the National Judicial Council (OIT) between 1999 and 2002. He lost his parliamentary seat during the 2002 parliamentary election. In November 2002, the Metropolitan Court restored the unity of the KDNP and repealed Rubovszky's exclusion. He joined the party then and left Fidesz. On 16 June 2003, he was elected MP again and joined Fidesz parliamentary group, replacing László Varga who died on 17 May 2003. In this parliamentary term, he was a member of the Constitutional and Justice Committee from 2003 to 2006 and Immunity, Incompatibility and Credentials Committee from 2004 to 2006.

After the 2006 parliamentary election, he joined the newly established KDNP parliamentary group and was appointed as its deputy leader. He was a member of the Constitutional, Judicial and Standing Orders Committee. During the 2010 parliamentary election, he became MP from Somogy County Regional List of the Fidesz–KDNP party alliance. He served as Chairman of the Committee on Immunity, Incompatibility and Mandate between 14 May 2010 and 5 May 2014. He was also a member of the Constitutional Preparation Committee from 2010 to 2011. Therefore, he participated in the drawing up of the new constitution in 2011. After the 2014 parliamentary election, he became Chairman of the Justice Committee.

Rubovszky died on 21 June 2017 at the age of 73. He was replaced as Member of Parliament by Gergely Gaal in September 2017.
