= Tamás Sulyok =

President of Hungary from 2024 to 2026

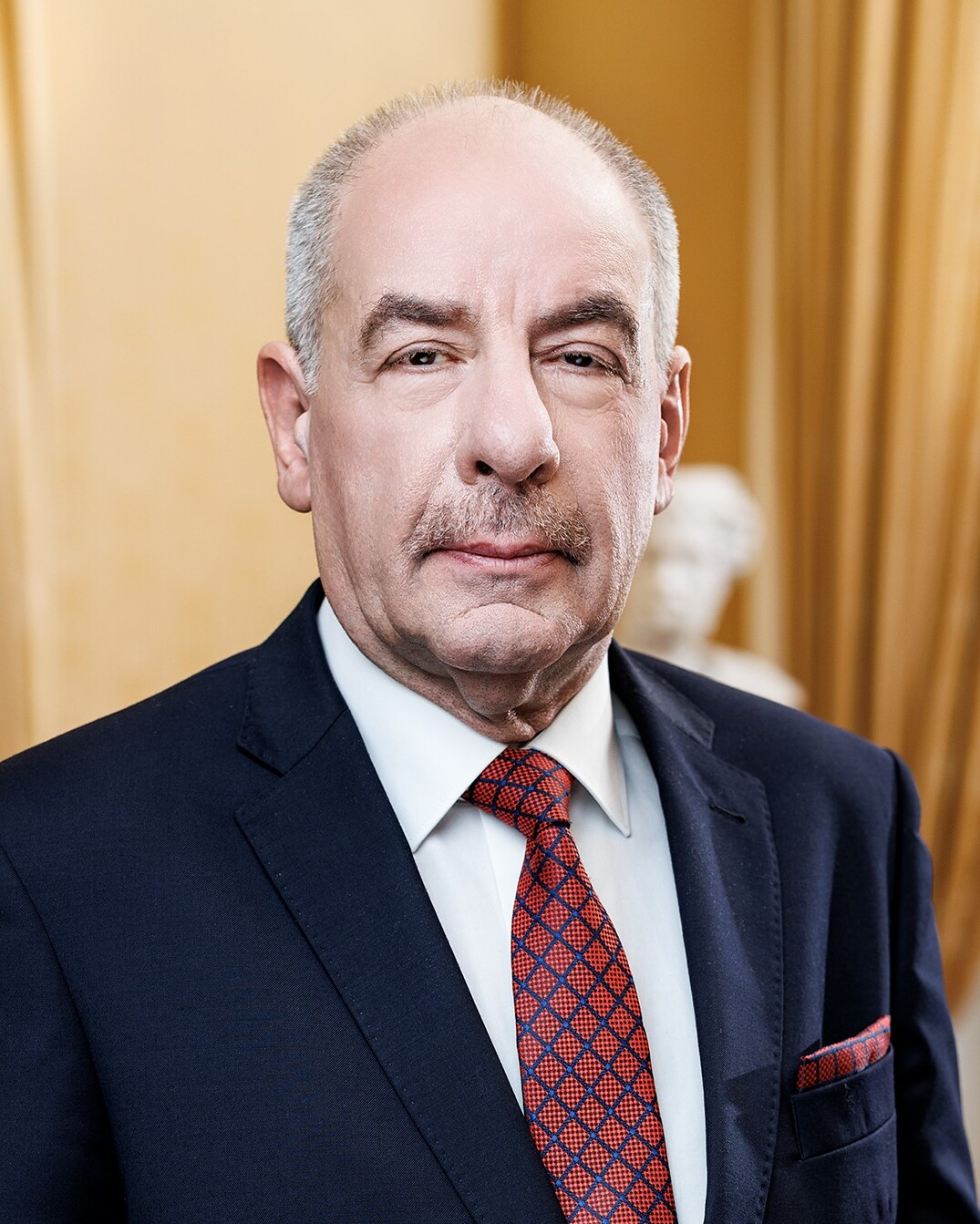
- Official portrait, 2024

President of Hungary
- In office 5 March 2024 – 20 July 2026
- Prime Minister: Viktor Orbán; Péter Magyar
- Preceded by: Katalin Novák (Note: László Kövér served as acting president between Novák's resignation and Sulyok's assumption of office.)
- Succeeded by: András Baka (Note: Ágnes Forsthoffer served as acting president between the end of Sulyok's term and Baka's assumption of office.)

President of the Constitutional Court
- In office 22 November 2016 – 4 March 2024
- Appointed by: National Assembly
- Preceded by: Barnabás Lenkovics
- Succeeded by: Imre Juhász

Justice of the Constitutional Court
- In office 27 September 2014 – 4 March 2024
- Appointed by: National Assembly

Austrian Honorary Consul in Hungary
- In office 2000–2014

Personal details
- Born: 24 March 1956 (age 70) Kiskunfélegyháza, Hungarian People's Republic
- Party: Independent
- Spouse: Zsuzsanna Nagy
- Relations: Ignác János Sulyok (uncle)
- Children: 2
- Education: University of Szeged
- Occupation: Lawyer; politician

Tamás Sulyok (Note: Hungarian pronunciation: [ˈtɒmaːʃ ˈʃujok]) (born 24 March 1956) is a Hungarian politician and lawyer who served as the president of Hungary from 2024 to 2026 and the president of the Constitutional Court of Hungary from 2016 until 2024.

Sulyok was elected in a snap vote after his predecessor Katalin Novák was implicated in a pedophile pardon scandal and resigned from office. Although officially a political independent, Sulyok was closely associated with Viktor Orbán's Fidesz party while in office, after being nominated and elected by the then-ruling Fidesz–KDNP parliamentary majority. Consequently, in 2026, after the Tisza Party won a parliamentary supermajority on a platform pledging the dismissal of Sulyok and other Orbán-era appointees, the National Assembly passed a constitutional amendment ending Sulyok's term and triggering a new presidential election.

== Family background ==
Tamás Sulyok was born in Kiskunfélegyháza on 24 March 1956 as the fourth and youngest child of lawyer László Sulyok (1909–1988) and economics teacher Márta Boleszny. He has two elder brothers, who are also lawyers, and a sister, who became a food engineer. László Sulyok practiced as a lawyer in Székesfehérvár since 1937. He married Márta Boleszny in 1941. Tamás' paternal uncle was Cistercian friar and librarian Ignác János Sulyok (1911–2006), who served as prior of Zirc Abbey from 1991 to 2004. His paternal grandparents were city police commissioner János Sulyok (1871–1963) and Anna Knittelhoffer (1886–1974), who married in 1904. His maternal grandparents were secondary school principal Antal Boleszny and school teacher Róza Kuntz.

Tamás Sulyok stated that his great-uncle was Dezső Sulyok, a prominent post-war politician, however, this is not supported by publicly available documents.

During a 2023 interview, Tamás Sulyok claimed that his father was sentenced to death in absentia by the People's Tribunal after World War II, because, as a divorce lawyer, he took on the case of a woman whose ex-husband later became the Communist party secretary of the city. His father hid in Eastern Hungary for a decade to avoid execution. However, researches of historians László Karsai, Krisztián Ungváry and Anna Gergely, which published shortly after Sulyok's taking office, question the veracity of this statement. Accordingly, László Sulyok was a member of the pro-Nazi and anti-Semitic Hungarian National Socialist Party led by Fidél Pálffy and László Baky, who were convicted of war crimes and executed after WW2. Sulyok served as head of the party's Fejér County branch during the war years. Anna Gergely presented four documents which prove that, in the summer of 1944, László Sulyok and his associates, in an official letter bearing their own signature, requested from Lajos Kerekes, the mayor of Székesfehévár the allocation of the apartments of the deported Jews to their party organization, as well as the provision of "Jewish furniture" According to the documents, their request was partially granted. There is no trace either that László Sulyok was ever sentenced to death.

Tamás Sulyok initially denied the charges stating that his late father "was a socially sensitive, patriotic, philo-Semitic man". He explained his previous statements with the so-called family legendarium. Remembering the 80th anniversary of the Holocaust in April 2024, he has already said that he was shaken by what has been revealed to him in public in recent weeks about the past of his father, who died almost 40 years ago. "I now bow my head before all the victims of the Holocaust, taking on the past, my own, personal past," he said.

== Legal career ==
Sulyok graduated in law from the Faculty of Political Science and Law of the József Attila University of Szeged in 1980. He began his career as a court draftsman at the Csongrád County Court. He passed the bar exam in 1982 and worked as a legal advisor until 1991. He worked as lawyer of the Sulyok–Japport law firm from 1991 to 1996, then Sulyok & Ádám law firm since 1997. In this capacity, he served as the legal representative of the Szeged local government office between 1998 and 2002, under mayor László Bartha (Fidesz). Simultaneously, he also functioned as the legal representative of the property management company that operated the city's assets. During the 2002 municipal elections, he was one of the local intellectuals, who supported the independent mayoral candidate Elemér Balogh, also backed by Fidesz. Although Sulyok was never a party member, he was among the local Fidesz intellectual supporters by that time. The Sulyok & Ádám law firm represented the party or its affiliated companies in several cases in Szeged.

He served as a honorary consul of Austria from 2000 to 2014. Sulyok he obtained a European law specialist qualification from the Law Continuing Education Institute of the Faculty of Law of the Eötvös Loránd University (ELTE) in 2004. He had been teaching constitutional law as an invited lecturer, holding seminars and optional collegiums at the Faculty of Law of the University of Szeged since September 2005. He obtained a PhD degree from the University of Szeged in 2013. His research topics include the constitutional status of the lawyer profession in Hungary, the regulations on the internal market of the European Union and the connections between legal services.

In May 2024, Democratic Coalition politician Klára Dobrev accused Sulyok, presenting authentic documents, of having participated in the transfer of Hungarian farmlands to Austrian entrepreneurs and companies in the early 2000s, circumventing the relevant legal prohibition through legal loopholes. She handed over the documents supporting her accusations to the prosecutor's office, adding the comment that "[...] whatever Chief Prosecutor Péter Polt does with the documents, it will not change the fact that Tamás Sulyok committed crimes." Subsequently, in June 2024, the Szeged Regional Investigative Prosecutor's Office rejected Dobrev's complaint for abuse of office, fraud and other crimes.

=== Constitutional Court judge ===
Sulyok was appointed as a judge of the Constitutional Court of Hungary in 2014 and became its head in 2016. During his tenure, he oversaw several controversial rulings such as those involving the rights of teachers to go on strike.

== Business career ==
Beside his legal career, Sulyok also had commercial interests. Shortly after the "regime change" in 1989–1990, he founded his company Selco in Szeged, which later operated in Budapest, Kecskemét and Siófok too. Selco initially sold cookware sets, combined with demonstration cooking, and then opened stores selling all kinds of products that were considered trendy at the time, from jewelry to videocassettes to quality spirits, while the company also profited from currency trading. Selco was operated as an MLM system and was eventually shut down in 1992 or 1993 after it was discovered that their agents had sold without a license in many cases. Later, in response to criticism, the Constitutional Court commented on Sulyok's interest at the time by stating that "his company did not unlawfully harm anyone."

== Presidency (2024–2026) ==
In February 2024, he became the nominee of the Fidesz party for President following the resignation of Katalin Novák due to uproar over her pardoning of an associate in a sexual abuse case. His nomination was approved in a two-thirds vote (134 in favor, 5 against and 60 leaving the chamber in protest) by the National Assembly on 26 February, with support from Fidesz and its coalition partner, the Christian Democratic People's Party, after which he took his oath of office, although he would not be formally assuming the position until 5 March. Opposition parties criticized his nomination, describing Sulyok as politically inexperienced, and held a rally in Budapest on 25 February calling for direct presidential elections.

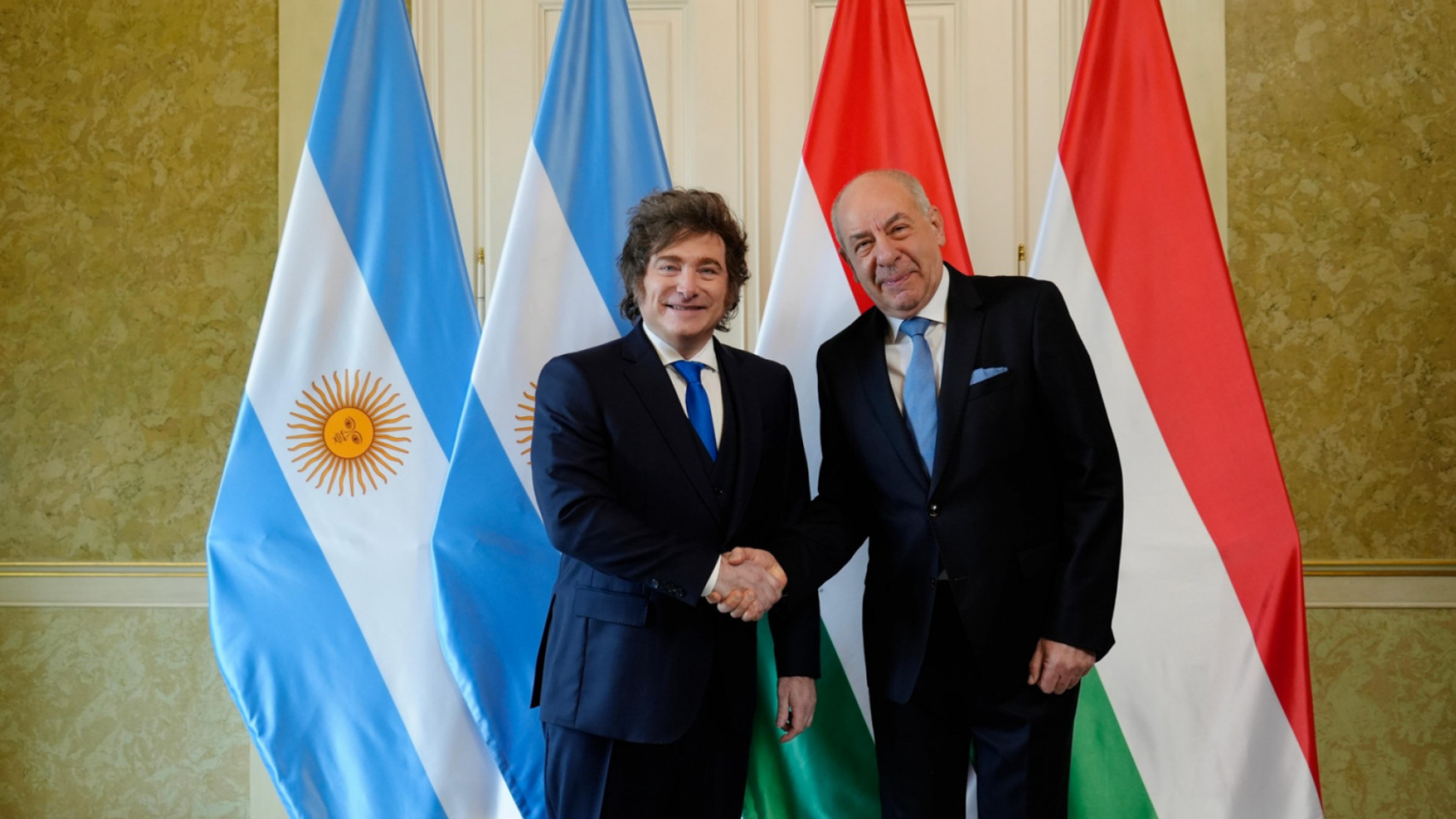
Sulyok (right) with Argentine president Javier Milei in March 2026

In his inaugural address, Sulyok expressed his intent to be a follower of the letter of the law who would seek to refrain from engaging in Hungary’s political life. He also denounced the sanctions and procedures initiated by the European Union against Hungary over concerns in the rule of law and democratic governance, saying that "the correctly defined concept of the rule of law is being lost, transformed from an ideal into an idol in today's Europe as part of a purely utilitarian political approach", and emphasizing that EU member states should retain their legal national sovereignty.

Upon assuming office, his first act as president was to sign a bill approving the accession of Sweden to the North Atlantic Treaty Organization on 5 March.

In December 2025, the Orbán government changed the law to make it more difficult to remove the President of the Republic. Previously, a simple majority could declare the president unable to fulfill his duties, temporarily passing his powers to the Speaker of Parliament. The new law required a two-thirds majority as well as the approval of the Constitutional Court to suspend the president's powers. This change, requested by Sulyok himself, was widely seen as an attempt to protect Sulyok's position in the event of a victory for the then-opposition Tisza Party, which was leading independent polls.

=== Dispute with Péter Magyar ===
In the 2026 Hungarian parliamentary election, the Tisza Party under Péter Magyar won a two-thirds supermajority in Parliament. During the election campaign, Magyar had repeatedly promised to remove Sulyok and other major Orbán-era officials if Tisza won a two-thirds majority, accusing them of aiding the "dismantling the rule of law ‌and democracy." Magyar claimed Sulyok was "unworthy of embodying the unity of the Hungarian nation." In the weeks after winning the election and in his inaugural address as Prime Minister on 9 May 2026, Magyar repeatedly demanded that Sulyok resign by 31 May. He threatened to use his party's parliamentary supermajority to remove the president otherwise.

On 4 July 2026, Magyar introduced the seventeenth amendment to the Fundamental Law of Hungary in the National Assembly, one clause of which would remove Sulyok from office immediately upon the amendment entering into effect. Sulyok and the opposition claimed this proposal violated the principles of democracy and of the rule of law. Sulyok argued: "removing public office holders in a manner that openly violates the rule of law ... inflicts a deep wound on the constitutional values of democracy".

Magyar argued instead that it was necessary to remove "puppets" of the former government who had "done nothing to oppose the dismantling of the rule of law and democracy" in order to "free our country from the captivity of the political and economic mafia that has ruled for the past 16 years."

On 10 July 2026, Fidesz supporters held a rally in Budapest protesting against efforts by the government to oust Sulyok.

=== Removal from office ===
On 13 July 2026, the National Assembly adopted the seventeenth amendment; Fidesz lawmakers boycotted the vote. Under the Fundamental Law, Sulyok had five days to sign the amendment or refer it to the Constitutional Court, which would have only been able to conduct a procedural review. Magyar said that if Sulyok were to refuse to sign the amendment, this would constitute a violation of the Fundamental Law for which the National Assembly would impeach him. Sulyok signed the amendment on 18 July, ending his term and triggering a presidential election. His removal from office went into effect on 20 July.

== Awards and honours ==
- Sovereign Military Order of Malta: Collar of the Order pro Merito Melitensi (17 September 2024)
- Kazakhstan: First Class of the Order of Friendship (2 October 2025)

== Notes ==
Legal offices
Preceded by Barnabás Lenkovics	President of the Constitutional Court; 2016–2024	Succeeded by Imre Juhász
Political offices
Preceded by Katalin Novák	President of Hungary; 2024–2026	Succeeded by András Baka
