= Gábor Máté =

Gábor Máté may refer to:

- Gábor Máté (athlete) (born 1979), Hungarian discus thrower
- Gábor Máté (actor) (born 1955), Hungarian actor
- Gabor Maté (born 1944), Hungarian-born Canadian physician and author

== See also ==
- Gábor Máthé (disambiguation)
