= Pál Sonnevend =

Hungarian constitutional lawyer (born 1971)

President of the Constitutional Court of Hungary
- Incumbent
- Assumed office 2 November 2026
- Preceded by: Péter Polt

Judge of the Constitutional Court of Hungary
- Incumbent
- Assumed office 28 July 2026
- Nominated by: Tisza Party
- Preceded by: Csaba Hende

Personal details
- Born: 16 November 1971 (age 54) Budapest, Hungary
- Education: ELTE Faculty of Law; Ruprecht Karl University of Heidelberg

Pál Sonnevend (born 16 November 1971) is a Hungarian lawyer specializing in constitutional law and international law. In July 2026, he was elected onto the Constitutional Court of Hungary, serving as its President since November 2026.

== Biography ==
Pál Sonnevend was born on 16 November 1971 in Budapest. He graduated from ELTE Faculty of Law in 1995. In 1996, Sonnevend obtained a Master of Laws degree from the Ruprecht Karl University of Heidelberg. He conducted comparative research in constitutional law and international law at the Max Planck Institute in Heidelberg. In 2005, he defended his doctoral dissertation, Eigentumsschutz und Sozialversicherung, at the university in Heidelberg.

Between 1997 and 2000, Sonnevend worked for László Sólyom at the Constitutional Court of Hungary, then from 2000 to 2010, he worked for the Office of the President of Hungary for Sólyom and Ferenc Mádl. Since 1998, he has been teaching at the Department of International Law at ELTE, serving as its head between 2016 and 2025. Since 2013, he is a member of the Court of Conciliation and Arbitration. Since 2019, he is the dean of the ELTE Faculty of Law. He represented Hungary before the International Court of Justice and has also appeared in several cases before the European Court of Human Rights and the Court of Justice of the European Union.

In July 2026, Sonnevend was elected onto the Constitution Court in the place of Csaba Hende. He took office on 28 July. In November 2026, the members of the Court elected Sonnevend as its President.

Legal offices
Preceded by Csaba Hende	Judge of the Constitutional Court; 2026–	Incumbent
Preceded by Péter Polt	President of the Constitutional Court; 2026–	Incumbent
