= Félix Mathé =

French politician (1834–1911)

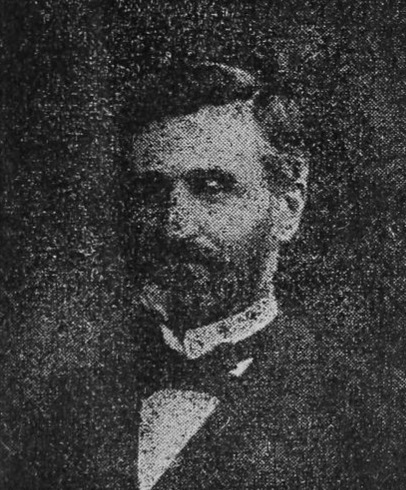
- Félix Mathé
- Born: 20 November 1834; Moulins, Allier, Auvergne, France
- Died: 27 August 1911 (aged 76); Moulins, Allier, Auvergne, France
- Occupation: Politician
- Relatives: Antoine Félix Mathé (uncle); Henri Mathé (brother)

Félix Mathé (1834–1911) was a French politician.

== Early life ==
Félix Mathé was born on 20 November 1834 in Moulins, Auvergne, rural France. His father died when he was three years old, and he was adopted by his paternal uncle, Antoine Félix Mathé. He had a brother, Henri Mathé.

== Career ==
He served as a member of the Chamber of Deputies from 1883 to 1895.

== Death ==
He died on 27 August 1911 in Moulins, Auvergne.
