= Antoine Félix Mathé =

French politician (1808–1882)

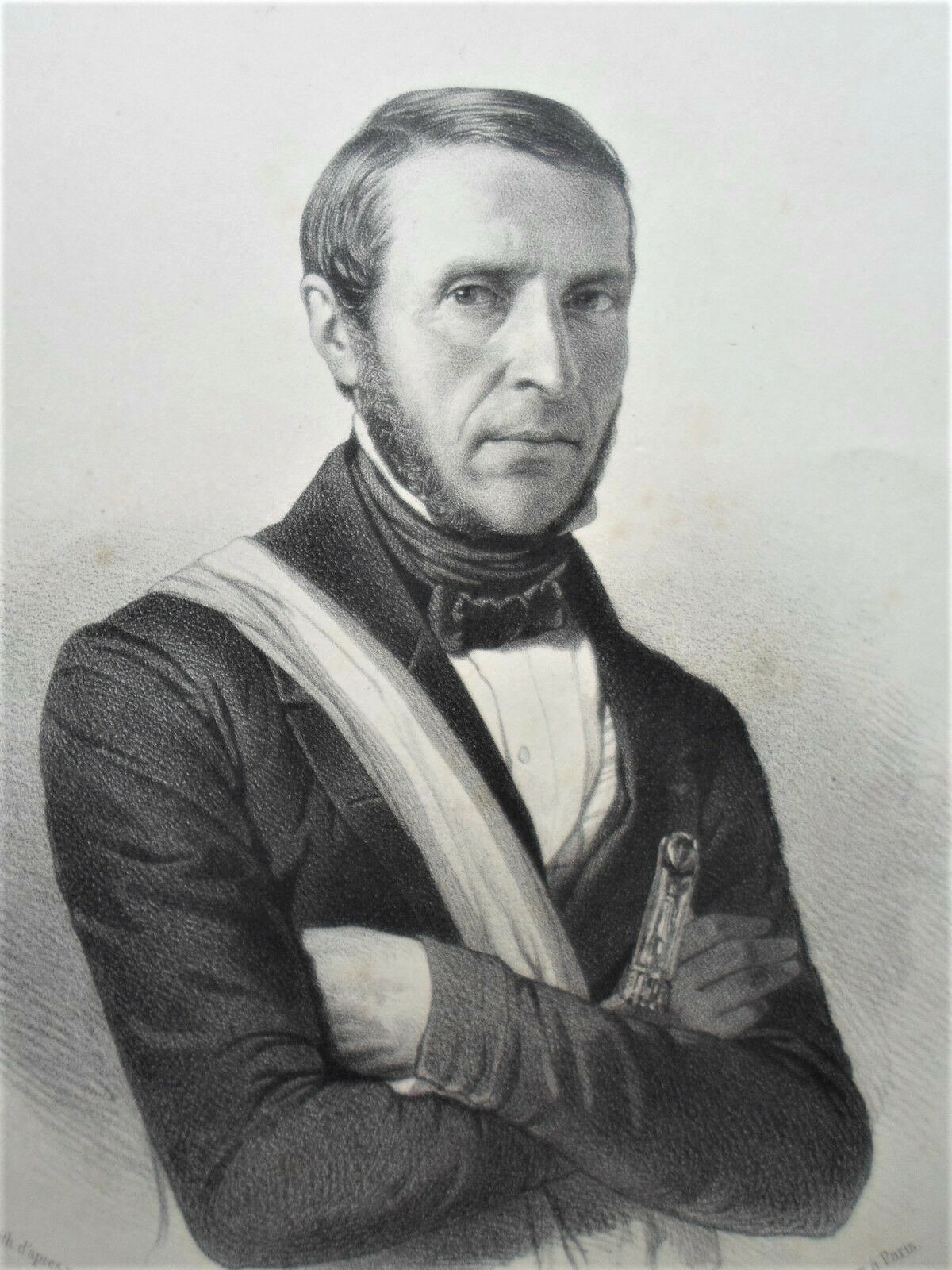
- Born: May 18, 1808; Cosne-d'Allier, Allier, Auvergne, France
- Died: March 5, 1882 (aged 73); Moulins, Allier, Auvergne, France
- Occupation: Politician
- Relatives: Henri Mathé (nephew); Félix Mathé (nephew)

Antoine Félix Mathé (May 18, 1808 – March 5, 1882) was a French politician.

He was born on May 18, 1808, in Cosne-d'Allier, Auvergne, rural France. He served as a member of the Chamber of Deputies from 1848 to 1851. He was far left.

Mathé died on March 5, 1882, in Moulins, Auvergne.
