= Péter Szalay (jurist) =

Hungarian jurist (1960–2024)

Member of the Constitutional Court
- In office 1 September 2011 – 1 September 2023

Personal details
- Born: 25 February 1960 Hungary
- Died: 14 March 2024 (aged 64) Budapest, Hungary
- Education: Eötvös Loránd University
- Occupation: Jurist

Péter Szalay (25 February 1960 – 14 March 2024) was a Hungarian jurist who served as a member of the Constitutional Court where he served a single 12-year term from 2011 until 2023. Prior to his appointment, he worked closely with Imre Pozsgay and the Ministry of Justice alongside working as a law professor.

Szalay died on 14 March 2024, at the age of 64.
