= Henri Mathé =

French politician

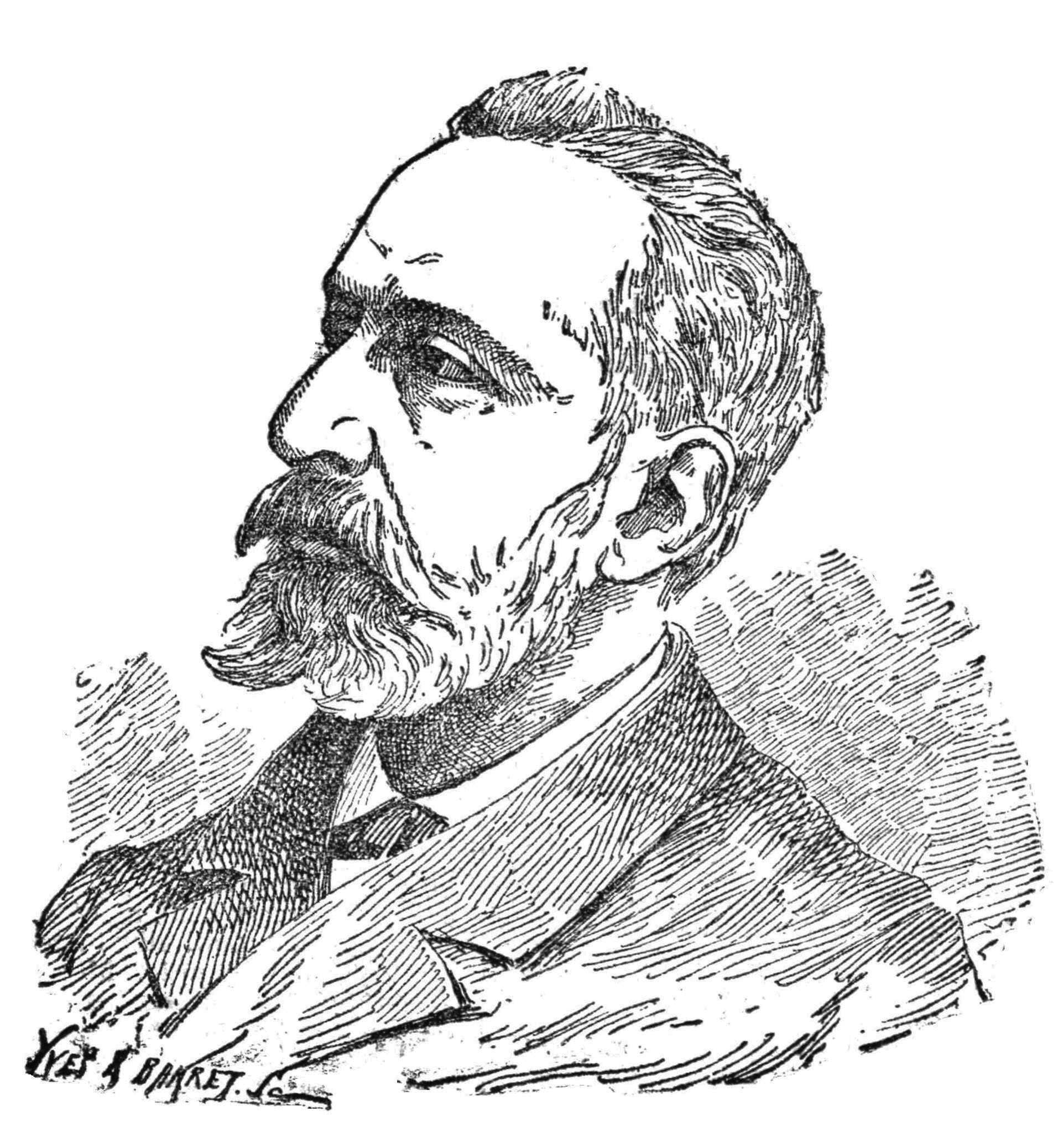
- Born: May 27, 1837; Moulins, Allier, Auvergne, France
- Died: October 27, 1907 (aged 70); Paris, France
- Education: ESCP Europe
- Occupation: Politician
- Spouse: Jeanne Elisa Billot
- Parent(s): Charles Lucien Mathé; Marie Esther Bigot
- Relatives: Antoine Félix Mathé (paternal uncle); Félix Mathé (brother)

Henri Mathé (1837-1907) was a French politician.

== Early life ==
Henri Mathé was born on May 27, 1837, in Moulins, in rural France. His father died when he was three years old, and he was adopted by his paternal uncle, Antoine Félix Mathé. He had a brother, Félix Mathé.

He graduated from the ESCP Europe, a business school in Paris.

== Career ==
He served as a member of the Chamber of Deputies from 1885 to 1893.

== Personal life ==
He married Jeanne Elisa Billot.

== Death ==
He died on October 27, 1907, in Paris, France.
