= Péter Paczolay =

Hungarian academic (born 1956)

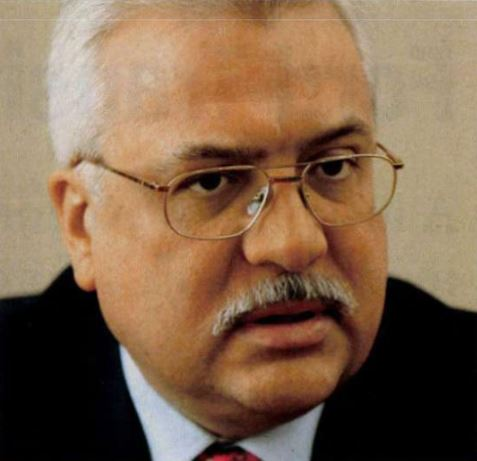
- Born: 20 May 1956 (age 70)
- Occupations: Jurist, academic
- Awards: János Csere Apáczai Prize (2004); Justitia Regnorum Fundamentum Award (2015); Grande Ufficiale dell'Ordine al Merito; Großes Verdienstkreuz mit Stern; Commandeur de l'Ordre National

Péter Paczolay (20 May 1956 in Budapest) is a Hungarian jurist, political scientist and university professor.

== Education and academic career ==
In 1975 Paczolay started his studies at the Faculty of Law of Eötvös Loránd University, where he obtained his law degree in 1980. He returned to the university in 1983, where he started working as a research fellow in the Department of Political Science and Legal Theory. In 1986, he became a full-time university lecturer as an associate professor, and in 1990 he moved to the Department of Political Science. In the meantime, in 1992, he was appointed Head of the Department of Political Science at the Faculty of Law and Political Sciences of the József Attila University. In 1994, he was elected Deputy Dean of the Faculty of Law and Political Sciences in Szeged, a post he held until 1998. From 1991 to 1992 he was a research fellow at the Woodrow Wilson Center in Washington, DC.

He obtained his doctorate in 1989 and his habilitation in 1999. He was elected a member of the Political Science Committee of the Hungarian Academy of Sciences. In 2002, he was elected a member of the European Academy of Sciences and Arts in Salzburg. In addition to his academic posts, he joined the newly established Constitutional Court in 1990 as one of its senior advisers. In 1996, he was appointed Secretary General of the body.

His research interests include the history of political theory, the history of the concept of state and law, comparative constitutionalism and the role of law in social governance.

He teaches Political Theory, History of Political Thought, Comparative Constitutional Law at the Faculty of Law and Political Science of the University of Szeged.

== Career in law ==
In 2000 he was appointed Deputy Head of the Office of the President of the Republic. At the Constitutional Court of Hungary, he was judge from 2006 to 2015, vice-president from 2007 to 2008 and President from 2008 to 2015.

From 2005 to 2013 he was a member of the Venice Commission of the Council of Europe. Between 2009 and 2011 he was vice-president of the commission, and in 2013 he was elected as Honorary President. In 2017, he was elected as a Hungarian judge at the European Court of Human Rights.

== Publications ==
His publications include:

- Paczolay Péter–Szabó Máté; A politikaelmélet rövid története; Kossuth, Bp., 1984
- Az egyetemes politikai gondolkodás története. Szöveggyűjtemény; szerk. Paczolay Péter, Szabó Máté; Tankönyvkiadó, Bp., 1990
- The New Hungarian Constitutional State: Challenges and Perspectives (1993)
- Alkotmánybíráskodás, alkotmányértelmezés; vál., szerk., előszó, bibliográfia Paczolay Péter; ELTE ÁJTK, Bp., 1995 (Jogfilozófiák)
- Paczolay Péter–Szabó Máté: A politikatudomány kialakulása. A politikaelmélet története az ókortól a huszadik századig; Korona, Bp., 1996
- The 10th Conference of the European Constitutional Courts. Budapest 6–9 May 1996, 1-4.; összeáll., szerk. Paczolay Péter és Bitskey Botond; Hungarian Constitutional Court, Bp., 1997
- Államelmélet I. Machiavelli és az államfogalom születése; Korona, Bp., 1998
- Alkotmánybíráskodás, alkotmányértelmezés; vál., szerk., bibliográfia Paczolay Péter; Rejtjel, Bp., 2003 (Rejtjel politológia könyvek)
- Az alkotmányelmélet fejlődése és az európai kihívás; Szent István Társulat, Bp., 2003 (Jogfilozófiák)
- Twenty years of the Hungarian Constitutional Court; szerk. Paczolay Péter, angolra ford. Dobrocsi Szilvia; Constitutional Court of the Republic of Hungary, Bp., 2009
- Hans Kelsen és az alkotmánybíráskodás európai modelljének fejlődése; in: Hans Kelsen jogtudománya. Tanulmányok Hans Kelsenről; vál., szerk., előszó, bev. Cs. Kiss Lajos; Gondolat–MTA Jogtudományi Intézet–ELTE ÁJK, Bp., 2007 (Bibliotheca iuridica Acta congressuum

== Awards ==
Paczolay was awarded the János Csere Apáczai Prize in 2004. He won the Justitia Regnorum Fundamentum Award in 2015. He was also awarded Grande Ufficiale dell'Ordine al Merito della Repubblica Italiana, Großes Verdienstkreuz mit Stern of the Order of Merit of the Federal Republic of Germany and Commandeur de l'Ordre National de la Légion d'Honneur in France.
