= Péter Polt =

Hungarian politician and lawyer

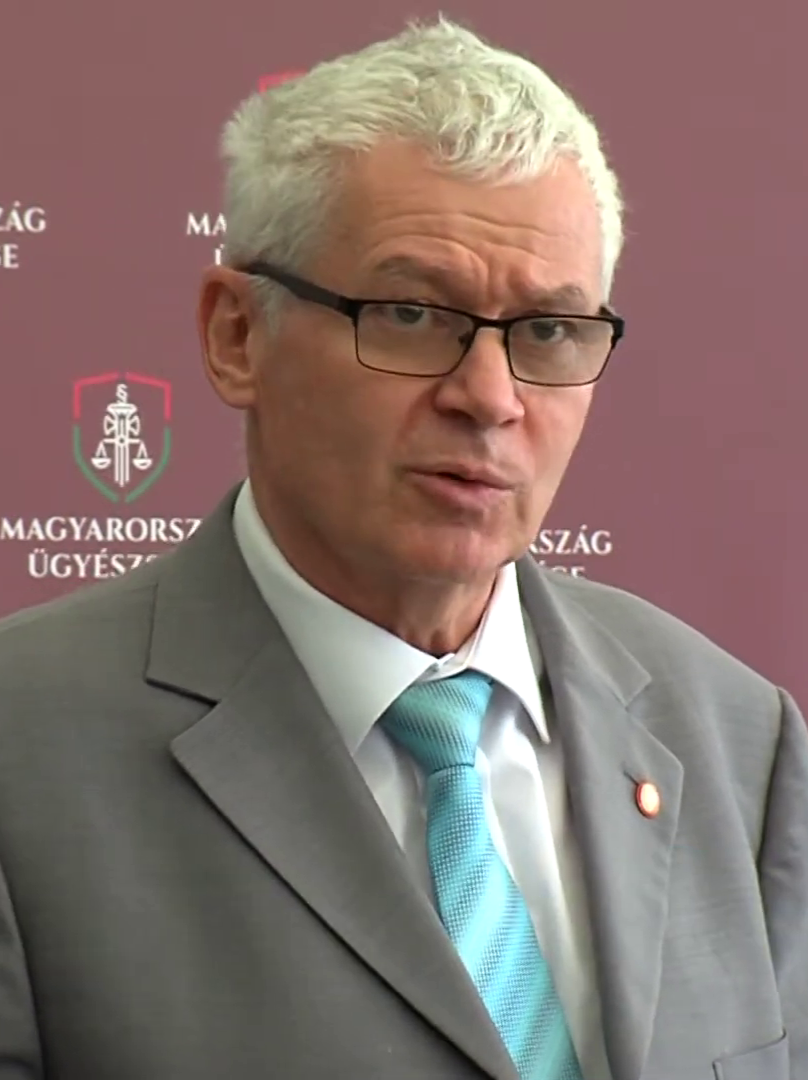

President of the Constitutional Court of Hungary
- In office 11 June 2025 – 31 August 2026
- Preceded by: Imre Juhász
- Succeeded by: Pál Sonnevend

Chief Prosecutor of Hungary
- In office 13 December 2010 – 9 June 2025
- Deputy: Ervin Belovics; Zsolt András Varga; Tibor Ibolya; István Lajtár
- Preceded by: Tamás Kovács
- Succeeded by: Gábor Bálint Nagy
- In office 16 May 2000 – 16 May 2006
- Deputy: Ervin Belovics; Zsolt András Varga
- Preceded by: Kálmán Györgyi
- Succeeded by: Tamás Kovács

Personal details
- Born: 6 September 1955 (age 71)
- Party: Fidesz
- Children: 3
- Education: Eötvös Loránd University (JD); Pázmány Péter Catholic University (PhD, Dr. habil.)
- Occupation: jurist

Péter Polt (born 6 September 1955) is a Hungarian politician and lawyer who served as the president of the Constitutional Court of Hungary from 2025 until 2026. He was the Chief Prosecutor of Hungary from 2000 until 2006 and between 2010 and 2025. He is one of the founders of Fidesz.

== Biography ==
He finished his secondary studies at the Veres Pálné Grammar School in Budapest. He graduated from the Faculty of Law of the Eötvös Loránd University in 1980. Besides that he participated in postgraduate courses in the University of Strasbourg and the Hague Academy of International Law. He worked for the National Institute of Criminology and Forensic. He became an assistant lecturer in the ELTE Department of Criminal Law in 1983. He was promoted to adjunct in 1985. He worked as a lawyer between 1985 and 1995 after completing the professional examination in 1992. He served as an advisor for the Ministry of Justice from 1990 to 1995. He received Ph.D from the Pázmány Péter Catholic University in 2010.

Polt joined Fidesz in 1993. He was a parliamentary candidate during the 1994 general election but did not secure a mandate.

He was appointed general deputy of Katalin Gönczöl, the Ombudsman for Civil Rights in 1995. As a result, he left the Fidesz party. In 2000 he was elected Chief Prosecutor by the National Assembly of Hungary, replacing Kálmán Györgyi. During his 6-year term he has been criticized several times. His response to the interpellations were repeatedly voted down in the plenary sessions. He was replaced by Tamás Kovács in 2006. After that he became Head of the Criminal Affairs Department of the General Prosecutor's Office.

President Pál Schmitt nominated Polt to the position of Chief Prosecutor in 2010. The Fidesz-KDNP parliamentary majority elected him for a 9-year term under the new rules. In 2011 Polt was elected Chairman of an organisation of European Union chief prosecutors. Polt told MTI over the phone that the organisation would provide recommendations to European prosecution offices about what priorities to pursue. He said another aim of the lobby group, set up four years ago, was to debate European issues affecting prosecutors.

Péter Polt was re-elected as Chief Prosecutor for another 9-year term by the Fidesz supermajority of the National Assembly on 4 November 2019. He received 134 votes, 24 MPs voted against him, and there were three invalid votes.

In 2026, after declining to resign from the Constitutional Court of Hungary, Polt was forced into retirement by the 17th amendment to the Fundamental Law of Hungary which re-established an age limit of 70. His term ended on 31 August 2026.

== Sources ==
- MTI Ki Kicsoda 2006, Magyar Távirati Iroda, Budapest, 2005, p. 1380.
- Polt Péter adatlapja az ELTE ÁJK honlapján
- Polt Péter 2000-es életrajza az Origo.hu-n
- Életrajz a Veres Pálné Gimnázium honlapján

Legal offices
Preceded by Kálmán Györgyi	Chief Prosecutor; 2000–2006	Succeeded by Tamás Kovács
Preceded by Tamás Kovács	Chief Prosecutor; 2010–2025	Succeeded by Gábor Bálint Nagy
Preceded by Imre Juhász	President of the Constitutional Court; 2025–2026	Succeeded by Pál Sonnevend
