= Gábor Máthé (lawyer) =

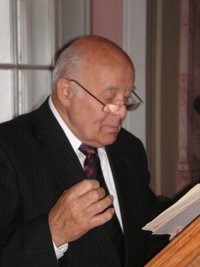
Gábor Máthé

Gábor Máthé (born 1941) is a Hungarian legal historian, professor, and president of the Hungarian Law Association.

== Career ==
He studied at Eötvös Loránd University where received his doctorate degree in law in 1967. He worked as a Scientific Associate of the university at MTA research center between 1967 and 1977.
