= Constitutional Court of Hungary =

Supreme interpreter of the Hungarian constitution

Coordinates: 47.5037°N 19.0365°E

- Magyarország Alkotmánybírósága
- Interactive map of Constitutional Court of Hungary
- Established: January 1, 1990; 36 years ago
- Jurisdiction: Hungary
- Location: Budapest
- Authorised by: Constitution of Hungary
- Judge term length: 9 years
- Number of positions: 15
- Language: Hungarian
- Website: alkotmanybirosag.hu

Chief Justice
- Currently: Pál Sonnevend
- Since: 2 November 2026

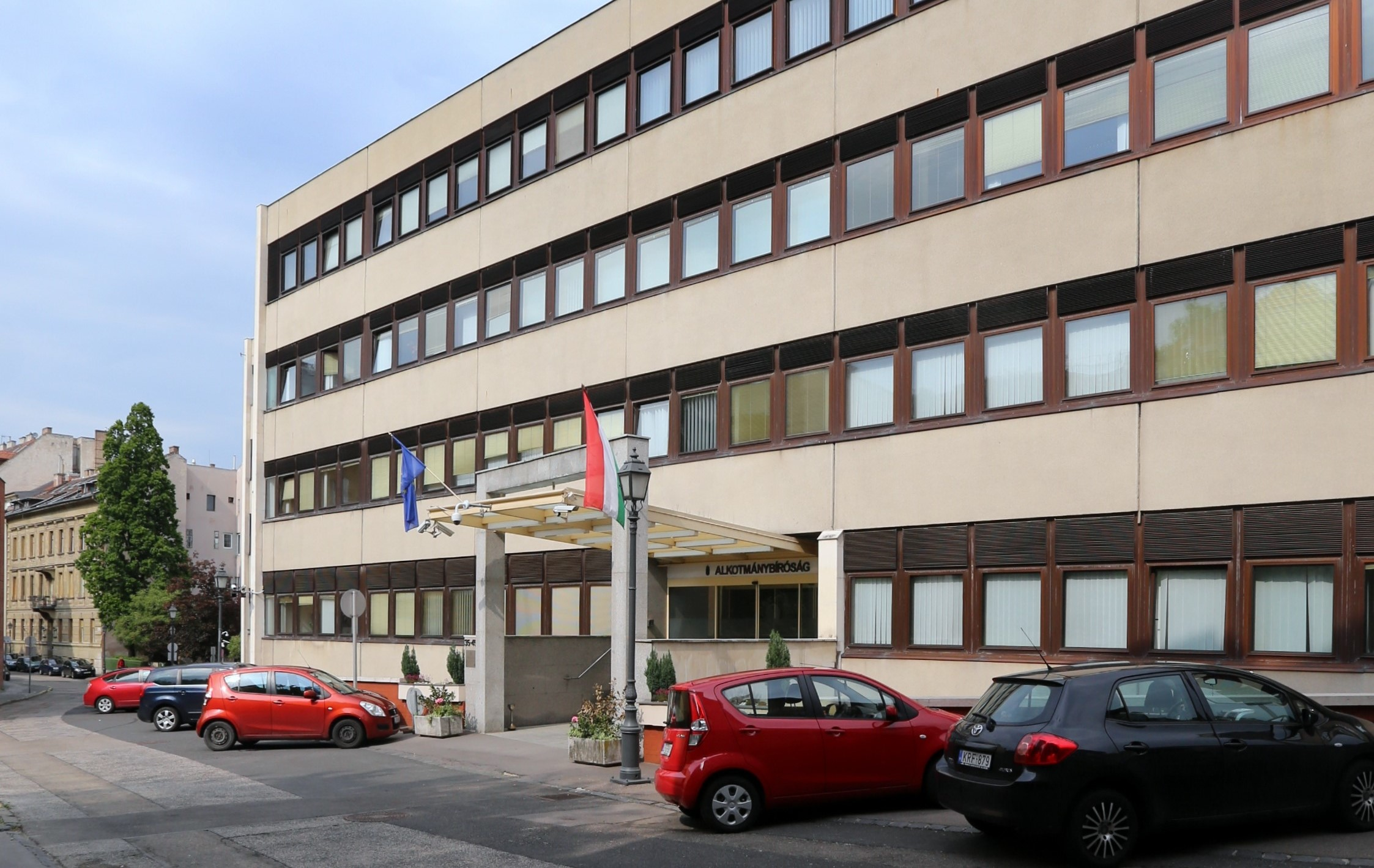
Constitutional Court of Hungary, Budapest

The Constitutional Court of Hungary (Hungarian: Magyarország Alkotmánybírósága) is a special court of Hungary, making judicial review of the acts of the Parliament of Hungary. The official seat of the Constitutional Court is Budapest. Until 2012 the seat was Esztergom.

The Constitutional Court is composed of 15 justices since September 1, 2011 (previously, the Court was composed of 11 justices). The members then elect the President of the Court (Chief Justice) from among its members in a secret ballot. One or two vice-presidents, appointed by the President of the Court, stand in for the President in the event of his absence for any reason. The constitutional court passes on the constitutionality of laws, and there is no right of appeal on these decisions. The Constitutional Court serves as the main body for the protection of the Constitution, its tasks being the review of the constitutionality of statutes, and the protection of constitutional order and fundamental rights guaranteed by the Constitution. The Constitutional Court performs its tasks independently. With its own budget and its justices being elected by Parliament it does not constitute a part of the ordinary judicial system.

== Establishment ==
On 19 October 1989, the Hungarian Parliament passed a resolution on the establishment of the Constitutional Court. Its organization and authority, however, had been determined earlier in the framework of the trilateral political roundtable negotiations preparing the democratic transformation of the political system. The basic provisions on the Constitutional Court were laid down in October 1989 by Parliament by way of amending the Constitution (Article 32/A). The court was set up in order to promote the establishment of a state governed by the rule of law as well as the protection of constitutional order and fundamental rights. Act XXXII of 1989 on the Constitutional Court was passed by Parliament on 19 October 1989, and the Constitutional Court started its work on 1 January 1990.

== Changes made by the 2011 Constitution ==
The following changes were drafted:

The Constitutional Court (Article 24.)

(1) The Constitutional Court shall be the main authority for constitutional protection.

(2) The Constitutional Court shall

a) review the constitutionality of laws adopted, but not yet published,

b) review at the request of a judge the constitutionality of legislation to be applied in an individual case,

c) on the basis of a constitutional complaint, review the constitutionality of legislation or a judicial decision applied in an individual case,

d) upon the initiative of the Government or one quarter of the Members of Parliament review the constitutionality of laws,

e) review the conflict of legislation with international treaties, and

f) perform other duties and authorities defined in the Constitution and in super majority laws.

(3) Acting pursuant to its jurisdiction in its competence under section b)-d) of paragraph (2), the Constitutional Court will annul laws and other legal norms, judicial decisions that it finds to be unconstitutional, pursuant to its jurisdiction under section e) of paragraph (2) annul laws or legal norms deemed to be in conflict with international treaties and will also rule on other issues set forth in super majority laws.

(4) Acting pursuant to its jurisdiction under section c)-d) of paragraph (2), the Constitutional Court shall review the constitutionality of laws on the State Budget and its implementation, on central taxes, fees and customs duties, pension and health care contributions, as well as on the content of the statues concerning uniform requirements on local taxes only if the petition refers exclusively to the right to life and human dignity, the right to the protection of personal data, the right to freedom of thought, conscience and religion or the right connected to the Hungarian citizenship, if the conditions defined for adopting and promulgating the law have not been met.

(5) The Constitutional Court is a body of 15 members, elected by Parliament for a period of twelve years by a two-thirds majority of the Members of Parliament. The Parliament will elect with a two-thirds majority of the Members of Parliament a President, with a mandate that lasts until the term of the judge's mandate. Members of the Constitutional Court may not be members of a political party and may not engage in any political activities.

== Chief Justices ==
- László Sólyom (July 1, 1990 – November 24, 1998)
- János Németh (November 24, 1998 – July 31, 2003)
- András Holló (August 1, 2003 – November 12, 2005)
- Mihály Bihari (November 12, 2005 – July 2, 2008)
- Péter Paczolay (July 3, 2008 – February 24, 2015)
- Barnabás Lenkovics (February 25, 2015 – April 21, 2016)
- Tamás Sulyok (April 21, 2016 – March 4, 2024)
- László Salamon (acting, March 4, 2024 – June 11, 2024)
- Imre Juhász (June 11, 2024 – June 11, 2025)
- Péter Polt (June 11, 2025 – August 31, 2026 )
- Ágnes Czine (acting, September 1, 2026 – November 2, 2026)
- Pál Sonnevend (November 2, 2026 – )

== Justices ==
The Hungarian Constitution declares that members of the Constitutional Court shall be elected by Parliament. It also determines the rules of such elections. Impartiality is guaranteed by having proposed members of the Constitutional Court to be put forward by a nominating committee consisting of one member each from the factions of parties represented in Parliament and shall be elected by a two-thirds majority of all Members of Parliament. Hungarian law provides that only jurists of outstanding theoretical knowledge or having at least twenty years of legal practice may be elected members of the Constitutional Court. Membership is for a term of nine years and members may be re-elected once. In December 2013, the upper age limit in place for Constitutional Court justices was abolished, but it was restored as 70 in July 2026.

The present composition of the court includes the following justices:

Justice	Born	Start of term
Ágnes Czine	1958	Nov 15, 2014
Attila Horváth	1959	Dec 1, 2016
Ildikó Hörcher Marosi	1964	Dec 1, 2016
Balázs Schanda	1968	Dec 1, 2016
Marcel Szabó	1970	Dec 1, 2016
Tünde Handó	1962	Jan 1, 2020
Zoltán Márki	1960	Jun 22, 2021
Réka Varga	1977	Sep 2, 2023
András Patyi	1969	Sep 2, 2023
Ákos Kozma	1972	Sep 26, 2025
Pál Sonnevend	1971	Jul 28, 2026
Nóra Chronowski	1974	Sep 16, 2026
András György Kovács	1973	Sep 16, 2026
Miklós Ligeti	1977	Sep 16, 2026
Zsolt Szomora	1980	Sep 16, 2026

== Democratic backsliding ==
On 1 March 2013, the Princeton University international constitutional law scholar and Hungary specialist Kim Lane Scheppele reported that the Hungarian ruling party's supermajority is re-introducing in one "mega-amendment" multiple constitutional amendments which had been introduced before and nullified by the Constitutional Court or changed at the insistence of European bodies. The new constitutional mega-amendment again puts an end to the independence of the judiciary, brings universities under still more governmental control, opens the door to political prosecutions, criminalizes homelessness, makes the recognition of religious groups dependent on their cooperation with the government and weakens human rights guarantees across the board. In addition, the constitution will now buffer the government from further financial sanctions by permitting it to pass on all fines for noncompliance with the constitution or with European law to the Hungarian population as special taxes, not payable by the normal state budget. The mega-amendment annuls all of the decisions made by the Court before 1 January 2012 so that they have no legal effect. Henceforth no longer can anyone in the country – neither the Constitutional Court, nor the ordinary courts, nor human rights groups nor ordinary citizens – rely on the Court's prior string of rights-protecting decisions.

On 5 March 2013, Michael Link, undersecretary in the German Foreign Ministry, in "Hungary must remain a country of the law," called on Hungary "to demonstrate that the country has an effective separation of power between the legislative and the judicial."

On 6 March 2013, Europe's main human rights watchdog, Council of Europe President Thorbjorn Jagland, said that the amendments set to be voted on next week by Hungarian lawmakers might have been incompatible with European legal principles and asked Hungary to postpone the approval of a series of constitutional amendments so legal experts can review the changes.

On 7 March 2013, Deputy Prime Minister Navracsics sent a letter to the Secretary General of the Council of Europe Thorbjorn Jagland, to give some additional written explanations to the Proposal on the Fourth Amendment to Fundamental Law of Hungary.

On 8 March 2013, the government of the United States raised its concerns both about the content of the proposed amendments "as they could threaten the principles of institutional independence and checks and balances that are the hallmark of democratic governance" and about the process by which they were to be accepted: "[The USA] urges the Government of Hungary and the Parliament to ensure that the process of considering amendments to the constitution demonstrates respect for the rule of law and judicial review, openness to the views of other stakeholders across Hungarian society, and continuing receptiveness to the expertise of the Council of Europe's Venice Commission."

On 8 March 2013, in a letter to the European Commission, Guido Westerwelle, the German foreign minister, and counterparts in Denmark, the Netherlands and Finland called for the European Union to be given new powers allowing it to freeze EU budget funds to a member state in breach of Europe's "fundamental values." On the same day, European Commission President Jose Manuel Barroso too expressed concerns to Prime Minister Viktor Orban over the amendment vote in Hungary's parliament next week to change the constitution, arguing it contravenes EU rules in areas such as the judiciary.

On 8 March 2013, Minister of Foreign Affairs, János Martonyi sent letter to the Ministers of Foreign Affairs of EU-member states, in which he gave details on the text of the amendment.

On 11 March 2013, "Hungary's parliament, dominated by Prime Minister Viktor Orban's Fidesz party, adopted changes to the country's constitution on Monday despite warnings from the European Union and the U.S. government that the changes could weaken Hungary's democracy. The legislation was supported by 265 lawmakers in the 386-seat chamber, with 11 votes against and 33 abstentions."

In The New York Times column of Nobel Laureate economist Paul Krugman, Princeton University international constitutional scholar and Hungary specialist Professor Kim Lane Scheppele writes:

"The Hungarian Parliament [on March 11, 2013] passed a 15-page amendment to its one-year-old constitution against a storm of protest from both home and abroad. If it is signed by the Hungarian President, János Áder, the "Fourth Amendment" will wipe out more than 20 years of Constitutional Court decisions protecting human rights and it will reverse concessions made to Europe over the last year of difficult bargaining as the Fidesz government has tightened its grip on power…. But Hungary's allies should see through the fog of amendment. By now it should be clear that Prime Minister Viktor Orbán and his Fidesz party recognize no limitations in their quest for power."

Critiques have also been made in the official working documents of the European Parliament and by the Venice Commission on Hungary.

== See also ==
- Supreme Court of Hungary
- Constitution
- Constitutionalism
- Constitutional economics
- Jurisprudence
- Judiciary
- Rule of law
- Rule According to Higher Law
