= List of heads of state of Hungary =

This article lists the heads of state of Hungary, from the Hungarian Declaration of Independence and the establishment of the Hungarian State in 1849 (during the Hungarian Revolution of 1848) until the present day.

The current head of state of Hungary is President of the Republic András Baka, former President of the Supreme Court. He was elected on 11 August 2026 and took office on 19 August 2026.

For earlier rulers, see Grand Prince of the Hungarians, King of Hungary and List of Hungarian monarchs.

== Hungarian State (1849) ==
Parties EP

No.	Portrait	Name (Birth–Death)	Term of office			Party
No.	Portrait	Name (Birth–Death)	Took office	Left office	Tenure	Party
Governor–President of the Hungarian State
1		Lajos Kossuth (1802–1894) also prime minister	14 April 1849	11 August 1849	119 days	Opposition Party (EP)
—		General; Artúr Görgei (1818–1916) acting	11 August 1849	13 August 1849	2 days	Revolutionary Army

After the collapse of the Hungarian Revolution of 1848, the restored Hungarian Kingdom became an integral part of the Austrian Empire until 1867, when dual Austro-Hungarian Monarchy was created and the Hungarian Kingdom was organized as Lands of the Crown of Saint Stephen.

== Lands of the Crown of Saint Stephen (1867–1918) ==
Name Reign Coronation	Portrait	Arms	Birth Parentage	Marriage(s) Issue	Death Burial	Notes
House of Habsburg-Lorraine (1867–1918)
Franz Joseph I 54th king of Hungary (Note: Franz Joseph I officially reigned as King of Hungary from 2 December 1848 but the National Assembly did not recognise his accession to the throne until 29 May 1867.) 29 May 1867 ┃ 21 November 1916 (49 years, 176 days) 8 June 1867; Buda			18 August 1830; Vienna Son of Archduke Franz Karl of Austria and Princess Sophie of Bavaria	Elisabeth of Bavaria; 24 April 1854; Vienna four children	21 November 1916; Vienna aged 86 Capuchin Crypt, Vienna, Archduchy of Austria	Nephew of Ferdinand V, grandson of Francis I
Charles IV; Blessed Charles; 55th king of Hungary 21 November 1916 ┃ 16 November 1918 (1 year, 360 days) 30 December 1916; Budapest			17 August 1887; Persenbeug-Gottsdorf Son of Archduke Otto of Austria and Princess Maria Josepha of Saxony	Zita of Bourbon-Parma; 21 October 1911; Schwarzau eight children	1 April 1922; Funchal aged 34 Church of Our Lady, Funchal, Portugal	Great-nephew of Francis Joseph I, second great grandson of Francis I

== Hungarian People's Republic (1918–1919) ==
Parties F48P–Károlyi

No.	Portrait	Name (Birth–Death)	Term of office			Party
No.	Portrait	Name (Birth–Death)	Took office	Left office	Tenure	Party
President of the People's Republic of Hungary
—		Count; Mihály Károlyi (1875–1955) also prime minister	16 November 1918	11 January 1919	125 days	Party of Independence and '48 (F48P–Károlyi)
1		Count; Mihály Károlyi (1875–1955) also prime minister	11 January 1919	21 March 1919	125 days	Party of Independence and '48 (F48P–Károlyi)

== Hungarian Soviet Republic (1919) ==
Parties KMP

No.	Portrait	Name (Birth–Death)	Term of office			Party
No.	Portrait	Name (Birth–Death)	Took office	Left office	Tenure	Party
Chairman of the Central Executive Council of the Hungarian Soviet Republic
1		Sándor Garbai (1879–1947) also prime minister	21 March 1919	1 August 1919	133 days	Hungarian Communist Party (KMP)

== Hungarian People's Republic (1919) ==
Parties MSZDP

No.	Portrait	Name (Birth–Death)	Term of office			Party
No.	Portrait	Name (Birth–Death)	Took office	Left office	Tenure	Party
Provisional President of the Hungarian People's Republic
—		Gyula Peidl (1873–1943) acting, also prime minister	1 August 1919	6 August 1919	5 days	Social Democratic Party of Hungary (MSZDP)

== Hungarian Republic (1919–1920) ==
Parties KNP KNEP Independent

No.	Portrait	Name (Birth–Death)	Term of office			Party
No.	Portrait	Name (Birth–Death)	Took office	Left office	Tenure	Party
Regent of the Hungarian Republic
1		Archduke; Joseph August (1872–1962)	7 August 1919	23 August 1919	16 days	Independent
Provisional President of the Hungarian Republic
—		István Friedrich (1883–1951) acting, also prime minister	23 August 1919	24 November 1919	93 days	Christian National Party (KNP; Aug–Oct 1919) Christian National Union Party (KNEP; Oct–Nov 1919)
—		Károly Huszár (1882–1941) acting, also prime minister	24 November 1919	1 March 1920	98 days	Christian National Union Party (KNEP)

== Kingdom of Hungary (1920–1946) ==
Independent NYKP

No.	Portrait	Name (Birth–Death)	Term of office			Party
No.	Portrait	Name (Birth–Death)	Took office	Left office	Tenure	Party
Regent of the Kingdom of Hungary
1		Miklós Horthy (1868–1957)	1 March 1920	15 October 1944	24 years, 228 days	Independent
Vacant (15 October 1944 – 4 November 1944)
Leader of the Nation of Hungary
1		Ferenc Szálasi (1897–1946) also prime minister	4 November 1944	7 May 1945	184 days	Arrow Cross Party (NYKP)
Head of State of Hungary
—		General; Béla Miklós (1890–1948) in opposition, also prime minister	21 December 1944	25 January 1945	35 days	Independent
—		High National Council collective (Note: In opposition to 28 March 1945)	26 January 1945	1 February 1946	1 year, 6 days	Multi-party

== Hungarian Republic (1946–1949) ==
Parties FKGP MDP

No.	Portrait	Name (Birth–Death)	Term of office			Party
No.	Portrait	Name (Birth–Death)	Took office	Left office	Tenure	Party
President of the Hungarian Republic
1		Zoltán Tildy (1889–1961)	1 February 1946	3 August 1948	2 years, 184 days	Independent Smallholders, Agrarian Workers and Civic Party (FKGP)
2		Árpád Szakasits (1888–1965)	3 August 1948	23 August 1949	1 year, 20 days	Hungarian Working People's Party (MDP)

== Hungarian People's Republic (1949–1989) ==
Parties MDP–MSZMP Independent

No.	Portrait	Name (Birth–Death)	Term of office			Party
No.	Portrait	Name (Birth–Death)	Took office	Left office	Tenure	Party
Chairman of the Presidential Council of the Hungarian People's Republic
1		Árpád Szakasits (1888–1965)	23 August 1949	26 April 1950	246 days	Hungarian Working People's Party (MDP)
2		Sándor Rónai (1892–1965)	26 April 1950	14 August 1952	2 years, 110 days	Hungarian Working People's Party (MDP)
3		István Dobi (1898–1968)	14 August 1952	14 April 1967	14 years, 243 days	Independent (Aug 1952–1959)
3		István Dobi (1898–1968)	14 August 1952	14 April 1967	14 years, 243 days	Hungarian Socialist Workers' Party (MSZMP) (1959–Apr 1967)
4		Pál Losonczi (1919–2005)	14 April 1967	25 June 1987	20 years, 72 days	Hungarian Socialist Workers' Party (MSZMP)
5		Károly Németh (1922–2008)	25 June 1987	29 June 1988	1 year, 4 days	Hungarian Socialist Workers' Party (MSZMP)
6		Brunó Ferenc Straub (1914–1996)	29 June 1988	23 October 1989	1 year, 116 days	Independent

=== Leaders of the Hungarian Working People's Party / Hungarian Socialist Workers' Party ===
The leader of the Hungarian Working People's Party / Hungarian Socialist Workers' Party was the country's de facto chief executive; the officeholders are listed below.

Parties MDP–MSZMP

Portrait	Name (Birth–Death)	Term of office			Notes
Portrait	Name (Birth–Death)	Took office	Left office	Time in office	Notes
General Secretary of the Hungarian Working People's Party
	Mátyás Rákosi (1892–1971)	12 June 1948	28 June 1953	5 years, 16 days	Also Prime Minister (1952–1953)
First Secretary of the Hungarian Working People's Party
	Mátyás Rákosi (1892–1971)	28 June 1953	18 July 1956	3 years, 20 days	
	Ernő Gerő (1898–1980)	18 July 1956	25 October 1956	99 days	
	János Kádár (1912–1989)	25 October 1956	31 October 1956	6 days	
First Secretary of the Hungarian Socialist Workers' Party
	János Kádár (1912–1989)	31 October 1956	28 March 1985	28 years, 148 days	Also Prime Minister (1956–1958 and 1961–1965)
General Secretary of the Hungarian Socialist Workers' Party
	János Kádár (1912–1989)	28 March 1985	22 May 1988	3 years, 55 days	
	Károly Grósz (1930–1996)	22 May 1988	26 June 1989	1 year, 35 days	Also Prime Minister (1987–1988)
President of the Hungarian Socialist Workers' Party
	Rezső Nyers (1923–2018)	26 June 1989	7 October 1989	103 days	

== Hungary (from 1989) ==
Parties MSZP SZDSZ Fidesz TISZA Independent

No.	Portrait	Name (Birth–Death)	Term of office			Party	Term (Election)
No.	Portrait	Name (Birth–Death)	Took office	Left office	Tenure	Party	Term (Election)
President of the Hungarian Republic
—		Mátyás Szűrös (born 1933) provisional	23 October 1989	2 May 1990	191 days	Hungarian Socialist Party (MSZP)	—
—		Árpád Göncz (1922–2015)	2 May 1990	3 August 1990	10 years, 93 days	Alliance of Free Democrats (SZDSZ)	—
1		Árpád Göncz (1922–2015)	3 August 1990	3 August 2000	10 years, 93 days	Alliance of Free Democrats (SZDSZ)	1 (1990)
1		Árpád Göncz (1922–2015)	3 August 1990	3 August 2000	10 years, 93 days	Alliance of Free Democrats (SZDSZ)	2 (1995)
2		Ferenc Mádl (1931–2011)	4 August 2000	4 August 2005	5 years	Independent	3 (2000)
3		László Sólyom (1942–2023)	5 August 2005	5 August 2010	5 years	Independent	4 (2005)
4		Pál Schmitt (born 1942)	6 August 2010	31 December 2011	1 year, 147 days	Fidesz	5 (2010)
President of the Republic of Hungary (Note: Under the Fundamental Law, adopted in 2011, the official name of the state is simply Hungary as opposed to the former name "Hungarian Republic", but the form of government is still a republic and the office is referred to as the president of the republic, though in a sense of "the president of the republic that presides over Hungary", rather than "the president who presides over the Republic of Hungary".)
(4)		Pál Schmitt (born 1942)	1 January 2012	2 April 2012 (resigned)	92 days	Fidesz	5 (2010)
—		László Kövér (born 1959) acting	2 April 2012	10 May 2012	38 days	Fidesz	—
5		János Áder (born 1959)	10 May 2012	10 May 2022	10 years	Fidesz	6 (2012)
5		János Áder (born 1959)	10 May 2012	10 May 2022	10 years	Fidesz	7 (2017)
6		Katalin Novák (born 1977)	10 May 2022	26 February 2024 (resigned)	1 year, 292 days	Fidesz	8 (2022)
—		László Kövér (born 1959) acting	26 February 2024	5 March 2024	8 days	Fidesz	—
7		Tamás Sulyok (born 1956)	5 March 2024	19 July 2026 (removed from office) (Note: Sulyok's mandate was terminated by the 17th Amendment to the Fundamental Law of Hungary.)	2 years, 136 days	Independent	9 (2024)
—		Ágnes Forsthoffer (born 1980) acting	20 July 2026	19 August 2026	30 days	Tisza Party (TISZA)	—
8		András Baka (born 1952)	19 August 2026	Incumbent	79 days	Independent	10 (2026)

== Timeline ==
This is a graphical lifespan timeline of the heads of state of Hungary. They are listed in order of first assuming office.

The following chart lists heads of state by lifespan (living heads of state on the green line), with the years outside of their tenure in beige. Heads of state with an unknown birth date or death date are shown with only their tenure or their earlier or later life.

The following chart shows heads of state by their age (living heads of state in green), with the years of their tenure in blue. Heads of state with an unknown birth or death date are excluded. The vertical black line at 35 years indicates the minimum age to be president.

== See also ==
- List of Hungarian monarchs
- List of prime ministers of Hungary
