= 2026 Hungarian presidential election =

- 11 August 2026

Needed to win: Two-thirds of all members of the National Assembly (first ballot) 198 MPs, 133 votes needed to win
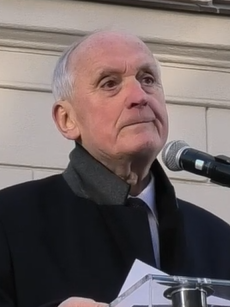

Nominee	András Baka	Against
Party	Independent
Alliance	TISZA
Electoral vote	140	6
Percentage	95.89%	4.11%
President before election
Ágnes Forsthoffer
(acting)
TISZA
Elected President
András Baka
Independent

An early indirect presidential election was held in Hungary on 11 August 2026 following Tamás Sulyok's removal by constitutional amendment. András Baka, a former president of the Supreme Court of Hungary, was nominated by the governing Tisza Party and was elected with a two-thirds majority. This was the first election in which the winning candidate was not backed by Fidesz since 1995, as well as the first in which Fidesz–KDNP did not nominate a candidate.

== Background ==
=== Sulyok's removal ===
Tamás Sulyok's 2024 election came on the heels of his predecessor Katalin Novák's resignation in the wake of her pardon scandal (kegyelmi botrány). The scandal precipitated enormous public outcry against Novák's Fidesz, which had governed Hungary for fourteen years under Viktor Orbán. Although, as a professional jurist, he was nominally a political independent, Sulyok's presidential candidacy received only Fidesz and Christian Democratic People's Party's support in the National Assembly; as such, he was widely perceived as a Fidesz partisan and ally of Orbán's. Thus, in the run-up to the 2026 parliamentary election, which centered around Orbán's long-standing premiership, Péter Magyar pledged that, if his Tisza Party won a two-thirds supermajority in the National Assembly, they would modify the Fundamental Law to remove Sulyok from office. In Hungarian constitutional law, such a supermajority is the threshold for amending the Fundamental Law.

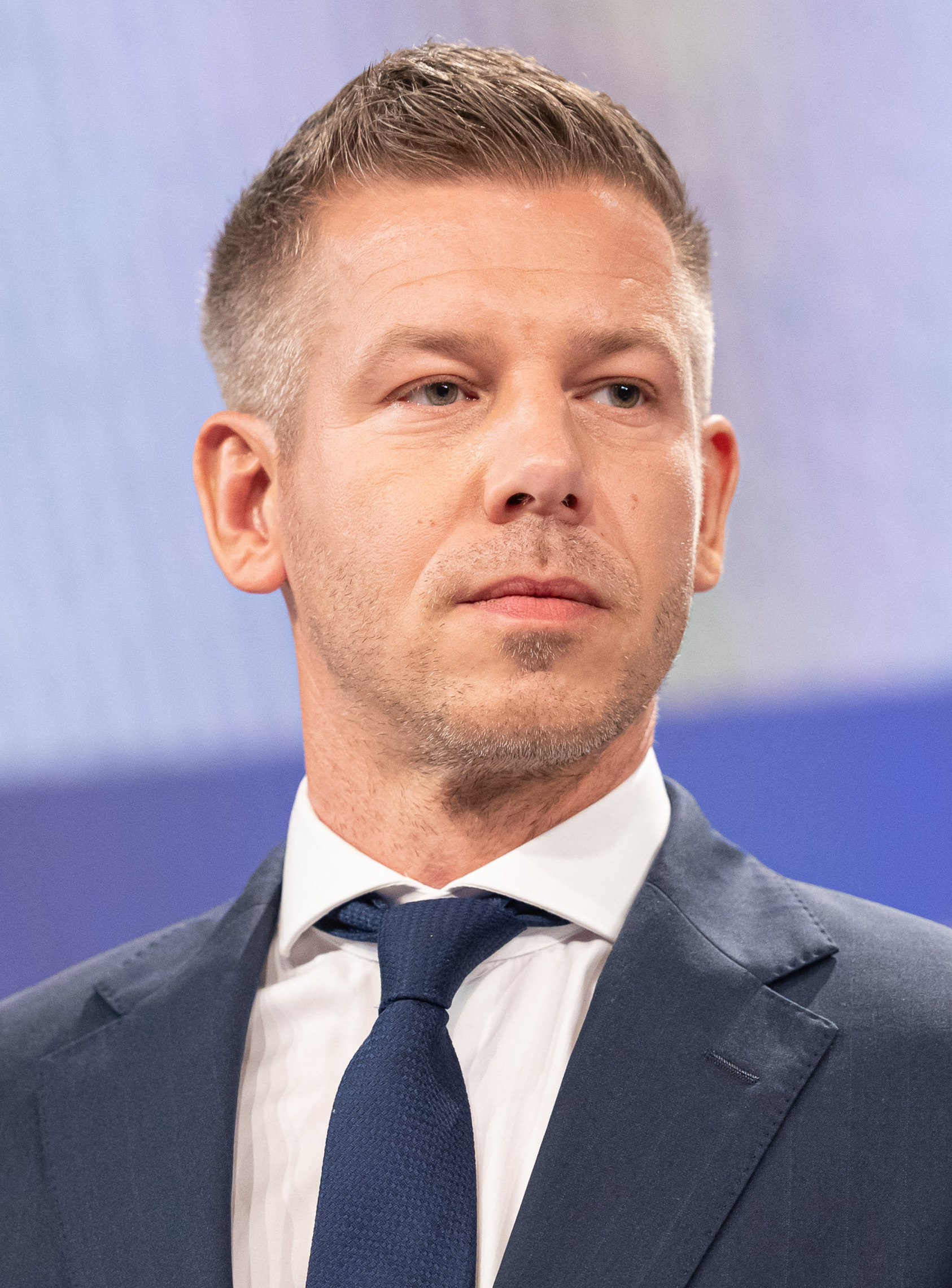
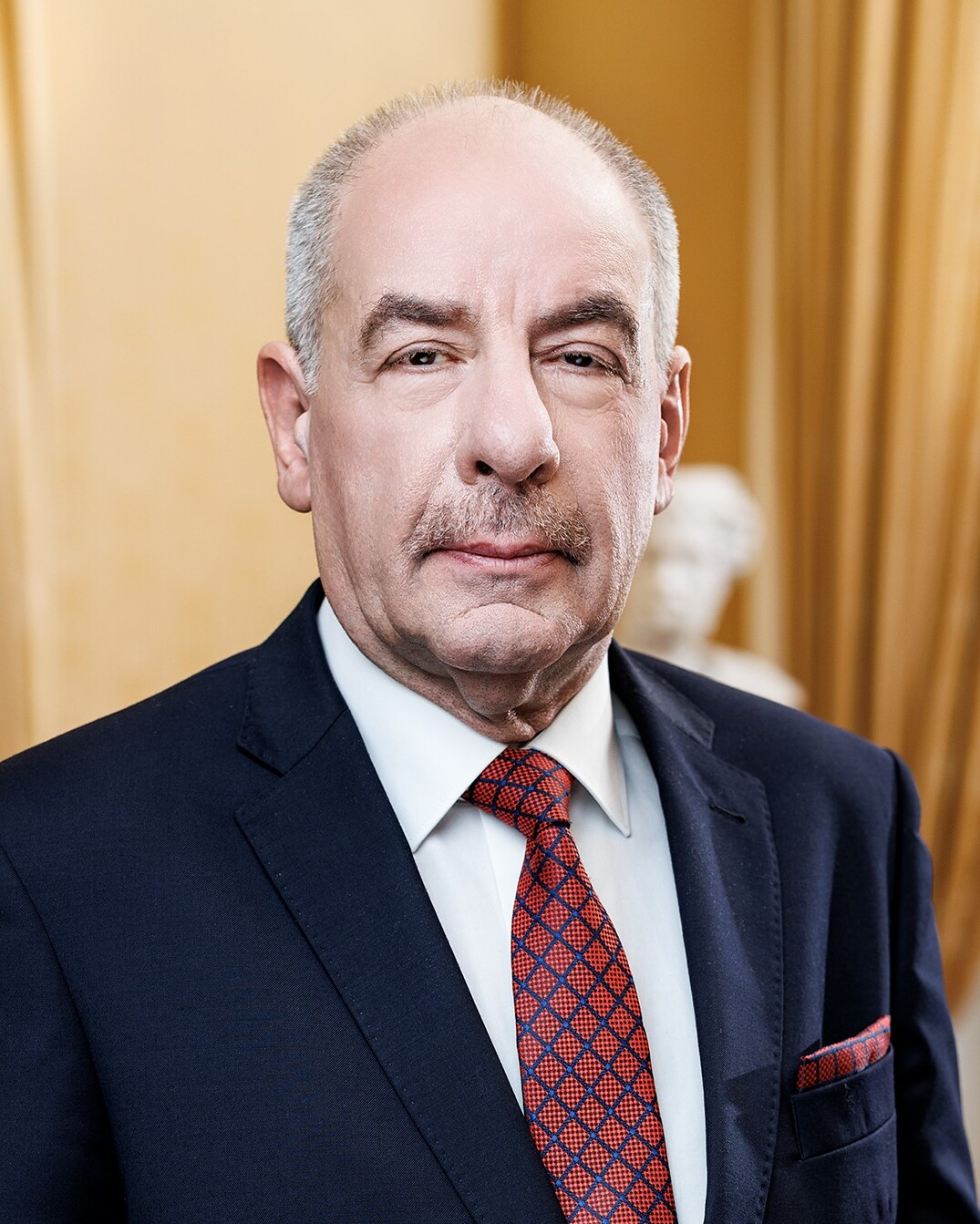
Péter Magyar (left) urged Tamás Sulyok (right) and other Orbán era top officials to resign.

After Tisza won a two-thirds supermajority, Magyar met with Sulyok on 15 April 2026 and urged him to resign voluntarily, calling him "unworthy of representing the unity of the Hungarian nation." Magyar also called for other prominent Orbán era officials to step down and set a deadline of 31 May for their resignation. After the deadline passed without Sulyok taking action, Magyar stated he would urge Tisza lawmakers to remove Sulyok legislatively. Magyar subsequently outlined his proposal to amend the Fundamental Law to remove Sulyok from office and to subsequently elect a new president until a new constitution is affirmed by a referendum.

On 13 July, Magyar's proposed reforms were approved by the National Assembly; the amendment ousting Sulyok from the presidency passed by a margin of 139–6. Sulyok had five days to sign the proposal into law or refer it to the Constitutional Court for review. Magyar stated that if Sulyok did not sign the amendment, the National Assembly would initiate impeachment proceedings against him. Sulyok ultimately signed the amendment, removing himself from office on 20 July. Ágnes Forsthoffer, the Speaker of the National Assembly, subsequently became acting President under the Fundamental Law.

=== Early self-nominations, propositions and declinations ===
On 16 April, after the general election but while Sulyok was still in office, Gábor Iványi (Note: During the Orbán era, Iványi was repeatedly floated as a potential presidential candidate by the then-opposition centre-left and liberal parties, but never actually secured a nomination.) stated that he would accept the presidential office if he received a serious offer to do so. However, on 25 April, in an apparent change of heart, Iványi said that "serving as president is not something [he] needs in [his] life story."

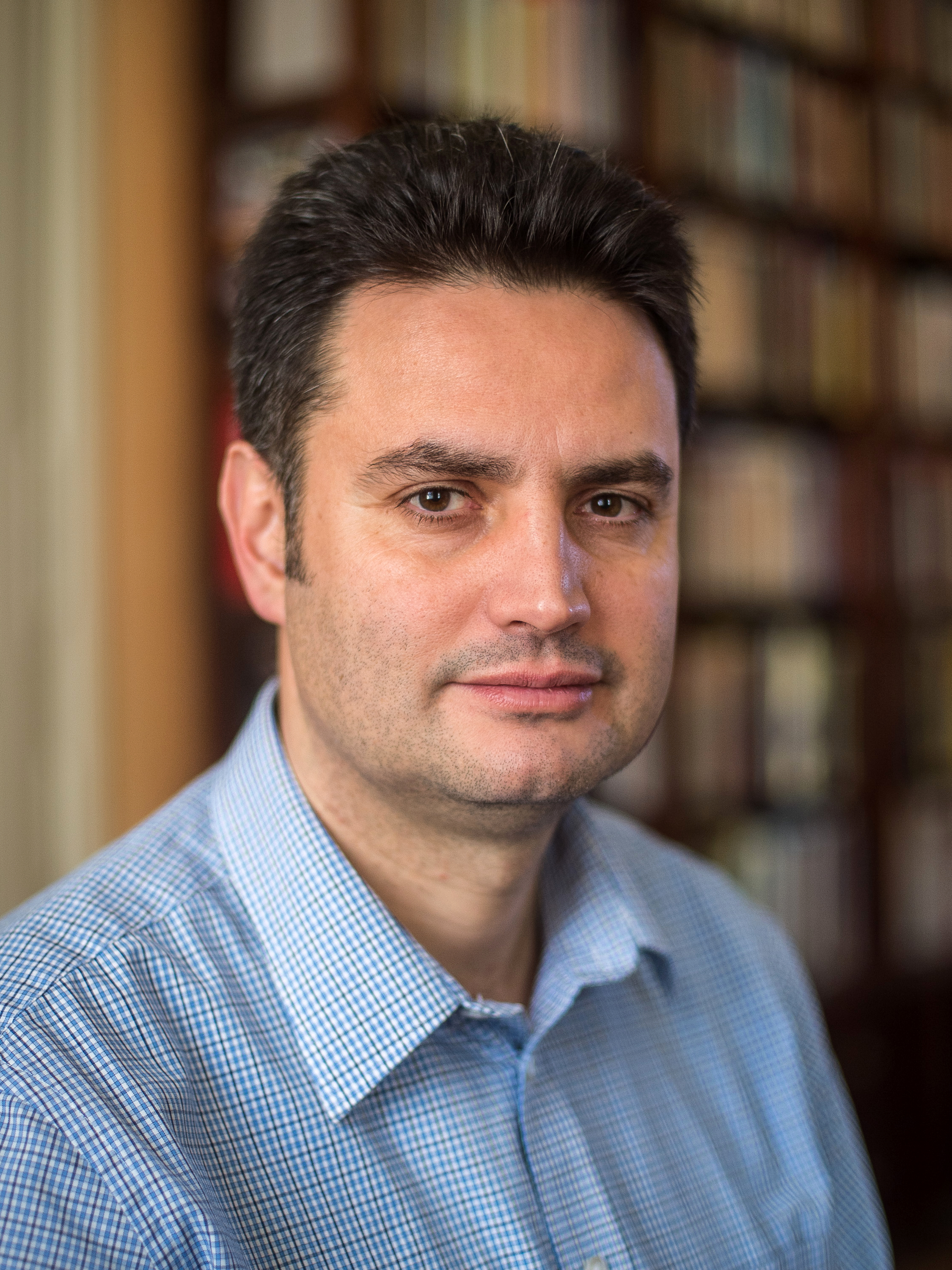
Péter Márki-Zay expressed interest in running for president shortly after the 2026 parliamentary election.

On 22 April, Péter Márki-Zay stated that if there were to be a direct presidential election in the future, he would gladly run and "represent the people." On 9 June, Márki-Zay reaffirmed his former statement in the context of a circulating internal poll assessing the public's view of his potential presidency. András Schiffer, on the other hand, whose name appeared alongside Márki-Zay's in this poll, said the chances of him running were "about the same as [his] becom[ing] Pope."

On 20 April, László Majtényi was asked in an interview whether he wanted to run, as he had in 2017. He dismissed the possibility.

On 24 April, Endre Hann was also asked in an interview whether he would accept the presidency given his recent rise in public appeal. (Note: Hann's Medián Public Opinion and Market Research Institute had most accurately predicted the outcome of the 2026 parliamentary election.) Hann stated that while he considered the prospect unrealistic, he would not turn down such an offer.

On 20 May, Péter Róna stated that, like Majtényi, after his presidential candidacy in 2022, he did not wish to run again.

On 3 June, Gábor Vona proposed five known public figures (József Ángyán, Lajos Kassai, András Lányi, József Pálinkás (Note: In the 2010s, Pálinkás was repeatedly floated as a potential presidential candidate by the then-ruling Fidesz–KDNP, but never actually secured a nomination.) and Péter Tölgyessy) who, in his view, could ably serve as president. Later, Vona also recommended that a direct presidential election be held on 23 October, the 70th anniversary of the Hungarian Revolution of 1956.

On 6 July, Márton Melléthei-Barna announced that Tisza would nominate a candidate "independent of political squabbles." This effectively ruled out the possibility of prominent leading politicians, such as Andrea Rost or Forsthoffer—who had previously been mentioned as possible contenders—running for the office.

=== Floating of Polgár and controversy ===
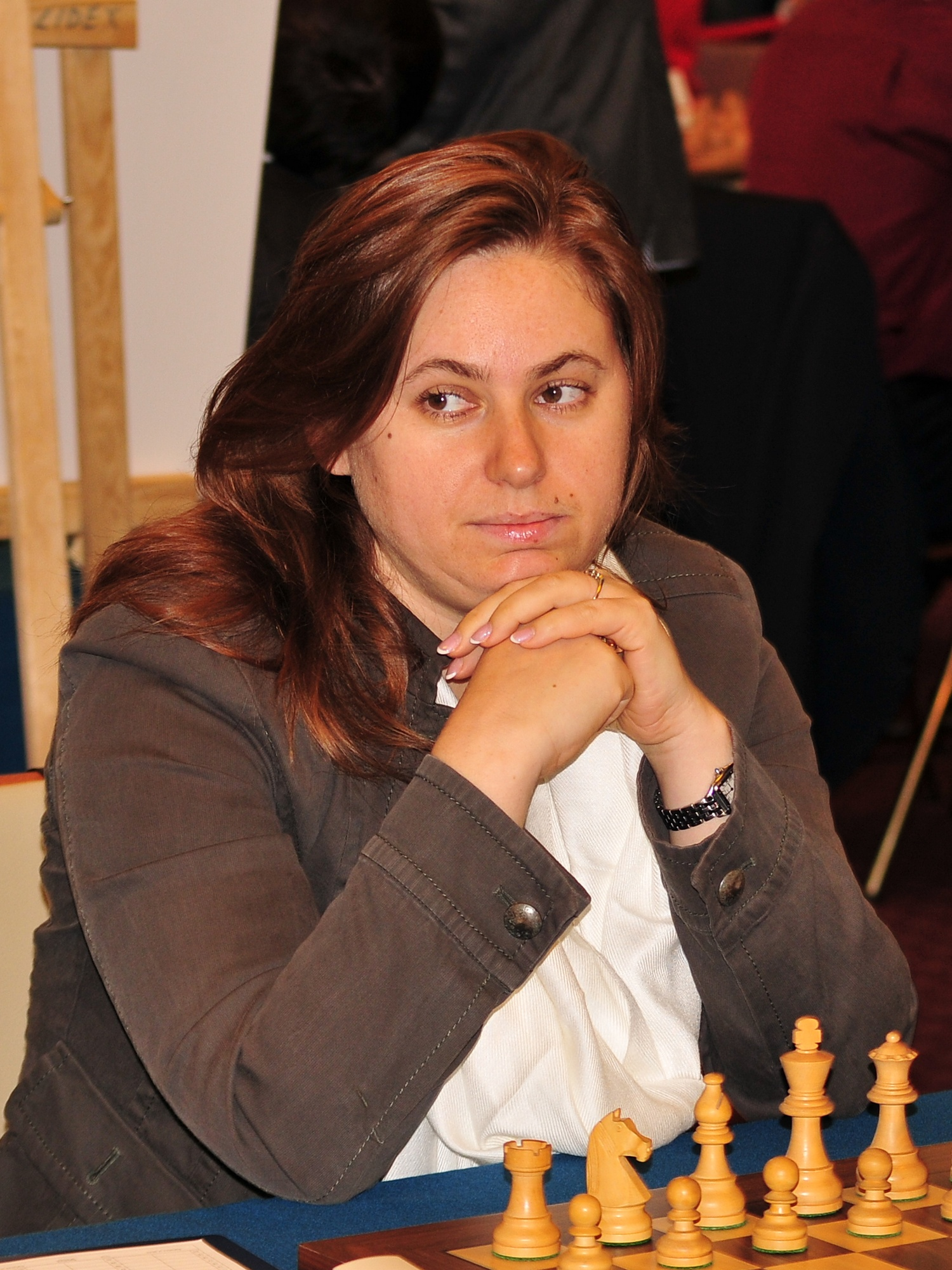
Sixteen prominent Hungarian public figures, the Tisza Party's parliamentary faction and Péter Magyar expressed support for Judit Polgár's candidacy, but she declined.

On 18 July, after Sulyok had triggered his own removal, Magyar pledged in a social media post that his Tisza Party would only nominate its presidential candidate after consulting with the public, civil society, and the parliamentary opposition—unlike, he claimed, the previous Fidesz government's modus operandi. On 19 July, sixteen prominent Hungarian scientists, artists, and sportsmen (Note: György Antall, László Baán, Albert-László Barabási, Tibor Kapu, Barnabás Kelemen, András Kepes, Katalin Kokas, János Kulka, László Lovász, Pál Mácsai, Tímea Nagy, Lajos Parti Nagy, István Peták, Ernő Rubik, Krisztina Tóth and Pál Závada) signed an open letter urging Tisza to nominate Judit Polgár for the role. Commentators noted that, a few weeks earlier, Magyar had played a chess match against Polgár at the U.S. Embassy in Budapest at a celebration of the 250th anniversary of the United States' independence. Magyar said he would meet with Polgár to assess her willingness to be nominated and on 20 July, Tisza's parliamentary faction also expressed its support for her candidacy.

The rapidity of this sequence of events was criticized by public and civil society groups like Amnesty International; commentators noted that Magyar was seemingly undermining the more deliberate consensus-seeking process he had previously promised to follow. On the evening of 20 July, Polgár announced on social media that she would not stand as a candidate, stating she did "not feel strong enough to take on the historic responsibility of uniting a divided nation." Magyar reacted by thanking Polgár for her consideration and continued, apparently in response to critics, that he had not in fact envisioned conducting a "societal consultation" on who the next president would be. "That decision ultimately rests with the Tisza Party faction and the National Assembly", he said, adding that "that's called representative democracy." The following day Andrea Bujdosó said that the party would conduct a "societal consultation" and that the consideration of specific individuals for the presidency was therefore on hold.

=== Further developments ===
Throughout July 2026, various civic organizations, public intellectuals, and newspapers proposed individuals they viewed as qualified candidates for the presidency. On 19 July, the Lawyer's Circle (Ügyvédkör) proposed Péter Bárándy; (Note: In 2005, Bárándy was floated as a potential presidential candidate by the then-ruling Hungarian Socialist Party and Alliance of Free Democrats coalition, but did not finally secured a nomination.) on 21 July, Zoltán Fleck, Róbert Puzsér, and Lányi suggested Adrienn Laczó; on the same day, Szemlélek proposed Tamás Fabiny; on 29 July, Magyar Hang published an op-ed similarly in support of Fabiny. Of these proposed nominees, only Laczó ultimately said she would be willing to consider serving as president.

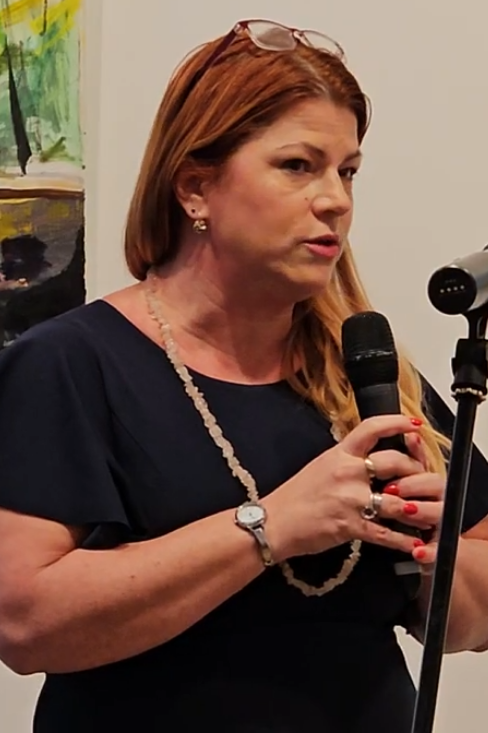
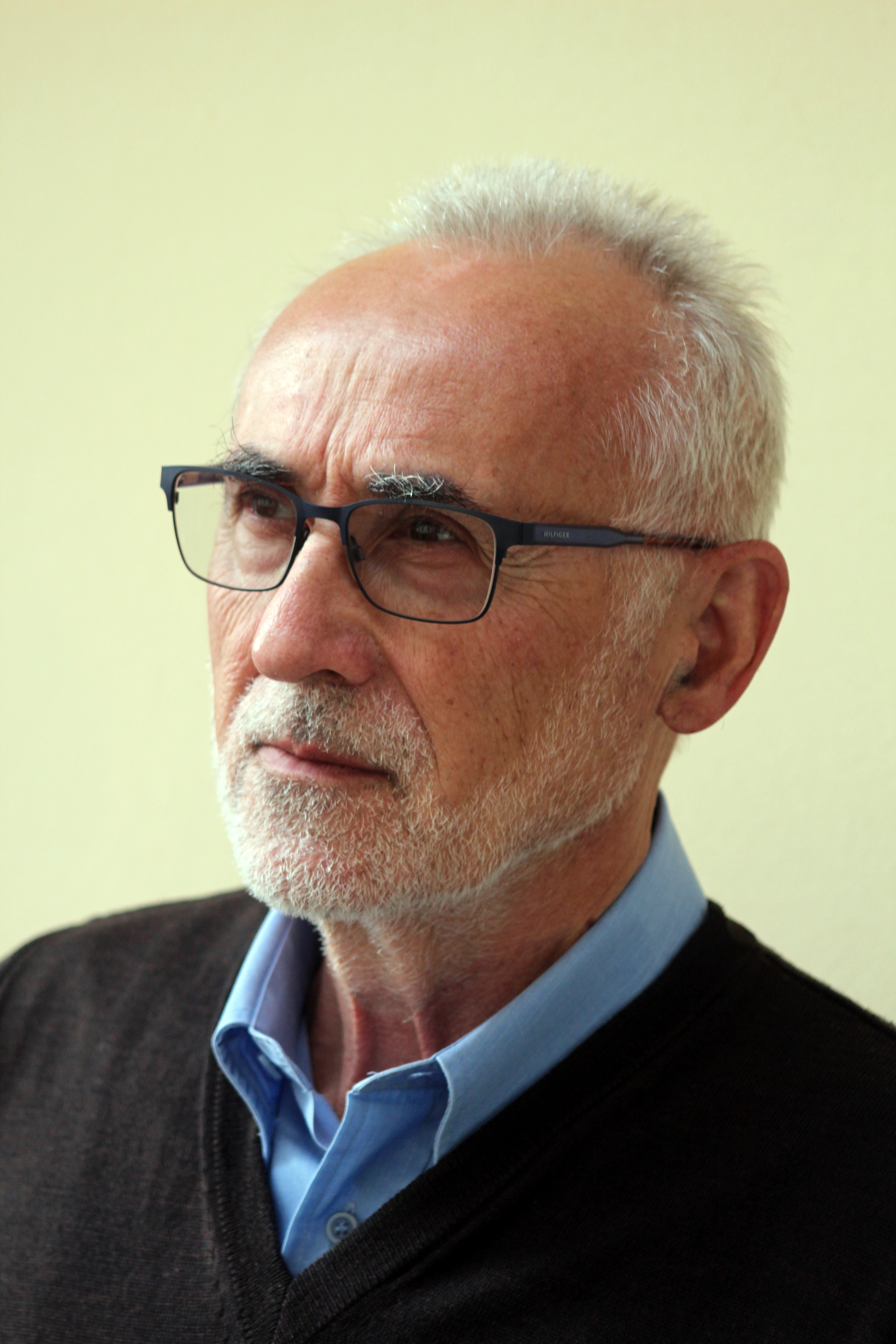
Adrienn Laczó (left) and Ignác Romsics (right) also expressed support from a few intellectuals.

On 21 and 23 July, Magyar and Bálint Ruff personally met with Botond Fülöp and Ignác Romsics, the latter having been proposed by Krisztián Ungváry and Péter Geszti as well. This fueled speculation that the Tisza Party was considering them for the presidency. Romsics, in an earlier interview, had stated that he did not consider himself suitable for the position. Fülöp had expressed a similar view about himself, noting that, given that "there are many candidates far more suitable," he "would have qualms" about accepting the office.

On 22 July, Géza Jeszenszky, while taking part in the Bálványos Free Summer University and Student Camp, answered in response to a question about his potential candidacy that, even if it were offered to him, he would be unable to accept the presidential office because he "is already too old for it" and had "other plans" for the future.

On 23 July, Magyar held a press conference at which he reiterated that Tisza would not conduct a "societal consultation" on the selection of the president and that the party was not considering any candidates who had been involved in Hungarian politics "in the preceding decades." Commentators noted that this likely meant that Tisza was unwilling to support the candidacy of Ákos Hadházy, Bárándy, Iványi or Márki-Zay.

On 5 August, Magyar and Ruff met with András Baka, who had been removed from the helm of the then-Supreme Court—which later continued to operate as the Curia (Kúria)—in 2011 by the second Orbán government. Due to the similarity of the meetings and photographs taken with Fülöp and Romsics two weeks earlier, the media speculated that Baka was a presidential candidate. Not long after, László Kéri, Gábor Török and Róna opined that Baka would be an excellent nominee. Török highlighted the continued relevance of the constitutional circumstances around Baka's 2011 dismissal.

=== Parliamentary party nominations ===
On 20 July, János Bóka announced that Fidesz and the Christian Democratic People's Party, despite having enough MPs to advance a nomination, would not take part in the election, as they continue to view the removal of Sulyok and other Orbán-appointed officials as unconstitutional.

On 30 July, the Our Homeland Movement announced that the party would nominate Máté Tóth (Note: Tóth was a founding member of the Fidesz-closed Utility Cost Protection Digital Civic Circle (Rezsivédelmi Digitális Polgári Kör) during the 2026 parliamentary election's campaign period.) for the presidency. However, László Toroczkai added that this nomination was "merely symbolic," both because the party lacks sufficient representation in the National Assembly to nominate candidate and because, according to Toroczkai, "the current situation calls for a president who is not only familiar with Hungarian public law, but also has a precise understanding of today's constitutional and political situations; furthermore, a professional well-versed in both theory and practice, and capable of truly safeguarding constitutional order." According to the party, though Tóth is not affiliated with a political party, he "consistently thinks from a national perspective and because of that is suitable for the position."

On 7 August, during a press conference, Magyar reaffirmed his party's preference for a nonpartisan head of state. This suggested that the nomination of Forsthoffer and other parliamentary politicians was unlikely. Magyar then added that Tisza's parliamentary faction would make a decision between three candidates—Baka, Fülöp and Romsics—the following day and revealed that Tisza had held private discussions with other prospective candidates as well. Magyar explained that, in his view, any of Tisza's proposed nominess would "surely be a far better president than those ones who filled the position in the past sixteen years," a reference to Pál Schmitt, János Áder, Novák, and Sulyok.

On 8 August, Magyar announced that, after an internal discussion and vote, Tisza's parliamentarians had nominated Baka for the position. As such, Baka was be the only candidate in the 11 August election; once duly elected, he will take office eight days later.

On 10 August, the National Assembly met to hear parliamentarians' nominations. Baka gathered 140, while Tóth secured 6. Consequently, Baka officially became the only qualified candidate to stand in the presidential election.

2026 Hungarian presidential primary
- 10 August 2026

One-fifth of all members of the National Assembly needed to nominate a presidential candidate 199 MPs, 40 MPs needed for nomination
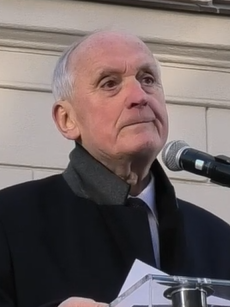

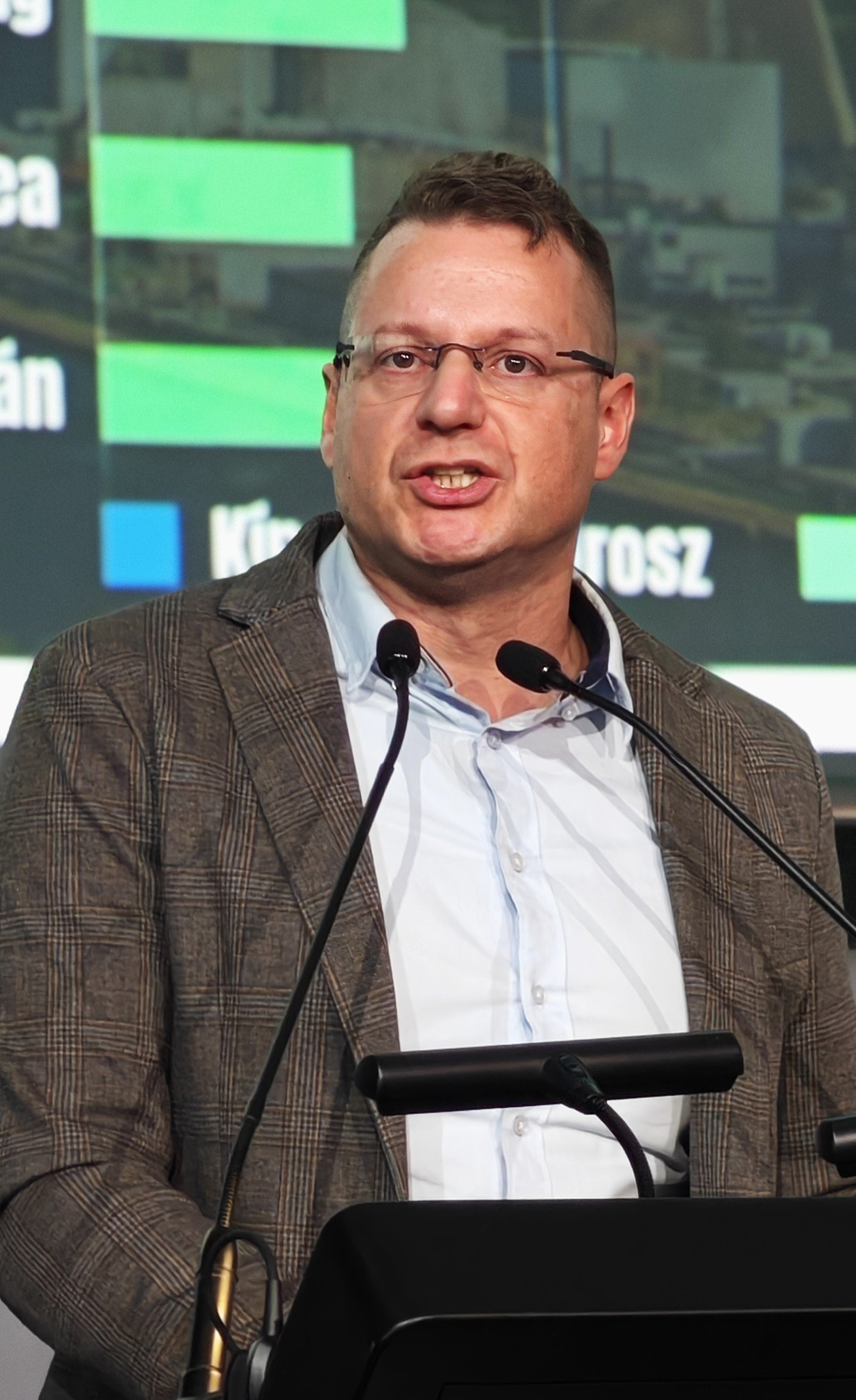
Nominee	András Baka	Maté Tóth
Party	Independent	Independent
Electoral vote	140	6
Percentage	70.35%	3.02%
Nominated by	TISZA	MH

=== Reactions to Baka's nomination ===
Baka's nomination drew criticism from the right-wing parliamentary opposition parties. Fidesz and the Christian Democratic People's Party accused Baka of personally facilitating the establishment of Tisza's "authoritarian rule" by accepting the position and claimed that, like Magyar, he was driven by a desire for revenge. Our Homeland Movement, on the other hand, recalled a 2001 case in which Baka—then a judge of the European Court of Human Rights—participated in proceedings concerning the Hungarian-born János Korbély. Baka had joined the Court's 11–6 majority in ruling that Korbély's actions during the Hungarian Revolution of 1956—in which Korbély, then a police captain in his late twenties, had ordered that shots be fired on a group of revolutionaries in Tata, resulting in three deaths—did not constitute a crime against humanity.

Left-wing opposition parties and politicians generally supported Baka's nomination. Budapest mayor Gergely Karácsony, for example, commented that "the NER (Nemzeti Együttműködés Rendszere) [i.e., the Orbán system] began with the firing of Baka, and now it ends with his election as President of the Republic."

On August 10, Fülöp (contradicting his original position) said that, if he had received an invitation to serve as president, he "would have considered serving his country in such an important role a tremendous honor and a significant opportunity that simply could not have been refused." However, he claimed Baka had been his preferred candidate from the very beginning, as "no one else was currently better suited for the position."

== Electoral system ==
The Fundamental Law stipulates that the President is elected by the National Assembly via a secret ballot no sooner than sixty days, but no later thirty days before the expiry of the current president's five-year mandate. If the previous president's mandate was terminated prematurely, the presidential election must be held within thirty days of said termination. The Fundamental Law delegates the responsibility of setting the date of the election to the Speaker of the National Assembly.

To be considered, a presidential candidate must be nominated in writing by at least one-fifth of the Members of Parliament (40 MPs); one MP may not nominate more than one presidential candidate. In the first round of the election, a two-thirds majority of all MPs elects the president. If no candidate receives such a majority during the first round, further rounds are held between the candidates who received the most and second-most votes in the first round (although in practice, since 1990, there have never been more than two candidates in any presidential election). In these subsequent rounds, a simple majority of voting MPs elects the president. If only one candidate has been nominated (which has occurred four times: in 1990, 2000, 2012, and 2024), the Assembly votes on whether to accept or reject this candidate's election; MPs may vote for or against, but may not vote for an alternative candidate.

== Candidates ==
=== Declared ===
- András Baka, former Member of the National Assembly, former judge of the European Court of Human Rights and former President of the Supreme Court; nominated by the Tisza Party

=== Ineligible to run ===
- Máté Tóth, lawyer, economist and writer; "symbolically" nominated by Our Homeland Movement

=== Expressed interest ===
- Endre Hann, social psychologist and pollster
- Adrienn Laczó, former judge
- Péter Márki-Zay, Mayor of Hódmezővásárhely and prime ministerial candidate in 2022

=== Potential ===
- József Ángyán, agriculture engineer, professor and former State Secretary in the Ministry of Rural Development
- Péter Bárándy, jurist and former Minister of Justice
- Botond Fülöp, lawyer and blogger who became known as "the Provincial Lawyer" (Vidéki prókátor) for uncovering the presidential pardon of Endre Kónya
- Ágnes Forsthoffer, Speaker of the National Assembly and acting President of Hungary
- Ákos Hadházy, veterinarian, anti-corruption activist and former Member of the National Assembly
- Lajos Kassai, bowyer, archer and equestrian
- András Lányi, writer, philosopher and environmental activist
- József Pálinkás, atomic physicist, former Minister of Education and former President of the Hungarian Academy of Sciences
- Ignác Romsics, historian, professor, and academician
- Andrea Rost, Commissioner for Hungarian Music Culture
- Péter Tölgyessy, political scientist and former Member of the National Assembly

=== Declined ===
- Tamás Fabiny, retired Lutheran bishop and former head of the Evangelical-Lutheran Church in Hungary
- Gábor Iványi, Methodist pastor, humanitarian and former Member of the National Assembly
- Géza Jeszenszky, former Minister of Foreign Affairs and former ambassador to the United States, Norway, and Iceland
- László Majtényi, jurist, professor and presidential candidate in 2017
- Judit Polgár, chess grandmaster
- Péter Róna, economist, lawyer and presidential candidate in 2022
- András Schiffer, lawyer and former Member of the National Assembly

== Opinion polls ==
These public polls show the popularity of those figures, who have been linked to presidency in the media or could be potential candidates from the parliamentary parties. As such the President of Hungary is elected indirectly under the current Fundamental Law rules, poll results primarily show whom respondents would like to see in the position.

Polling firm	Fieldwork date	Sample size	Bárándy Ind.	Forsthoffer TISZA	V. Orbán Fidesz	Polgár (Note: Polgár declined the nomination on 20 July 2026.) Ind.	Pálinkás Ind.	Márki-Zay MMN	A. Orbán TISZA	Rost TISZA	Hadházy Ind.	Magyar TISZA	Fülöp Ind.	Iványi (Note: Iványi declined the nomination on 25 April 2026.) Ind.	Laczó Ind.	Sulyok (Note: Sulyok's presidency ended on 20 July 2026.) Ind.	Morvai Ind.	Romsics Ind.	Others	Don't know/No answer
Medián	22–24 July 2026	1,000	8	2	1	2	–	5	–	–	6	–	2	2	2	2	1	1	–	60
Publicus	16–21 July 2026	1,002	20.9	7.2	5.8	4.8	2.8	2.0	1.4	1.2	0.8	0.6	–	–	–	–	–	–	3.2	49.8

=== Suitability as president ===
The following tables outline the perceived suitability of individuals to be President of Hungary.

==== András Baka ====
Fieldwork date	Polling firm	Sample size	Baka (Note: Baka was elected as President of Hungary on 11 August 2026.) Ind.			
Fieldwork date	Polling firm	Sample size	check	X mark	Question	Net
11–12 Aug 2026	21 Kutatóközpont	1,000	41	16	43	+25

==== Judit Polgár ====
Fieldwork date	Polling firm	Sample size	Polgár Ind.			
Fieldwork date	Polling firm	Sample size	check	X mark	Question	Net
22–24 Jul 2026	Medián	1,000	33	42	25	-9
20 Jul 2026	Europion	1,800	26	35	39	-9

==== Tamás Sulyok ====
Fieldwork date	Polling firm	Sample size	Sulyok Ind.			
Fieldwork date	Polling firm	Sample size	check	X mark	Question	Net
16–21 Jul 2026	Publicus	1,002	25	64	–	-39
5–10 Apr 2026	AtlasIntel	1,587	34.1	54.7	11.2	-20.6

==== "Who do you consider the most suitable person to be the President of Hungary?" ====
Fieldwork date	Polling firm	Sample size	Baka Ind.	Sulyok Ind.	Others (Note: Including Péter Bárándy, Ágnes Forsthoffer, Ákos Hadházy, Péter Márki-Zay, Katalin Novák, Viktor Orbán, Judit Polgár, Ignác Romsics, András Schiffer, Máté Tóth and Judit Varga)	Don't know/No answer			
Fieldwork date	Polling firm	Sample size	11–12 Aug 2026	21 Kutatóközpont	1,000	14	5	20	62

=== aHang's poll ===
On 19 July, a day after Magyar asked the citizens and political parties to propose a new President, aHang launched an online public poll on the subject, which results were published on 5 August. It was filled by more than 60,000 participants, evaluating a total 641 noted individuals—some of whom were nominated by the voters themselves—via an Openion called system by rating each ones' suitability on a scale, ranging from −3 to +3 values. The poll revealed that Bárándy, Hadházy and Laczó are by far the three most popular candidates among voters, though Fülöp, Forsthoffer and Romsics also received more than 10,000 positive votes. Baka, who ultimately became Tisza's candidate, achieved a much weaker result—as negative votes outnumbered positive ones in his case—and failed to make it into the top ten, as Baka had previously been little known to the general public, and because of that he was not featured in opinion polls and had a slimmer perceived likelihood of securing the presidency.

== Results ==
Although MPs from Our Homeland Movement, after the unsuccessful nomination of Tóth, voted in the election, they, as with Fidesz–KDNP's MPs, neither attended the announcement of the results, nor Baka’s ceremonial swearing-in and speech in the National Assembly.

Candidate	Nominated by	Votes	%
András Baka	TISZA	140	95.89
Against		6	4.11
Total minimum		133	
Voters		146	100
Absentees		53	26.63
Total/turnout		199	73.37

== Aftermath ==
On August 17, the Constitutional Court rejected a complaint, submitted by Fidesz, that the Seventeenth Amendment to the Fundamental Law had been unconstitutional. The legality of the Tisza Party's mechanism for removing Sulyok was thereby upheld.

Baka assumed office on 19 August, becoming the 8th President of the Republic since the fall of communism in Hungary.
