= Magyar Közlöny =

Government gazette of Hungary

- Type: periodical
- Format: electronic
- Owner(s): Government of Hungary
- Publisher: Ministry of Justice
- President: László Péter Salgó
- Language: Hungarian
- Headquarters: 4 Kossuth Lajos Square District V Budapest.
- City: Budapest
- Country: Hungary

Magyar Közlöny (“Hungarian Gazette”) is a periodical, official journal of Hungary. Before 2010 Hungarian parliamentary election it was edited by the Cabinet of Prime Minister, after it belonged to the Editorial Board at the Ministry of Administration and Justice. It publishes measures and other documents.

Electronic version of Magyar Közlöny is regarded as trustworthy, with time stamp and with the electronic signature of the editor. Printed version is just for the aim to inform people about the changes.

== Content ==
- Measures are published in Magyar Közlöny. These include Constitution of Hungary and its modifications, laws accepted by National Assembly, orders issued by the Government, head of the National Bank, Prime Minister and Ministers. Resolutions for the uniformity of law issued by Kúria and decisions made by Constitutional Court have to be taken into consideration during the usage of law. National Election Committee also uses this newspaper for publishing its stances and decisions made regarding electoral requests. Several decisions are also published here, most notably the decisions of Minister of Foreign Affairs and Trade about the international law. Other segments include appointments made by the Prime Minister or the President. Though resolutions of municipal governments ae also regarded as measurements, those are not published here.
- Magyar Közlöny contains only new measurements, old measurements in consolidated structure with old amendments are not published here. The sole exception is the Constitution, which may be ordered to be published in a consolidated way. It happened e.g. after the fourth amendment.
- Law or the Prime Minister may order the publishing of announcements as well.
- Orders, decisions and announcements issued by ministers or announcements from other bodies are published in Hivatalos Értesítő, which is published weekly 2 or 3 times as the Appendix of Magyar Közlöny.

== History ==
Magyar Közlöny was first published on 4 January 1945 as a successor of earlier official newspaper, called Budapesti Közlöny. First 15 volumes were printed in Debrecen. Since that every issue is published in Budapest.

On the cover page the Coat of arm has been changed as well.

date	Coat of arms
4 January 1945 – 4 June 1946	
5 June 1946 – 30 November 1946	No coat of arms displayed
1 December 1946 – 18 August 1949	
20 August 1949 – 20 October 1956	
12 November 1956 – 11 May 1957	
15 May 1957 – 1 July 1990	
Since 11 July 1990	

At the beginning it contained only measurements, but since 28 March 1945 it contained proclamations as well. (Currently these are included in Hivatalos Értesítő).
