= Katalin Novák presidential pardon scandal =

2024 political scandal in Hungary

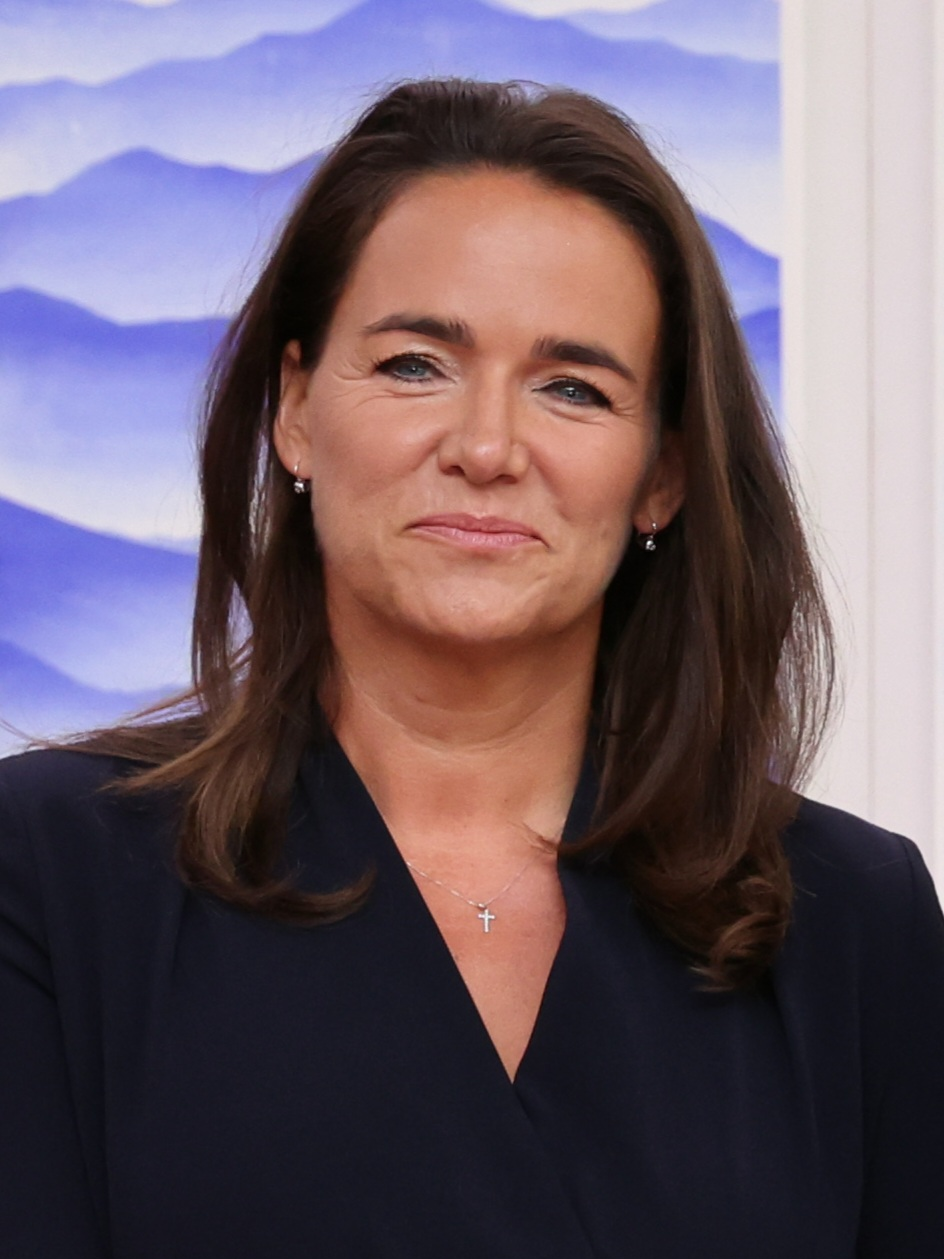
Novák in 2024

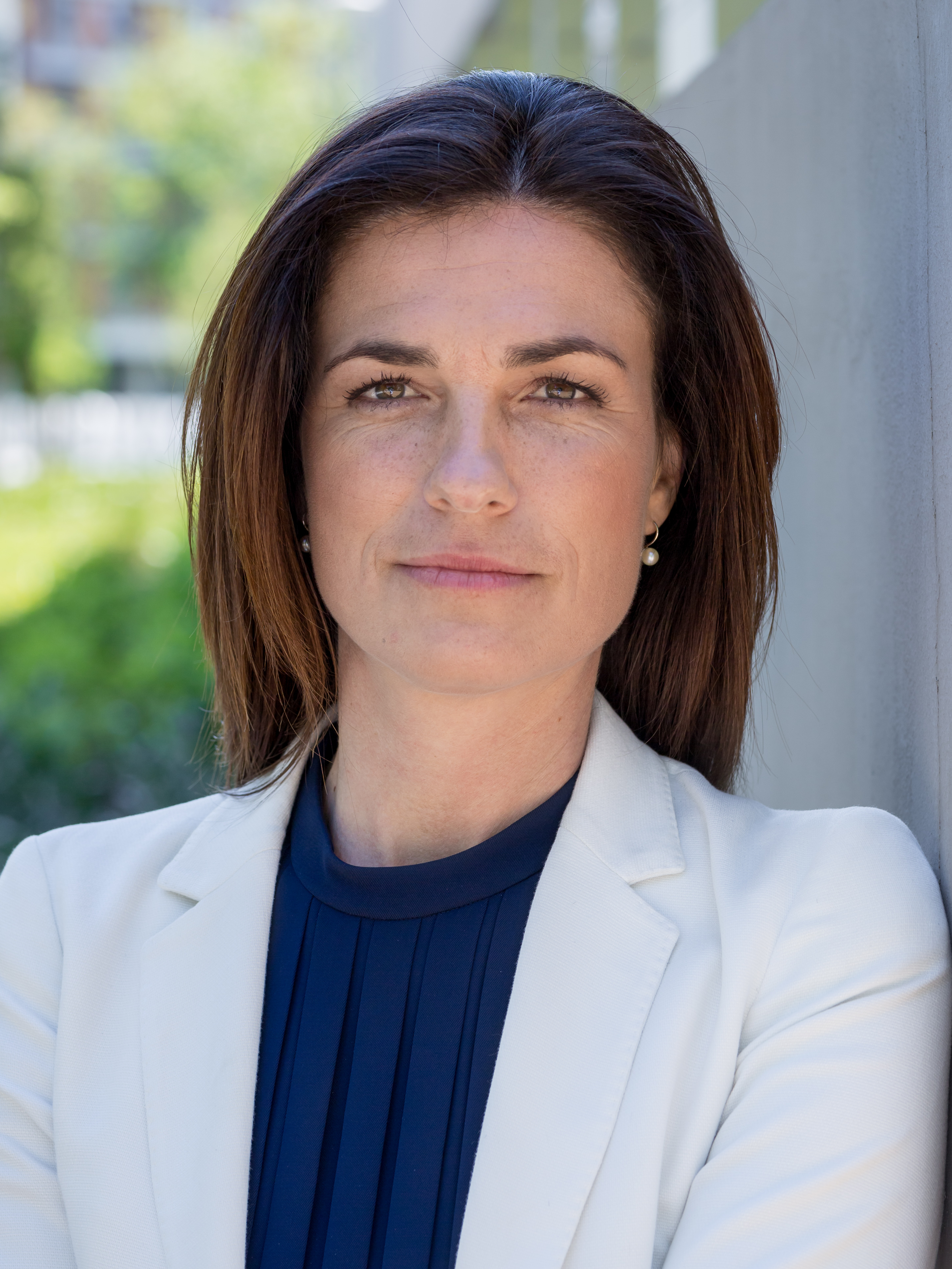
Varga in 2020

A political scandal arose in Hungary on 2 February 2024 when it became public that, in 2023, president Katalin Novák had pardoned Endre Kónya, a social worker who had served as the deputy director of the Kossuth Zsuzsa Children's Home in Bicske. In 2021, Kónya had been convicted of covering up child sexual abuse committed by his supervisor over a twelve-year period. The discovery of the pardon caused major public outcry, led Novák to resign the presidency of Hungary eight days later, and caused Judit Varga—who, as the then-Minister of Justice, had countersigned Kónya's pardon—to withdraw from public life. Following Novák's resignation, the National Assembly elected Tamás Sulyok as her successor on 26 February.

The scandal, usually just called the Pardon Affair (Hungarian: kegyelmi ügy) or Pardon Scandal (Hungarian: kegyelmi botrány) in Hungarian public discourse, severely eroded the popularity of the four-term Fidesz government and led to the emergence of Péter Magyar, Varga's ex-husband, as a prominent political figure. Magyar's Tisza Party would subsequently defeat Fidesz in a landslide in the 2026 parliamentary election.

== Bicske children's home case ==
Between 2004 and 2016, the director of the Kossuth Zsuzsa Children's Home in Bicske, János Vásárhelyi, was accused of forcing ten minors to perform oral sex on him in exchange for various concessions. In 2016, after one of the victims committed suicide, another abused boy alerted his child protection guardian about the abuse, who immediately moved him to another children's home without further investigation. The deputy director, Endre Kónya, then blackmailed the child, threatening that if he did not withdraw his accusation, his cousin would also be relocated. The deputy director was convicted of coercion at the first trial in 2019 and at the appeal trial in 2021, for which he received a prison sentence of three years and four months, with a five-year ban from his profession and from public office as an additional punishment. The director was sentenced to eight years' imprisonment.

== Pardon ==
=== Legal background ===
The clemency procedure in Hungary is initiated either ex officio or on the basis of a written request signed by the person concerned. An application for pardon may be made by the accused, the defence, the legal representative of the accused or a relative of the accused. The court shall submit the request for pardon to the Minister of Justice within eight days who in all cases, countersigns and submits the request for pardon to the President. The President decides on the merits of the request, and may decide to grant the pardon without stating his/her grounds. The decision of the President takes effect on the day of the pardon decision, but the Minister's countersignature is required for the decision to be valid. Pardon decisions are final and irrevocable, and are in principle not public and are not published anywhere. Novák previously gave a brief explanation in such cases, and this is not prohibited by law.

=== Granting of pardon ===
The Hungarian news publication 444.hu first reported on 2 February 2024 that according to a document available in the Collection of Court Decisions, Novák granted a presidential pardon to Kónya on 27 April 2023 according the decision of the Curia of Hungary of September 2023. On that day, Novák granted a total of 22 pardons, which she justified by Pope Francis' pastoral visit to Hungary. Kónya challenged his sentence in a third appeal in parallel with the application for pardon. The decision on the pardon was taken during the Curia proceedings and was included in the text of the September third appeal decision. Kónya was under house arrest at the time of the pardon decision, with nine months remaining in his sentence. The pardon decision suspended the remainder of the sentence of imprisonment imposed in the case for a probationary period of 5 years and waived the remainder of the sentence of prohibition from public office, and exempted him from the criminal record disqualifications in relation to the conviction. The case is currently under investigation, as on March 10, 2024, RTL's program Házon kívül presented that Endre Kónya met one of the former abusers in a park at the end of February, and this time he also tried to get him to retract his confession on video, in which he accused him of influencing her, but the young man refused.

In an article published on 11 February, Telex.hu and Direkt36.hu reported that the pardon was issued under pressure from Zoltán Balog, Novák's mentor and synodal president of the Hungarian Reformed Church. It is known that Balog also nominated the later convicted director of the foster home for a state medal in 2016, and Balog himself became a member of Novák's presidential advisory board. According to sources familiar with the two, Balog, after leaving the government, had considerable influence on Novák in the Sándor Palace, while according to the law, the position of President of Hungary must function independently of any other branch of power, including the church. According to these sources, those involved in the clemency process did not think that the granting of the pardon would come to light. Meanwhile, it has also emerged that Balog had arranged a meeting between Novák and Kónya's wife. On 13 February, Balog responded to the allegations, saying that he had not submitted the request for clemency, but that he had been consulted and had decided to support it, which he had done wrong, but he apologised to those he believed he owed an apology to, while also claiming Novák took her decision independently of him in a sovereign manner.

== Reactions ==
When Kónya's pardon was made public on 2 February 2024, a national controversy ensued, becoming known simply as "the Pardon Affair" (Hungarian: kegyelmi ügy). Protests erupted in Budapest demanding Novák's resignation, with commentators viewing the scandal as damaging to Fidesz's credibility as a defender of traditional family values. On 9 February, Novák cut short her attendance at the World Aquatics Championships in Qatar and flew home to Budapest, where she announced her resignation on 10 February. In her resignation address, she apologized to Kónya's victims. Varga also resigned from her parliamentary seat and withdrew her candidacy for member of the European Parliament in the 2024 election. In response, the Prime Minister of Hungary, Viktor Orbán, said he would introduce a constitutional amendment to bar convicted child abusers from receiving clemency. As part of the fallout from the scandal, Balog resigned from the synodal presidency of the Hungarian Reformed Church on 16 February.

On 10 February, Péter Magyar, Judit Varga's ex-husband, announced his resignation from all public positions and sharply criticized Fidesz political figures, especially Antal Rogán, accusing them of "hiding behind women's skirts," referring to his ex-wife and Novák. In a longform interview published on 11 February on the political YouTube channel Partizán, Magyar alleged that his ex-wife did not support Kónya's clemency request while a minister; he added, however, that he did not know why she had signed the pardon if she had opposed it. On 16 February, a large demonstration was held on Heroes' Square in Budapest organized by more than one hundred celebrities and public figures, including prominent Hungarian singer Azahriah. 50,000 to 160,000 people attended the demonstration.

By law, the National Assembly had to accept Novák's resignation before it could take effect. There is no line of succession under Hungarian law; instead, when a vacancy occurs, the speaker of the National Assembly (at the time, László Kövér) temporarily becomes acting president until a successor is inaugurated. The Assembly accepted Novák's resignation on 26 February and elected Tamás Sulyok to succeed her. On 6 April, Magyar led a rally in Kossuth Square in Budapest attended by tens of thousands of people. Four days later, he announced that he would, as the prime-ministerial candidate of the previously marginal Tisza Party, contest the 2026 parliamentary election. Magyar ultimately became Tisza's leader and led it to a landslide electoral victory, ousting Fidesz from power.

== After the 2026 change of government ==
=== Release of relating documents ===
Following the 2026 change of government, the Magyar Government's Ministry of Justice and the President's Office released the documents relating to the scandal, including a memo relating to the verdict in the Hunnia case, a memo dated 3 April 2023 on the current status of pardon proposals, and the cover page of the fourth pardon proposal of 2023 submitted by the Minister of Justice. According to these documents, neither the Justice Minister nor the president's Chief of Staff recommended Kónya's pardon, but Novák granted it nevertheless. She did so on the 27 April, with Varga countersigning it the same day. Magyar commented that he found this swiftness strange, as these procedures usually take weeks. According to the documents, Novák asked that the pardon decision be finalized before Pope Francis's 2023 apostolic visit to Hungary.

=== Parliamentary inquiry committee ===
In May 2026, the Magyar Government established five parliamentary inquiry committees, including an "Investigative Committee to Identify Those Responsible for the Pardon Scandal." These committees consist of six representatives: three from Tisza, and one from each of the three opposition parties (Fidesz, the Christian Democrats, and Our Homeland Movement).

== See also ==
- Pál Schmitt academic misconduct controversy
- Szőlő Street scandal
