= Gábor Török =

Gábor Török may refer to:

- Gábor Török (footballer) (1936–2004), Hungarian football goalkeeper
- Gábor Török (political scientist) (born 1971), Hungarian political scientist and historian
