= András Baka =

President of Hungary since 2026

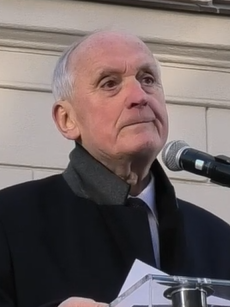
- Baka in 2025

President of Hungary
- Incumbent
- Assumed office 19 August 2026
- Prime Minister: Péter Magyar
- Preceded by: Tamás Sulyok (Note: Ágnes Forsthoffer served as acting president between the end of Sulyok's term and Baka's assumption of office.)

President of the Supreme Court
- In office 25 June 2009 – 31 December 2011
- Preceded by: Zoltán Lomnici
- Succeeded by: Péter Darák (as President of the Curia)

Judge of the European Court of Human Rights from Hungary
- In office 23 April 1991 – 31 January 2008
- Preceded by: Position established
- Succeeded by: András Sajó

Member of the National Assembly
- In office 2 May 1990 – 31 May 1991
Union leadership positions
President of the Confederation of Unions of Professionals
In office 20 September 1989 – May 1990
Preceded by	Union established
Succeeded by	László Kis Papp
President of the Trade Union of Scientific and Innovation Workers
In office 25 June 1988 – May 1990
Preceded by	Union established
Succeeded by	László Kuti

Personal details
- Born: András Bálint Baka; 11 December 1952 (age 73) Budapest, Hungarian PR
- Party: Independent
- Other political affiliations: Hungarian Democratic Forum (1990–1991)
- Spouse: Katalin Kövesdi (m. 1977)
- Children: 2
- Education: ELTE Faculty of Law
- Occupation: Jurist; professor

András Bálint Baka (Note: Hungarian pronunciation: [ˈɒndraːʃ ˈbɒkɒ]) (born 11 December 1952) is a Hungarian jurist and politician who has served as President of Hungary since August 2026. He previously served as president of the Supreme Court of Hungary from 2009 to 2011 and was a member of the National Assembly from 1990 to 1991.

== Early life ==
Baka was born on 11 December 1952 in Budapest. He obtained a degree in law from the ELTE Faculty of Law in 1978.

== Legal career ==
Baka's career began as a legal scholar at the Institute for Legal Studies of the Hungarian Academy of Sciences. He next served as director general of the College of Public Administration.

From 1988 to 1990, Baka served as president of the Trade Union of Scientific and Innovation Workers. From 1989 to 1990, he served as president of the Confederation of Unions of Professionals.

From 1990 to 1991, Baka was an independent member of the National Assembly, elected from the Hungarian Democratic Forum's party list.

=== Judge of the European Court of Human Rights (1991–2008) ===
For two terms, from 1991 to 2008, Baka was the Hungarian judge of the European Court of Human Rights.

=== President of the Supreme Court (2009–2011) ===
From 2009 to 2011, Baka served as president (chief justice) of the Supreme Court. He was appointed to the office by a vote of the National Assembly. At the time, he was described as an independent and "somewhat old-school" lawyer.

Baka was removed from the office in 2011 by the government of Prime Minister Viktor Orbán, three years before Baka's term was to set to expire. The removal was achieved by Fidesz, Orbán's political party, using its parliamentary supermajority to modify the constitution to rename the Supreme Court the Curia (which had been its historical name in the Kingdom of Hungary). Fidesz argued that this effectively replaced the Supreme Court with a new institution that the National Assembly could then appoint a new chief justice for.

Baka challenged the legality of his removal at the European Court of Human Rights, which determined, in 2014, that his removal had indeed been unlawful. Specifically, the ECHR held that the Fidesz government had violated Baka's right to a fair trial and to freedom of expression. The ruling also concluded that Baka had been removed due to his criticism of the Orbán government and that this action had thus damaged democratic freedoms in Hungary. The Orbán government rejected the findings of the ruling; as the ECHR lacks enforcement powers, no further action could be taken.

== Presidency (2026–present) ==
On 8 August 2026, the Tisza Party nominated Baka to be elected by the National Assembly to serve as the new President of Hungary. Parliamentary members of the party selected him as their nominee from among other candidates on a shortlist in a vote held by secret ballot. This came after Prime Minister Péter Magyar's initial preferred candidate for president, Judit Polgár, declined to be considered for the office. The National Assembly is set to vote on the appointment of a new president on 11 August. With the Tisza Party holding a supermajority in the legislature, Baka's appointment succeeded without obstacle. Baka remains a political independent, not being a member of the any party. Budapest mayor Gergely Karácsony welcomed Baka's nomination saying that "the NER [i.e. Orbán's system] began with the firing of András Baka, and now it ends with his election as President of the Republic".

The previous president, Tamás Sulyok, had been removed by an amendment to the constitution. Prime Minister Magyar had sought Sulyok's removal, asserting that Sulyok was a loyalist to ousted strongman former prime minister Orbán. While objecting to it, Sulyok had signed the amendment himself after its passage by the National Assembly. Three weeks prior to being tapped for the presidency himself, Baka had expressed his cautious optimism at the removal of Sulyok; telling the Canadian radio program As It Happens that he believes that successful transition away from the era of Orbán's consolidated rule requires "extraordinary measures." The same amendment that removed Sulyok also stipulates that the new president will stay in office either for a maximum of five years or until a new constitution goes into effect. Hungary's presidency is a largely ceremonial office.

On 11 August 2026, Baka was elected as the eighth president of Hungary by the Tisza Party's parliamentary supermajority. His term began on 19 August 2026.

== Personal life ==
Baka's father, also named András, was a machine fitter, and his mother, Margit Maurer, was a high-school teacher specializing in Hungarian and German. He has one younger sister. In 1977, Baka married Katalin Kövesdi, who is also a teacher. They have two children.

== Notes ==
Legal offices
Preceded by Zoltán Lomnici	President of the Supreme Court; 2009–2011	Succeeded by Péter Darák as President of the Curia
Political offices
Preceded by Tamás Sulyok	President of Hungary; 2026–present	Incumbent
