= 2024 Hungarian presidential election =

- 26 February 2024

Needed to win: Two-thirds of all members of the National Assembly (first ballot) 198 MPs, 133 votes needed to win
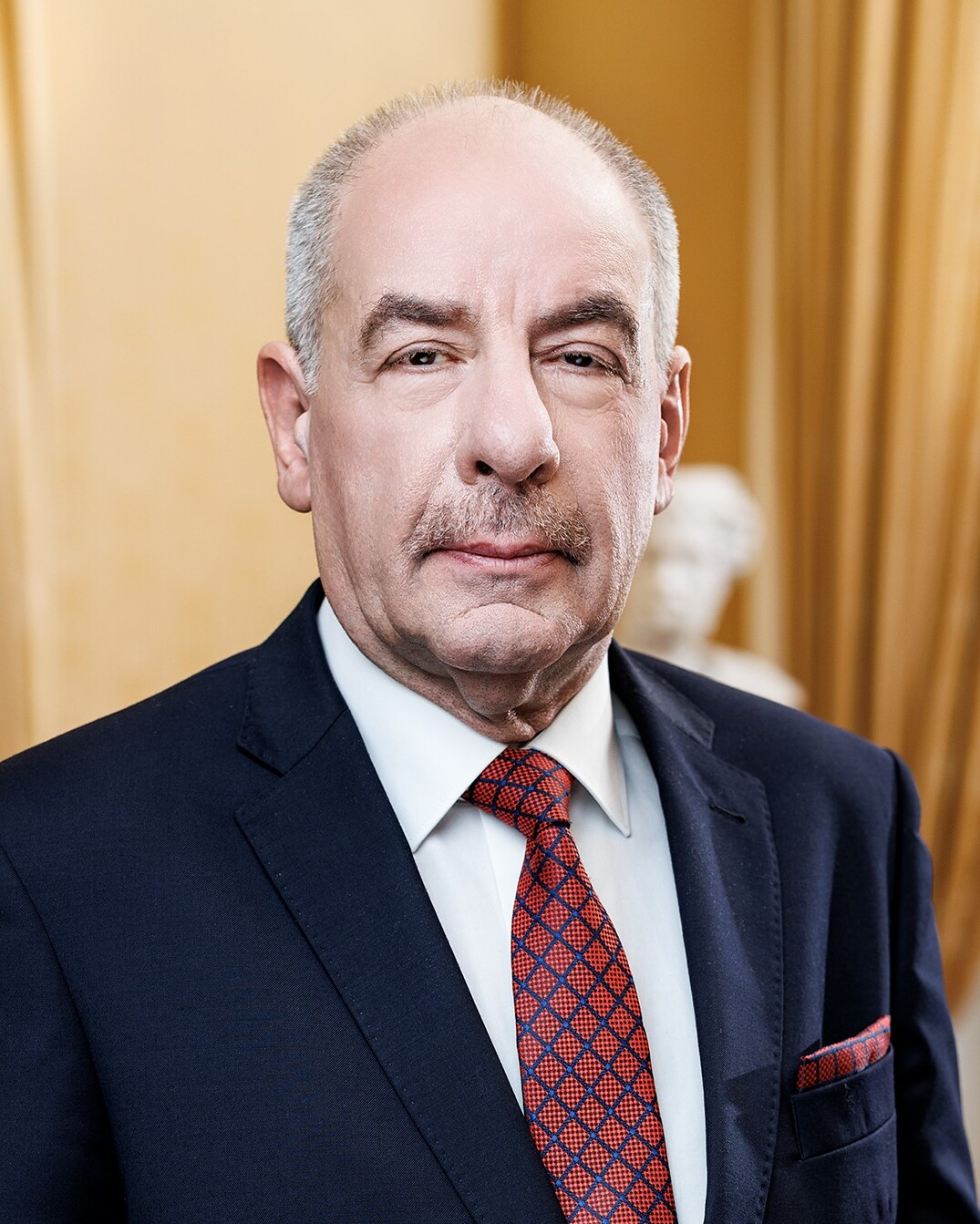

Nominee	Tamás Sulyok	Against
Party	Independent
Alliance	Fidesz–KDNP
Electoral vote	134	5
Percentage	96.40%	3.60%
President before election
László Kövér
(acting)
Fidesz
Elected
President
Tamás Sulyok
Independent

An early indirect presidential election was held in Hungary on 26 February 2024, following the resignation of Katalin Novák. Incumbent President of the Constitutional Court Tamás Sulyok was elected with a two-thirds majority.

== Background ==
On 10 February 2024 President Katalin Novák announced her resignation (effective upon approval by Parliament) over the controversial pardon of a vice principal of a foster home in Bicske, who tried to cover up the principal's crimes when the latter was charged for child molestation. The vice principal's pardon became known to the public on 2 February 2024, after which protests demanding Novák's resignation took place.

The opposition alliance United for Hungary called for the direct election of the President of the Republic in their manifesto for the 2022 parliamentary election, which would require amending or replacing the current constitution. On 25 February, opposition parties held a rally in Budapest calling for direct presidential elections.

On 26 February the National Assembly formally accepted Novák's resignation, leading to the termination of her mandate.

== Electoral system ==
Under the current Constitution of Hungary adopted by the Fidesz–KDNP government coalition in 2011, the President of the Republic is elected via secret ballot by the National Assembly, no sooner than sixty but no later than thirty days before expiry of the mandate (five years) of the previous office-holder, or if their mandate terminated prematurely, within thirty days of the termination. The constitution authorizes the Speaker of the National Assembly to set the date for the election.

A presidential candidate needs the written nomination of at least one-fifth of the Members of Parliament (thus 40 MPs), who may not nominate more than one candidate. In the first round of the election, a two-thirds majority of all incumbent MPs is required to elect the president. If this condition is not fulfilled, a second round is held between the two candidates who received the highest and second highest numbers of votes in the first round. (Since 1990, there have been no more than two candidates in any presidential election.) A simple majority of the voting MPs is then sufficient. If only one candidate is nominated, the assembly votes on whether to confirm or reject their election to the presidency, with each MP being allowed to vote either for or against, but not to cast their vote for an alternative candidate.

== Results ==
MPs from Democratic Coalition, Jobbik, Momentum Movement, Hungarian Socialist Party, and Dialogue walked out of the National Assembly in protest.

Candidate	Nominated by	Votes	%
Tamás Sulyok	Fidesz–KDNP	134	91.78
Against		5	3.24
Total minimum		133	
Valid votes		139	95.21
Invalid/blank votes		7	4.79
Voters		146	100
Absentees		53	26.63
Total/turnout		199	73.37
