= Baka v. Hungary =

European Court of Human Rights case

Baka v. Hungary was a case of the European Court of Human Rights (ECtHR) heard by the second section of the court in 2014 and the Grand Chamber in 2016. Both the section and the Grand Chamber found that Hungary had violated the rights of András Baka, the former head of Hungary's supreme court who was dismissed after criticizing the government's judicial reforms.

== Background ==
András Baka is a Hungarian judge who served on the European Court of Human Rights (ECtHR) from 1991–2008. In 2009, he was appointed president of Hungary's Supreme Court for a six-year term and additionally president of the National Council of Justice, where one of his statutory duties was to comment on reforms to the judiciary. In 2011, a set of judicial reforms were adopted in order to permit a new government to appoint a new head of the supreme court and ensure that Baka was not eligible for the post. Baka's lawyer said, "The case was not about the money. The lesson is that such things cannot be done under the rule of law".

Baka's sacking was criticized by European institutions, and the European Commission launched an infringement at the European Court of Justice against aspects of Hungary's judicial reforms. In Case C-286/12, the CJEU ruled that the reduction of the mandatory retirement age breached European Union law. The Hungarian Helsinki Committee, Hungarian Civil Liberties Union, and Eötvös Károly Institute submitted third-party interventions in the case.

== Verdict ==
On 27 May 2014, the second section unanimously ruled that Baka's freedom of speech (Article 10) and access to a tribunal to defend his rights (Article 6 (1)) had been violated. Subsequently, the case was appealed to the Grand Chamber of the European Court of Human Rights. On 23 June 2016, the Grand Chamber delivered its verdict, confirming entirely the previous verdict. The court disagreed with the Hungarian government's position that Baka's dismissal was a side effect of broader reforms, and found that the legislation was directed specifically against Baka. Furthermore, it found a violation of Article 10 because there was prima facie evidence that Baka's statements had caused his dismissal. The court also stated that there would be a chilling effect that would dissuade other judges from participation in public debate.

Of 17 judges ruling in the case, there were two dissenting and two concurring opinions. The concurring opinion by Portuguese judge Paulo Pinto de Albuquerque and Russian judge Dmitry Dedov focuses on the court's power to review whether constitutional changes are compatible with the ECHR. The dissenting opinion by Polish judge Krzysztof Wojtyczek questions the applicability of Article 10 to the case, as in Wojtyczek's opinion Article 10 only applies to speech in a personal rather than official capacity. There was also a concurring opinion by Greek judge Linos-Alexandre Sicilianos and a dissenting opinion by Czech judge Aleš Pejchal.

== Reactions ==
The ECtHR has implemented the principles of the Baka judgement in later cases concerning the rule of law including the Grand Chamber cases Denisov v. Ukraine and Ramos Nunes Carvalho e Sá v. Portugal. In contrast to multiple previous judgements by the Inter-American Court of Human Rights, the ECtHR did not assimilate the independence of the judiciary as part of the guarantee of a fair trial. This was criticized by multiple commentators, as being a more convincing reason for finding a violation in the Baka case.

Czech scholars Katarína Šipulová and David Kosař criticized the judgement as an ineffective response to Viktor Orbán's "abusive constitutionalism" because the court "overlooked the main structural problem behind Mr. Baka’s dismissal (the broad powers of court presidents in CEE), it has blurred the Convention’s understanding of the concept of the rule of law, and it failed in delivering persuasive judgment firmly based on the existing ECtHR’s case law".

The verdict has not been implemented by Hungary. In September 2021, the Committee of Ministers of the Council of Europe, which is tasked with supervising the implementation of ECtHR judgements, asked Hungary to submit an action plan for implementing the judgement by 16 December.
