= András Kepes =

Hungarian journalist

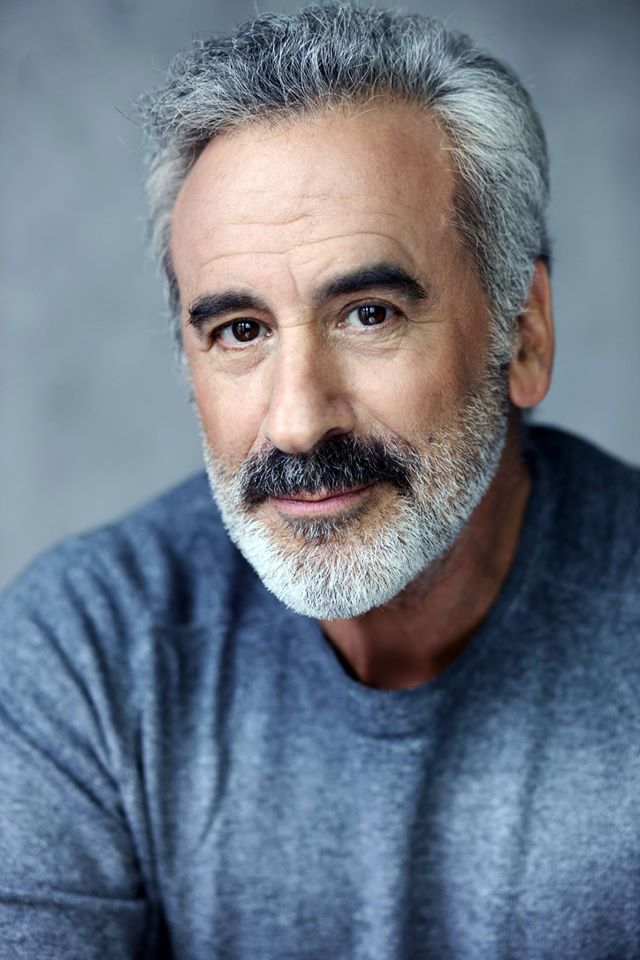
- Kepes in 2019
- Born: 11 October 1948 (age 78); Budapest, Hungary
- Education: Eötvös Loránd University
- Occupations: Author; television host; documentary filmmaker; academic

András Kepes (born 11 October 1948) is a Hungarian author, television host, documentary filmmaker and academic. He is Professor of film and media and Chair of the Council of Arts of the Budapest Metropolitan University (METU).

== Life ==
András Kepes was born in Budapest, Hungary, and grew up in his native city, as well as in Beirut and Buenos Aires, where his father, Imre Kepes was stationed as a diplomat. He lives in Budapest with his wife, Mária Dettai. He has six children: Júlia (b. 1974), Borbála (b. 1975), Rozália (b. 1990), Kata (b. 1998), Lujza (b. 2005), and Lukács (b. 2011).

== Education ==
Educated in Hungary, Lebanon, Argentina and the U.S. he earned and MA in literature and aesthetics from Eötvös Loránd University (ELTE), Doctor of Liberal Arts (equivalent of PhD.) and Dr. habil. of film and video from the University of Theatre and Film Arts, Budapest. He was a John S. Knight Fellow Fellow at Stanford University and a Fulbright Scholar at New York University (NYU).

== Career ==
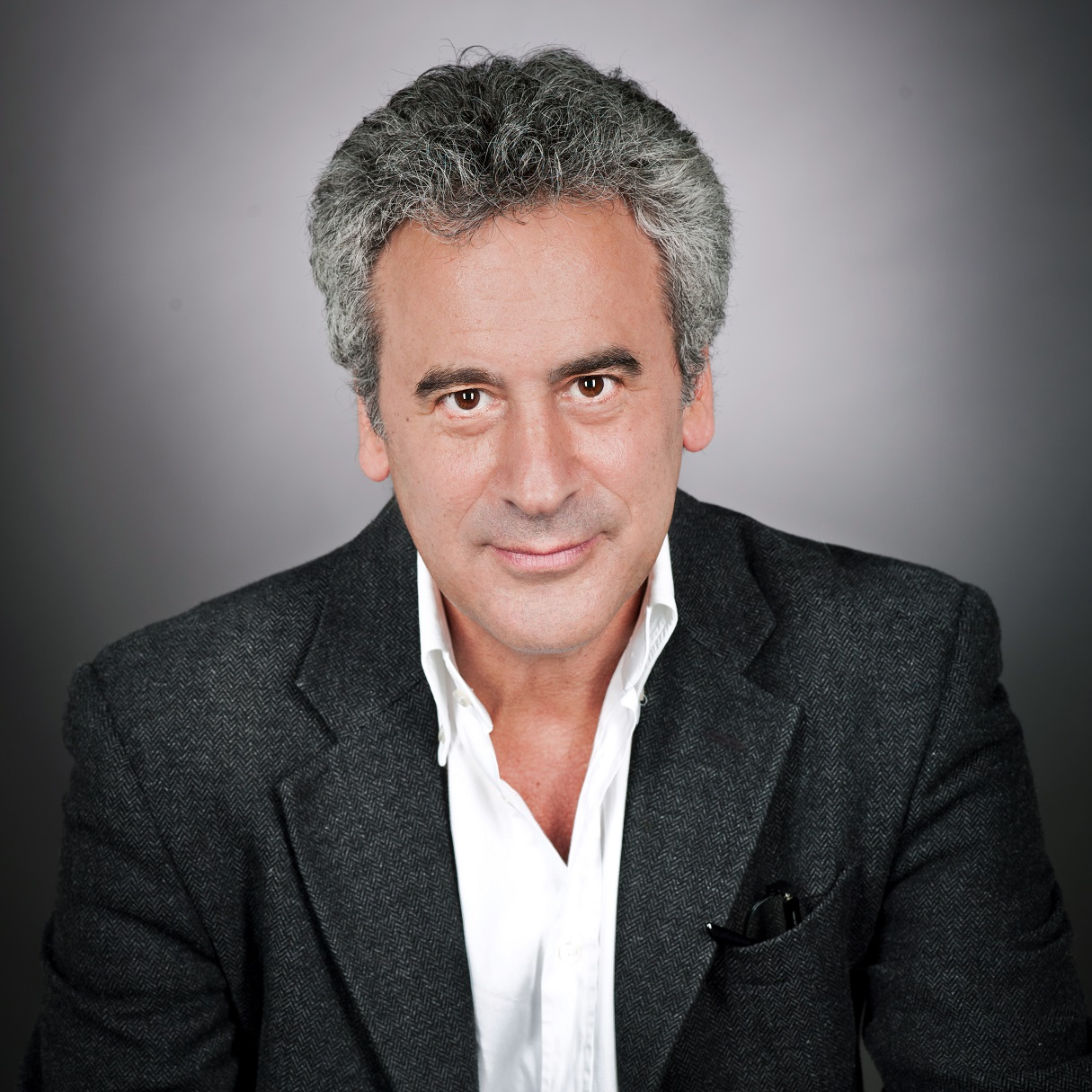
On METU in 2007

As a senior producer and host of the most popular Hungarian TV channels, Kepes has produced cultural programs and documentaries in Hungary as well as in more than 40 countries around the world. In them, he has covered a wild range of topics including the most important International film festivals, the Nobel Prize ceremonies, the life of native people in the Andes, in the Canadian Rockies, in the rainforest of the Amazons and in the deserts of Asia, the coexistence of cultural minorities in Africa, the Chinese culture after the cataclysmic political changes, modernism and traditions in Kuwait and Japan, the Tibetan culture in the Himalayas, Yugoslavia during the war, American cinema and Latin-American literature. To mention but a few guest actors and directors of his shows: Woody Allen, Lindsey Anderson, Peter Brook, Glenn Close, Federico Fellini, Elia Kazan, Gina Lollobrigida, Marcello Mastroianni, Jean Marais, Yves Montand, Fernando Rey, Martin Scorsese, Donald Sutherland, Billy Wilder; musicians: Dave Brubeck, Donovan, Steve Reich; writers: Alejo Carpentier, Julio Cortázar, Gabriel García Márquez, Octavio Paz, Juan Rulfo, Mario Vargas Llosa; visual artists: André Kertész, Antoni Tapies, Alexandre Trauner, and even the Dalai Lama. As a visiting lecturer and later as a professor in film and media studies he has taught at various universities. From 2008, he is Professor of film and media at the Budapest Metropolitan University. Between 2010 and 2014, he was Dean of the Faculty of Communication and Arts of this university. Since 2008, the main focus of his career has been writing.

== Books ==
- Tövispuszta (Thorn-desert) novel, revised edition, Libri, 2017
- Világkép (Worldview), literary essay, Libri, Budapest, 2016, revised edition 2017
- The Inflatable Buddha, novel, Armadillo Central, London, 2013
- Tövispuszta (Thorn-desert), novel, Ulpius-ház, Budapest, 2011
- Maendene Sat Skakmat, documentary novel, Informations Forlag, Kobenhaven, 2010
- Matt a férfiaknak (Checkmate to Men), documentary novel, Alexandra, 2008
- Könyv-jelző (Bookmark), selection of 20th century World Literature, Park, 2002
- Könyv-jelző (Bookmark), selection of Contemporary Hungarian Writers, Park, 2002
- Könyv-jelző (Bookmark), selection of Classical Hungarian Writers, Park, 2001
- Kepes Krónika - történetek, (Stories), Park, 2000
- Kepes Krónika - beszélgetések (Interviews), Park, 1999
- Szerencsés útjaim (My Nice Trips), reports, Múzsák, 1986

== Board and committee memberships ==
- 2010-12 Member of the Art Board of the Hungarian Accreditation Committee
- 2004-06 Member of the Art and Communication Board of the Hungarian Accreditation Committee
- 1999- Curator of the Joseph Pulitzer Memorial Prize Board
- 1995-97 Delegate of Hungary at the International Program for Development of Communication (IPDC) of UNESCO, Paris
- 1993-94 Curator of the Táncsics Prize Board
- 1990-94 Member of the Presidency of the Association of Hungarian Film and Television Artists
- 1990-94 Chairman of the Organization of Hungarian Television Journalists

== Awards ==
- 2017 Arany Könyv − nominee (for Világkép)
- 2017 Libri Literary Reader's Award − for Világkép
- 2011 Prima Award
- 2011 Arany Könyv (Golden Book) nominee (for his novel: Tövispuszta)
- 2005 Déri János Prize
- 1998 Officer's Cross of the Order of Merit of the Hungarian Republic
- 1997 Tolerance Award
- 1996 Opus Award
- 1995 Magyar Lajos Prize
- 1995 Press Box Award: Best Reporter
- 1994 Pulitzer Memorial Prize
- 1991 Táncsics Prize
