= 1995 Hungarian presidential election =

- 19 June 1995

Needed to win: Two-thirds of all members of the National Assembly (first ballot) 386 MPs, 257 votes needed to win
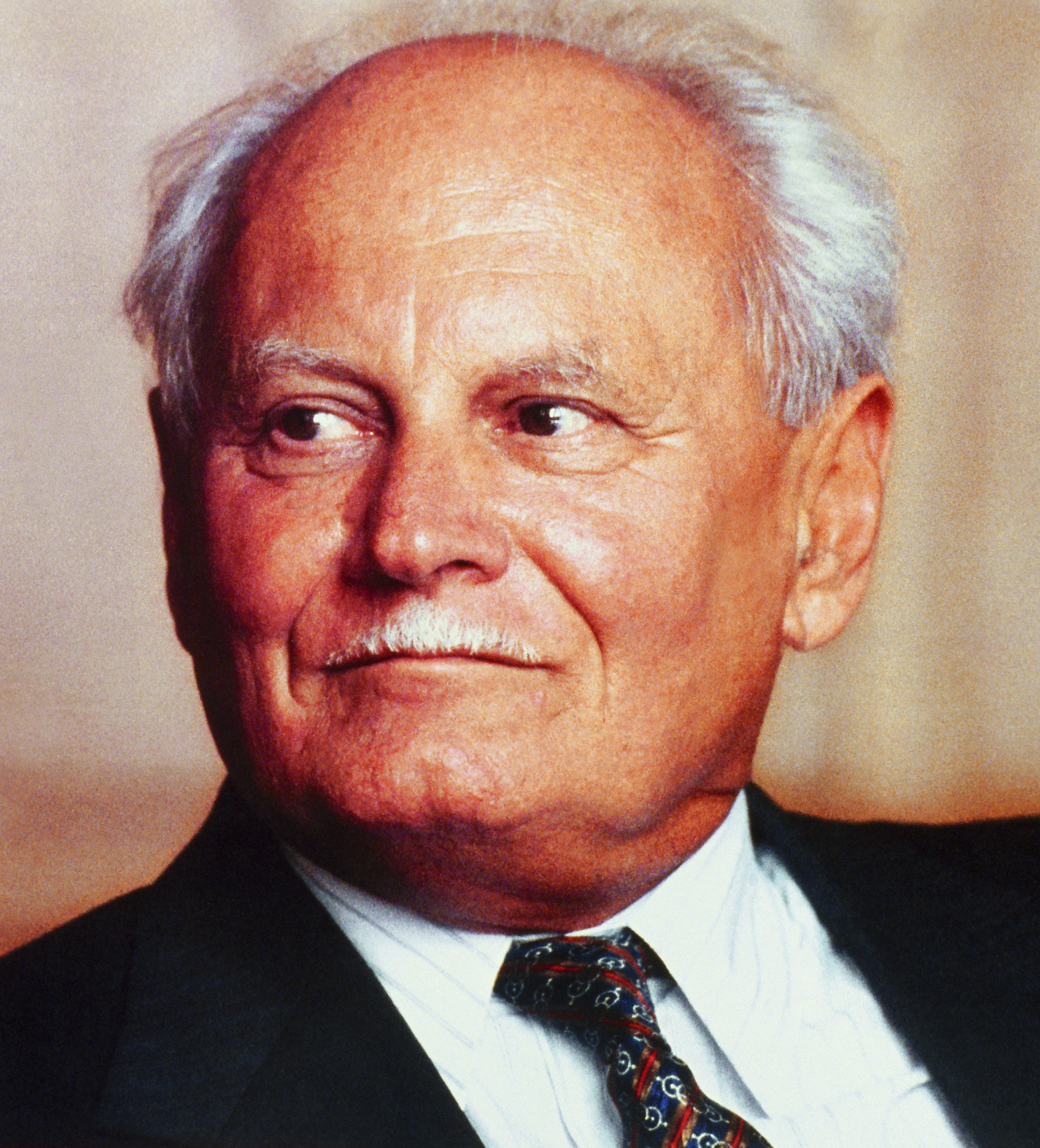

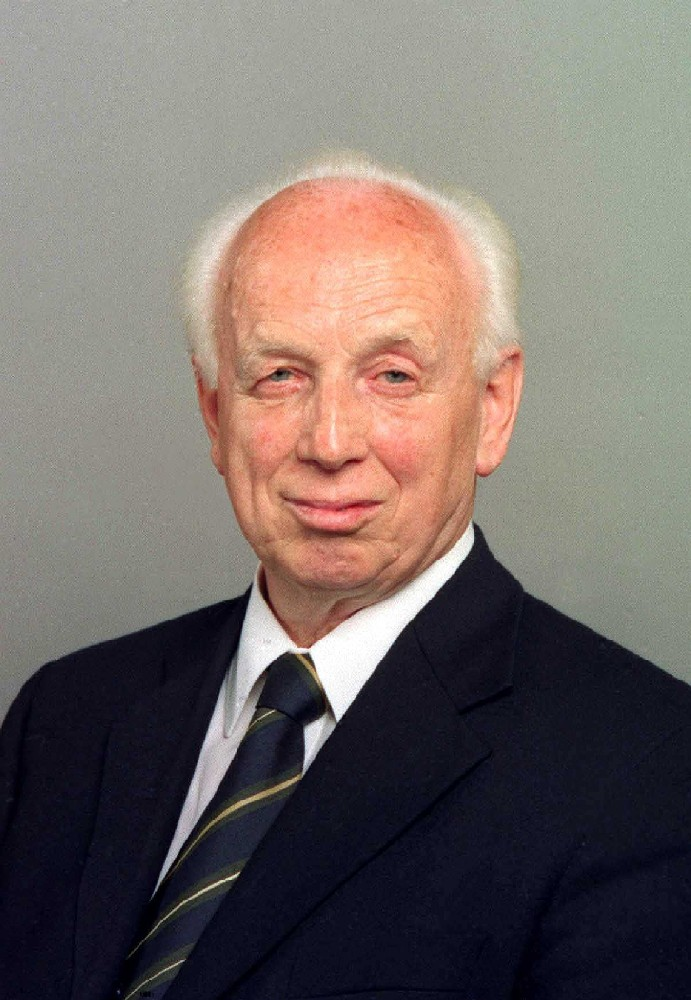
Nominee	Árpád Göncz	Ferenc Mádl
Party	SZDSZ	Independent
Alliance	MSZP–SZDSZ	MDF–KDNP–Fidesz
Electoral vote	259	76
Percentage	77.31%	22.69%
President before election
Árpád Göncz
SZDSZ
Elected President
Árpád Göncz
SZDSZ

The second indirect presidential election was held in Hungary on 19 June 1995. Incumbent President Árpád Göncz was re-elected for a second term with two-third majority. Until 2026, this was the last election not won by a candidate supported by Fidesz.

== Results ==
Candidate	Party	Votes	%
Árpád Göncz	Alliance of Free Democrats	259	77.31
Ferenc Mádl	Independent	76	22.69
Total		335	100.00
Valid votes		335	93.06
Invalid/blank votes		25	6.94
Total votes		360	100.00
Registered voters/turnout		386	93.26
