= 2000 Hungarian presidential election =

- 5–6 June 2000

Needed to win: Two-thirds of all members of the National Assembly (first and second ballot), majority of voting MPs (third ballot) First and second ballot: 386 MPs, 257 votes needed to win Third ballot: 386 voting MPs, 194 votes needed to win
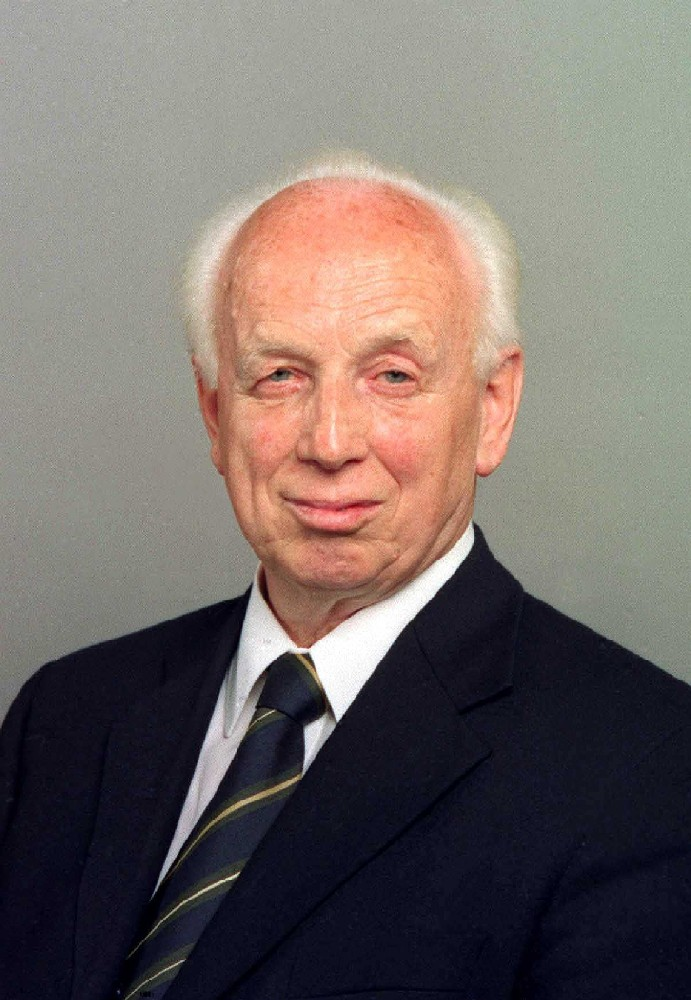

Nominee	Ferenc Mádl	Against
Party	Independent
Alliance	Fidesz–FKGP–MDF
Electoral vote	243	96
Percentage	71.68%	28.32
President before election
Árpád Göncz
SZDSZ
Elected President
Ferenc Mádl
Independent

An indirect presidential election was held in Hungary on 5–6 June 2000. Incumbent President Árpád Göncz was ineligible for a third term due to constitutional limits. Former Minister of Education Ferenc Mádl was elected with an absolute majority.

== Background ==
The term for the post of president in Hungary is 5 years. After the 2 consecutive terms of the previous office holder, Árpád Göncz, the succession was somewhat problematic. Though the coalition partner in the first cabinet of Viktor Orbán had its own candidate, party chairman József Torgyán, the leading party wanted another person. In the end Torgyán withdrew from the process.

== Candidates ==
The only candidate was legal scholar and Former Minister of Education Ferenc Mádl, who was nominated formally by FKGP, but with the support of governing Fidesz and MDF parties. The opposition parties did not nominate any candidates. In the first two rounds, two-thirds majority requirement needed to elect the president, while in the third round an absolute majority is enough, according to the Constitution.

After three rounds, Mádl was elected President of Hungary, taking the office on 4 August in that year.

== Results ==
Candidate	Party	First round		Second round		Third round	
Candidate	Party	Votes	%	Votes	%	Votes	%
Ferenc Mádl	Independent	251	70.51	238	69.79	243	71.68
Against		105	29.49	103	30.21	96	28.32
Total		356	100.00	341	100.00	339	100.00
Valid votes		356	98.07	341	96.06	339	96.58
Invalid/blank votes		7	1.93	14	3.94	12	3.42
Total votes		363	100.00	355	100.00	351	100.00
Registered voters/turnout		386	94.04	386	91.97	386	90.93
Source: Parliament
