= Gábor Török (political scientist) =

Hungarian political scientist

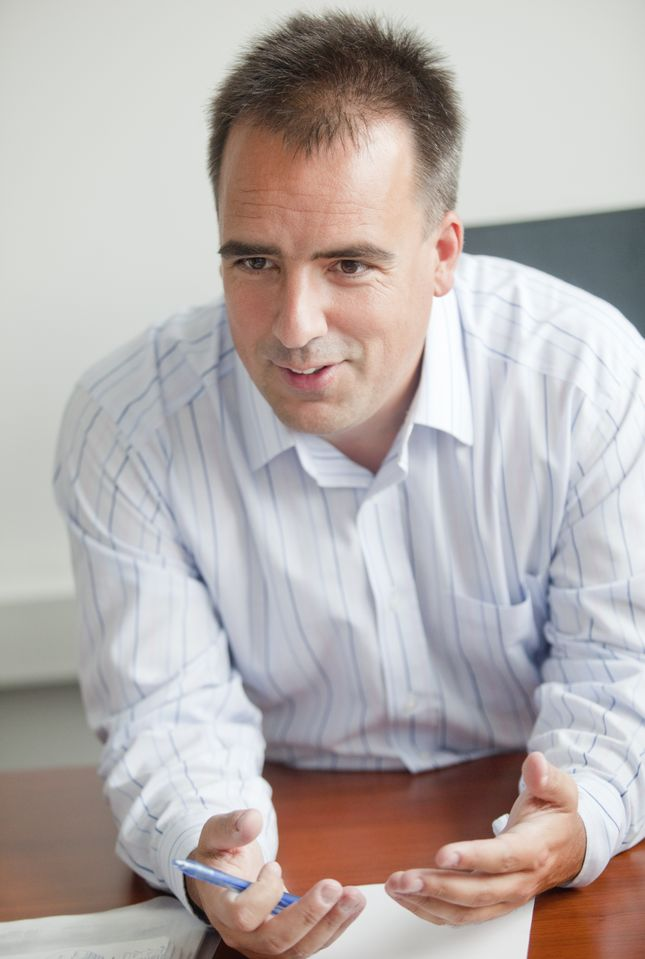
- Gábor Török
- Born: 11 August 1971 (age 55); Szombathely, Hungary
- Education: Loránd Eötvös University
- Occupations: political scientist, historian

Gábor Török (born 11 August 1971) is a Hungarian political scientist and historian, associate professor at the Institute of Political Science of the Corvinus University of Budapest.

== Biography ==
Gábor Török was born in Szombathely on 11 August 1971. He graduated from Nagy Lajos Secondary School, located in Szombathely, in 1989. He received his diplomas from the Eötvös Loránd University in history and political theory, both with distinction. In 1997, he placed first in the National Academic Student Conference. He received the Pro Scientia gold-medal in 1998 for excellence in studies and preeminent academic achievement. He earned his PhD summa cum laude from the Faculty of Law and Political Sciences in 2005.

He teaches at the Corvinus University of Budapest since 1997. Currently, he is the head of the Center for Political Analysis at the universities Institute of Political Science. He is an associate professor since 2009. He was awarded a certificate of merit by the rector of the university in 2005 in appreciation of his teaching and research work. He received the „ Teacher of the year” award in 2008. He is a visiting lecturer at the Zsigmond Király College, the Delta Political School, Századvég Political School as well as the Academy of Drama and Film.

Török was elected to the local representative body in Aszófő during the Hungarian local elections in 2010. He planned to run as an independent candidate in the parliamentary by-election at Veszprém in early 2015, however, following the outbreak of the so-called "Orbán–Simicska media war", stepped down.

== Works ==
He specializes in the analysis of the political system following the regime change, as well as in political and strategic analysis; wrote his doctoral dissertation on the topic of political agendas. He was a writer, co-writer or editor of eight books, of which two are widely used university text-books in Hungary. He was elected the secretary-general of the Hungarian Political Association for three years respectively in the years 2000 and 2003. Member of the presidium of the association since 2006.

=== Main publications ===
- András Körösényi - Csaba Tóth - Gábor Török (2009): The Hungarian Political System. Hungarian Democracy Series. Volume 1. Budapest, Hungarian Center for Democracy Studies Foundation
- Török, Gábor (2005): A politikai napirend (Political Agenda). Budapest, Akadémiai Kiadó.
- Török Gábor (2012): The Political System in Hungary. In Wojciech Gizicki (ed): Political Systems of Visegrad Group Countries. Trnava-Lublin, 43–70.
- Török, Gábor (2017): A lakott sziget (Inhabited Island). Budapest, Atheneum Kiadó.
