= Fundamental Law of Hungary =

Overview
- Jurisdiction: Hungary
- Ratified: 18 April 2011
- Date effective: 1 January 2012
- System: Unitary parliamentary republic

Government structure
- Branches: 3
- Head of state: President
- Chambers: Unicameral (National Assembly)
- Executive: Government
- Judiciary: Curia (Supreme Court); Constitutional Court
- Federalism: Unitary
- Electoral college: No

History
- Amendments: 17
- Last amended: 18 July 2026 (took effect 19 July 2026)
- Citation: "Magyarország Alaptörvénye". (in Hungarian) "The Fundamental Law of Hungary". (in English)
- Author: Parliamentary Committee
- Signatories: Pál Schmitt
- Supersedes: Hungarian Constitution of 1949

Full text
- Fundamental Law of Hungary at Wikisource
- Fundamental Law of Hungary at Hungarian Wikisource

The Fundamental Law of Hungary (Hungarian: Magyarország alaptörvénye), the country's constitution, was adopted by Parliament (the National Assembly) on 18 April 2011, promulgated by the president a week later and entered into force on 1 January 2012. It is Hungary's first constitution adopted within a democratic framework and following free elections.

The document succeeded the 1949 Hungarian Constitution, originally adopted at the creation of the Hungarian People's Republic on 20 August 1949 and heavily amended on 23 October 1989. The 1949 Constitution was Hungary's first permanent written constitution; until it was replaced, Hungary was the only former Eastern Bloc nation without an entirely new constitution after the end of Communism.

Both domestically and abroad, the Fundamental Law has been the subject of controversy. Among the claims critics make are that it was adopted without sufficient input from the opposition and society at large, that it reflects the ideology of the ruling Fidesz party, and enshrines it in office, that it is rooted in a conservative Christian worldview despite Hungary not being a particularly devout country, and that it curtails and politicizes previously independent institutions. The government that enacted the charter dismissed such assertions, saying it was enshrined lawfully and reflects the popular will.

== Contents ==
The Fundamental Law is divided into sections and articles as outlined below.

Section and article(s)	Subject area(s)	Notes
National Avowal (preamble)		
Foundation		21 articles (A-U) specifying the country's name, capital, official language, symbols, etc.
Freedom and Responsibility		31 articles (I-XXXI) covering citizens' rights and duties
The State		54 articles covering the state's attributes
1-7	The National Assembly	
8	National Referendums	
9-14	The President of the Republic	
15-22	The Government	
23	Autonomous Regulatory Organs	
24	The Constitutional Court	
25-28	Courts	
29	The Prosecution Service	
30	The Commissioner for Fundamental Rights	
31-35	Local Governments	
36-44	Public Finances	
45	The Hungarian Defence Forces	
46	The Police and National Security Services	
47	Decisions on Participation in Military Operations	
48-54	Special Legal Orders	Provisions concerning state of national crisis, state of emergency, state of preventive defence, unexpected attack and state of danger
Closing and Miscellaneous Provisions		

=== Overview ===
Described as socially, fiscally, and traditionally conservative, the constitution initiates a number of changes. In an effort to push the public debt below 50% of gross domestic product (from above 80% at the time of adoption), the powers of the Constitutional Court on budget and tax matters are restricted until debt falls below 50%. The President is allowed to dissolve Parliament if a budget is not approved, and only companies with transparent activities and ownership structures are allowed to bid for government contracts. The powers of the head of the Hungarian National Bank are also limited, and the modification of tax and pension laws requires a two-thirds majority. The life of a fetus is protected from the moment of conception, and although the move is seen as opening the possibility for a future ban or restrictions on abortion, existing laws were unaffected. Same-sex couples may legally register their partnerships, but marriage is defined as being between one man and one woman. A ban on discrimination does not mention age or sexual orientation, and the constitution allows life imprisonment for violent crimes without the possibility of parole.

The constitution lowers judges' mandatory retirement age from 70 to the general retirement age, which was 62 at the time of adoption and was set to rise to 65 by 2022. The provision also covers prosecutors but exempts the Prosecutor General and the head of Hungary's highest court, the Curia. The country's name is changed from "Hungarian Republic" to "Hungary" but the country remains a republic. The preamble of the constitution asserts the constitution's role as the basis of Hungary's legal order, and contains references to the Holy Crown, God, Christianity, the fatherland and traditional family values. Laws affecting areas such as family policy, the pension system and taxation can be altered only through special legislation (cardinal acts) passed by a two-thirds majority of Parliament and are not subject to constitutional review.

Gábor Halmai and Zoltán Szente, researchers of comparative constitutional law, claimed that the constitution was adopted without sufficient input from the opposition and society at large, that it curtails and politicizes previously independent institutions, and that it is designed to enshrine the rule of the Fidesz government. The lowering of judges' mandatory retirement age allowed the government to appoint hundreds of new judges across the judicial system. Zsolt Körtvélyesi, another expert on comparative constitutional law, criticized its preamble for including ethnic elements in the identity of Hungarians, thereby leaving Hungarian citizens belonging to ethnic minorities in an ambiguous position.

== History ==
=== Background ===
For centuries, the Hungarian constitution was unwritten, based upon customary law. There was no civil code either; lawyers worked with the Corpus Iuris Hungarici. Among the laws that acquired constitutional force were a series of liberal statutes enacted during the 1848 Revolution; Statute XII of 1867 (enacting the Ausgleich); and further guarantees for constitutionalism, such as Statute IV of 1869, separating the executive and the judiciary; or the post-1870 statutes regulating local self-government and state administration.

Following the advent of the Hungarian Soviet Republic, the Revolutionary Governing Council adopted a Provisional Constitution on 2 April 1919, providing for a Soviet-style political system. On 23 June, the National Assembly of Allied Councils adopted Hungary's first charter-like constitution, the Constitution of the Socialist Allied Council Republic of Hungary. However, that regime was crushed two months later and Hungary returned to its historical, unwritten pre-1918 constitution.

Despite the lack of a written constitution, several constitutional laws were passed during the interwar period of the Kingdom of Hungary. Statute I of 1920 confirmed the monarchical form of government (albeit with a vacant throne, the king's powers being exercised by regent Miklós Horthy and his ministers) and vested legislative power in the diet. Statute XLVII dethroned the Habsburg-Lorraine dynasty. A second chamber was established by Statute XXII of 1926. Successive constitutional acts increased the power of the regent, who was empowered to nominate forty senators at first, and during World War II, eighty-seven.

=== 1949 Constitution ===
In August 1949, with the Hungarian Working People's Party in complete control of the country, a constitution based on the 1936 Soviet Constitution was enacted, the party's leading role enshrined in the document. Its basic features remained in place until 1989, although a number of important amendments were made, including one in 1972 that proclaimed Hungary a socialist state. While the constitution guaranteed certain fundamental rights, their scope was limited by provisions stating they had to be exercised in harmony with the interests of the socialist society.

In 1989, as the Communist regime ended, the legislature overwhelmingly approved nearly a hundred changes to the constitution that purged the document's Communist character. Hungary was thus defined as a civil democratic and constitutional republic that respected "the values of both bourgeois democracy and democratic socialism". After the opposition won free elections in the 1990 Hungarian parliamentary election, references to democratic socialism and the planned economy were dropped. Further modifications followed over the ensuing two decades, as successive plans for a new constitution did not reach fulfillment.

=== 2011 Fundamental Law ===
==== Drafting process ====
In 2010, a new government led by Fidesz initiated a drafting process for a new constitution. A parliamentary committee for drafting the constitution was set up, with all five parliamentary parties represented; the draft was composed on the iPad of József Szájer, then a member of the European Parliament. The following February, a body responsible for national consultations on a draft was set up by Szájer; its members included János Csák, Hungarian ambassador to the United Kingdom; Zsigmond Járai, chairman of the supervisory board of the National Bank; József Pálinkás, president of the Hungarian Academy of Sciences and former Minister of Education; and Katalin Szili, former Hungarian Socialist Party Speaker of the National Assembly. The consultation involved questionnaires being mailed out to all citizens for their opinions; some 917,000 or 11% were returned. Provisions were then included or excluded based on consensus among respondents; for instance, a proposal to adopt voting rights for minors was shelved after citizens expressed disapproval.

The following April 18, Parliament approved the constitution by the required two-thirds majority, on a 262–44 vote, with Fidesz and their Christian Democrat coalition partners in favor and Jobbik opposed. The Hungarian Socialist Party and Politics Can Be Different (LMP), citing the ruling party's unwillingness to compromise on issues and their inability to change the outcome, boycotted both the drafting process and the vote. On April 25, President Pál Schmitt signed the document into law, and it entered into force on the first day of 2012. The enactment came halfway through Hungary's six-month presidency of the Council of the European Union (EU).

==== Domestic reactions and subsequent developments ====
According to Fidesz parliamentary group chairman János Lázár, the constitution marks a break with Hungary's Communist past, while Prime Minister Viktor Orbán said it completes a transition to democracy and allows for sound finances and clean government after years of mismanagement and scandals; however, the opposition accused Fidesz of using its two-thirds majority in Parliament to push through its own constitution without cross-party consensus. Prior to and during the vote to adopt the constitution, thousands of protesters demonstrated in Budapest against its adoption; among their complaints are that it is an attempt by the government to cement its power beyond its term, force its Christian ideology on the country and limit civil liberties. Lack of opposition participation was also mentioned, but Deputy Prime Minister Tibor Navracsics responded that other parties were invited to participate but refused. Members of the Hungarian business community mentioned possible future difficulties in adopting the euro, noting a provision that enshrines the forint as legal tender. However, a government official said that, if the two-thirds majority to change this provision could not be attained, it could be circumvented by other means, such as a referendum.

One section of the preamble criticized by some historians as well as by the head of Hungary's Jewish community is the statement that the country lost its independence when it was invaded and occupied by Nazi Germany in March 1944. They asserted that the provision implies the state was not responsible for the ensuing deportation of Jews to extermination camps as part of the Holocaust and that it could affect future restitution claims. Historian Géza Jeszenszky strongly rejected criticism of the passage, saying the loss of Hungarian sovereignty in March 1944 due to foreign invasion is simply a historical fact that should not be denied. In its support, he also mentioned Germany's direct intervention into Hungarian politics, such as the arrest of cabinet members and of anti-German politicians. Socialist leader Attila Mesterházy denounced what he called "Fidesz's party constitution" and promised to change the constitution "on the basis of a national consensus" following the next elections. László Sólyom, former President of Hungary and of the Constitutional Court, is a critic of limits imposed on the court and of the "common parliamentary wrangling" through which the charter was adopted.

The day after New Year's Day 2012, the government held a gala celebration at the Hungarian State Opera House to mark the entry into force of the constitution. Outside on Andrássy út, tens of thousands of people protested the occasion, with opponents claiming the constitution threatens democracy by removing checks and balances. Demonstrators included representatives from various civil groups and opposition parties, among them the Socialists. Fidesz MP Gergely Gulyás, who helped write the constitution, responded to critics by saying that it improves the legal framework of life in Hungary.

==== International reactions ====
The Venice Commission and the Hungarian Helsinki Committee expressed concern over the provision on cardinal acts; opposition parties said these could bind future governments to Fidesz' actions, but did promise to participate in the debate on the acts. Amnesty International believes the document "violates international and European human rights standards", citing the clauses on fetal protection, marriage and life imprisonment, and sexual orientation not being covered in the anti-discrimination clause. Left-wing and liberal members of the European Parliament said that it fails to protect citizens' rights and reduces legislative checks and balances. Among these was Guy Verhofstadt, head of the Alliance of Liberals and Democrats for Europe, who said the constitution could limit "fundamental human rights" and was adopted without transparency, flexibility, a spirit of compromise and sufficient time for debate. Werner Hoyer, Germany's deputy foreign minister, expressed his country's concern as well, prompting the Hungarian Foreign Affairs Ministry to dismiss the remarks as "inexplicable and unacceptable". Additionally, United Nations Secretary-General Ban Ki-moon suggested the government should address concerns about the constitution.

In neighboring Slovakia, which has a significant Hungarian minority, at least three parties, including the governing Slovak Democratic and Christian Union – Democratic Party, expressed concern about clauses that afford certain rights to ethnic Hungarians abroad, including the right to dual citizenship and the right to vote, and critics there fear that the move has expansive and nationalist objectives. Slovakia's Foreign Affairs Ministry stated that it would oppose any other country's infringement of the Slovak Constitution, its sovereignty or the rights of its citizens. In response, Foreign Minister János Martonyi assured his Slovak counterpart that the constitution has no extraterritorial effect.

=== Amendments ===
==== 2012–2025: Fidesz governments ====
In March 2013, Parliament amended the constitution for the fourth time, on a 265-11 vote, with Fidesz, the Christian Democrats and three independents in favor and the Socialists boycotting the vote; there were also 33 abstentions. Subsequently, President János Áder signed the amendment into law, citing his legal duty and the need to preserve national unity. The fifteen-page amendment touches on several aspects. It annuls rulings of the Constitutional Court made before the Fundamental Law went into force, while allowing their legal effects to remain. It endows the president of the Curia and the chief prosecutor with the power to initiate constitutional review of laws. While giving the Constitutional Court the power to review the constitution itself on procedural grounds, it stipulates that the court cannot annul a law passed by a two-thirds parliamentary majority. Judges and prosecutors are obliged to retire at the general retirement age, although that age is left unstated; the Curia head and the chief prosecutor are exempt. The amendment enshrines freedom of religion and allows constitutional complaints regarding the church law. It allows civil lawsuits for hate speech targeting an individual's community, and declares that communism is condemned. The measure requires students whose education is subsidized by the state to work in Hungary for a period after graduation or reimburse their tuition costs to the state. It allows only public media to air political advertising prior to general and European elections. The importance of the traditional family is stressed, and authorities are empowered to ban living in certain public spaces, although homelessness is not outlawed. A prior proposal on requiring voters to register prior to elections was not included after being earlier voided by the Constitutional Court.

The amendment drew criticism both within Hungary and abroad. The Socialist floor leader called the measure an attempt to restrict the Constitutional Court's powers, and party members hung black flags from the Hungarian Parliament Building's windows, in sign of mourning for democracy. The LMP said that the government was "dismantling constitutional values", while former prime minister Ferenc Gyurcsány, head of the small Democratic Coalition, also drew attention to the diminution in the court's prerogatives. A protest in Budapest held in the days before parliamentary approval was given drew several thousands, while on the day of the vote, a few hundred turned out. Both José Manuel Barroso (the president of the European Commission) and Thorbjørn Jagland (the Secretary General of the Council of Europe) raised concerns about the amendment's impact on the rule of law, and prominent EU politicians, including Verhofstadt and Martin Schulz, expressed more forceful criticism. Orbán denied that the powers of the Constitutional Court had been curtailed, challenging critics to explain just how the amendment is undemocratic, while his party said that the measure was needed in order to delineate the new constitution from the previous one.

That September, a fifth amendment was passed in response to recommendations from the Constitutional Court, the European Commission, and the Venice Commission. Approved by Fidesz parliamentarians, it was opposed by LMP and the Socialists, while Jobbik abstained. The provision granted the National Bank oversight of financial markets; eliminated a provision allowing judicial cases to be transferred from one court to another, as well as one allowing taxes to be raised for financing fines charged to the Hungarian state by international court rulings; clarified the recognition of religious communities and allowed political campaign ads to be aired on public as well as commercial television and radio free of charge. Following the amendment's adoption, Jagland praised government efforts to address international criticism.

A 2020 amendment defined the family as the union of a father who is a man and a mother who is a woman. A 2025 amendment, the 15th adopted, declares that all Hungarians are either male or female, allows the government to strip dual nationals of their Hungarian citizenship if they are declared dangerous to the nation and enshrines the right to use cash. The amendment was denounced by liberal critics.

==== 2026–present: Tisza government ====
After the 2026 change of government, the Tisza Party's supermajority adopted the sixteenth amendment on 15 June 2026; Fidesz–KDNP voted against, while Our Homeland Movement abstained. In line with Péter Magyar's election campaign promises, the amendment limits the prime minister's time in office to two four-year terms, counting from 1990. The amendment removed the requirement for an agency protecting the country's "constitutional identity", therefore providing the constitutional basis for the dissolution of the Orbán-created Sovereignty Protection Office. Furthermore, the amendment included changes for public trust foundations (kekva) set up under Orbán through the transfer of state assets; Magyar's government pledged to return their assets to the state or cut funding to them, such as in the case of the Fidesz-affiliated Mathias Corvinus Collegium. Fidesz MPs condemned the amendment as tailor-made legislation, "Lex Orbán", since the only person the term limit affected at the time of adoption was Orbán. They noted that the prime minister is not term-limited in any parliamentary democracy in Europe. Fidesz considered this clause to be retroactive legislation, but experts disputed this, stating that it only applies to the future. The proposal received further criticism, as it was submitted by MPs and not the government, therefore avoiding public or professional consultation.

In June 2026, Magyar announced plans for the seventeenth amendment to the Fundamental Law, which he formally proposed on 4 July. The proposed amendment would terminate the mandate of President Tamás Sulyok upon entry into force, limit members of Parliament after 1990 to three four-year-terms, impose an age limit of 70 years on Constitutional Court judges, empower the Constitutional Court and Curia to elect or recall their own presidents, strengthen the Court's powers to review certain budgetary and tax cases, reduce the scope of the cardinal acts, deprive the Fiscal Council of its budgetary veto, strengthen the protection of public funds, and provide a constitutional basis for the planned National Asset Recovery and Protection Office to investigate and recover public assets misappropriated during the Orbán era. Alongside President Sulyok, the amendment would force Constitutional Court President Péter Polt and several other judges out of office, all of whom were appointed by the previous Fidesz parliamentary majority. During the election campaign and transition of power, Magyar had repeatedly called on Sulyok, Polt, and other top officials to resign, describing them as "puppets" who aided and abetted the "dismantling the rule of law ‌and democracy". He pledged to remove them from office by constitutional amendment if this did not happen, pending a significant overhaul of the constitution.

The National Assembly adopted the seventeenth amendment on 13 July 2026 by a vote of 139 votes to 6; Tisza in favor, Our Homeland against, and Fidesz–KDNP boycotting the vote. Sulyok signed the amendment, removing himself from office on 20 July 2026 and triggering an early presidential election.
