= President of Hungary =

Head of state

President of the Republic of Hungary
- Magyarország köztársasági elnöke
- Coat of arms of the president

- Standard of the president

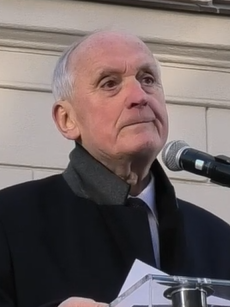
- Incumbent; András Baka since 19 August 2026
- Status: Head of state Commander-in-chief
- Residence: Sándor Palace
- Appointer: National Assembly
- Term length: Five years, renewable once
- Constituting instrument: Constitution of Hungary (2012)
- Precursor: Regent of Hungary (1st) Presidential Council of Hungary (2nd)
- Formation: 11 January 1919; 107 years ago (1st) 1 February 1946 (2nd) 23 October 1989 (current)
- First holder: Mihály Károlyi (First Republic, 1919) Zoltán Tildy (Second Republic, 1946) Árpád Göncz (Third Republic, 1990)
- Abolished: 29 February 1920 (1st) 20 August 1949 (2nd)
- Deputy: Speaker of the National Assembly
- Salary: 3,909,710 Ft monthly
- Website: www.sandorpalota.hu

The president of Hungary, officially the president of the republic (Note: Under the Basic Law, adopted in 2011, the official name of the state is simply Hungary as opposed to the former name "Hungarian Republic", but the form of government is still a republic and the office is referred to as the president of the republic, though in a sense of "the president of the republic that presides over Hungary", rather than "the president who presides over the Republic of Hungary".) (Hungarian: Magyarország köztársasági elnöke [ˈmɒɟɒrorsaːɡ ˈkøstaːrʃɒʃaːɡi ˈɛlnøkɛ], államelnök, or államfő [ˈaːlːɒɱføː]), is the head of state of Hungary and serves as the commander-in-chief of the Hungarian Defence Force. The office has a largely ceremonial (figurehead) role, but may also veto legislation or send legislation to the Constitutional Court for review. Most other executive powers, such as selecting government ministers and leading legislative initiatives, are vested in the office of the prime minister instead.

== Presidential election ==
The Constitution of Hungary provides that the National Assembly (Országgyűlés) elects the president of Hungary for a term of five years. Presidents have a term limit of two terms of office.

=== Independence of the function ===
According to Article 12 (2) of the Constitution, the president, when exercising their function, cannot exercise "a public, political, economic or social function or mission". They may not engage in "any other paid professional activity, and may not receive remuneration for any other activity, other than activities subject to copyright".

=== Condition for the candidature ===
According to Article 10 (2), any Hungarian citizen aged at least 35 years old may be elected as president.

=== Electoral process ===
Called by the president of the National Assembly, the presidential election must be held between 30 and 60 days before the end of the term of the incumbent president, or within 30 days if the office is vacated.

The Constitution states that candidatures must be "proposed in writing by at least one fifth of the members of the National Assembly". They shall be submitted to the president of the National Assembly before the vote. A member of the National Assembly may nominate only one candidate.

The secret ballot must be completed within two consecutive days at the most. In the first round, if one of the candidates obtains more than 2/3 of the votes of all the members of the National Assembly, the candidate is elected.

If no candidate obtains the required majority, the second round is organized between the two candidates who obtained the most votes in the first round. The candidate obtaining the majority of the votes cast in the second round shall be elected president. If the second round is unsuccessful, a new election must be held after new candidatures are submitted.

=== Oath of office ===
According to Article 11 (6), the president of the republic must take an oath before the National Assembly.

The oath is as follows:

Én, [name of the person] fogadom, hogy Magyarországhoz és annak Alaptörvényéhez hű leszek, jogszabályait megtartom és másokkal is megtartatom; köztársasági elnöki tisztségemet a magyar nemzet javára gyakorolom. [And, according to the conviction of the one who takes the oath] Isten engem úgy segéljen!

I [name of the person], swear to be faithful to Hungary and its Basic Law, to respect and enforce its legislation by others; I shall exercise my function as the president of the Republic for the good of the Hungarian nation. [And, according to the conviction of the one who takes the oath] May God help me so!

== Competencies and prerogatives ==
According to the Basic Law, "the Head of State of Hungary is the President of the Republic who expresses the unity of the nation and oversees the democratic functioning of State institutions". The President is the Commander-in-Chief of the Hungarian Defence Forces, "represents Hungary", "may participate in the sittings of the National Assembly and take the floor", and can "initiate laws" or a national referendum. The President determines the date of elections, participates in "decisions concerning particular states of law" (state of war, emergency...), convokes the National Assembly after the elections, can dissolve it, and can check the conformity of a law by the Constitutional Court.

The head of state "proposes the names of the Prime Minister, the President of the Curia, the Principal Public Prosecutor and the Commissioner of Fundamental Rights", is the sole nominator of judges and the President of the Budget Council. With the "countersignature of a member of the government", the head of state appoints the ministers, the governor of the National Bank of Hungary, the heads of independent regulatory entities, university professors, generals, mandates ambassadors and university rectors, and "awards decorations, rewards and titles". However, the president can refuse to make these appointments "if the statutory conditions are not fulfilled or if it concludes for a well-founded reason that there would be a serious disturbance to the democratic functioning of the State institutions".

Also with the agreement of the government, the head of state "exercises the right of individual pardon", "decides matters of organization of territory" and "cases concerning the acquisition and deprivation of citizenship".

== Immunity and removal from office ==
According to Article 12 of the Basic Law, "the President of the Republic is inviolable". Consequently, all criminal proceedings against the president can only take place after the end of their mandate.

However, Article 13 (2) of the Constitution provides for the removal of the president. This can only take place if the president "intentionally violates the Basic Law or another law in the performance of duties, or if they commit an offense voluntarily". In such a case, the motion for removal should be proposed by at least 1/5 of the members of the National Assembly.

The indictment procedure is initiated by a decision taken by secret ballot by a supermajority of 2/3 of the members of the National Assembly. Subsequently, in proceedings before the Constitutional Court, it is determined whether the president should be relieved of their duties.

If the court establishes the responsibility of the president, the president shall be removed from office.

== Succession ==
=== Termination of mandate and incapacity ===
According to Article 12 (3), the term of office of the president of the republic ends:

- When the term of office is completed;
- By the death of the President while in office;
- By an incapacity which renders impossible the performance of their duties for more than 90 days;
- If they no longer meet the conditions for being eligible;
- A declaration of incompatibility of duties;
- By resignation;
- By dismissal.

According to Article 12 (4), the National Assembly must decide by a majority of 2/3 of all its members to decide the incapacity of the president of the republic to exercise their responsibilities for more than 90 days.

=== Absence (temporary incapacity) ===
According to Article 14 (1), if the president of the republic is temporarily incapable of exercising their functions and powers, these are exercised by the speaker of the National Assembly of Hungary, who can not delegate them to deputies and who is replaced in National Assembly duties by one of the deputy speakers of the National Assembly until the end of the president's incapacity.

According to Article 14 (2), the temporary incapacity of the president of the republic is decided by the National Assembly on the proposal of the president themselves, the government, or a member of the National Assembly.

=== The 17th amendment to the Hungarian Fundamental Law in July 2026 ===
In July 2026, the National Assembly adopted the 17th amendment to the Fundamental Law, which, among other things, terminates the mandate of Tamás Sulyok as President of the Republic. The former prime minister, Viktor Orbán, commented that he would not consider the decisions of the newly elected president to be legal. Sulyok signed the amendment, leading to the termination of his mandate on 20 July 2026.

== History ==
=== Role in the legislative process ===
The role of the President of the Republic in the legislative process: Numbers of vetoes etc
President	Term	Self-proposed laws	Political vetoes	Constitutional vetoes	All
Árpád Göncz	1990–1995	3	0	7	10
Árpád Göncz	1995–2000	0	2	1	3
Ferenc Mádl	2000–2005	0	6	13	19
László Sólyom	2005–2010	0	31	16	47
Pál Schmitt	2010–2012	0	0	0	0
János Áder	2012–2017	0	28	5	33
János Áder	2017–2022	0	9	3	12
Katalin Novák	2022–2024	0	3	2	5
Tamás Sulyok	2024–2026	0	3	0	3
Total		3	82	47	132

== Latest election ==
Candidate	Party	Votes	%
András Baka	Independent	140	95.89
Against		6	4.11
Total		146	100.00
Valid votes		146	100.00
Invalid/blank votes		0	0.00
Total votes		146	100.00
Registered voters/turnout		199	73.37

== See also ==
- List of heads of state of Hungary
- Fundamental Law of Hungary
