= Curia of Hungary =

Highest court of Hungary

- Kúria
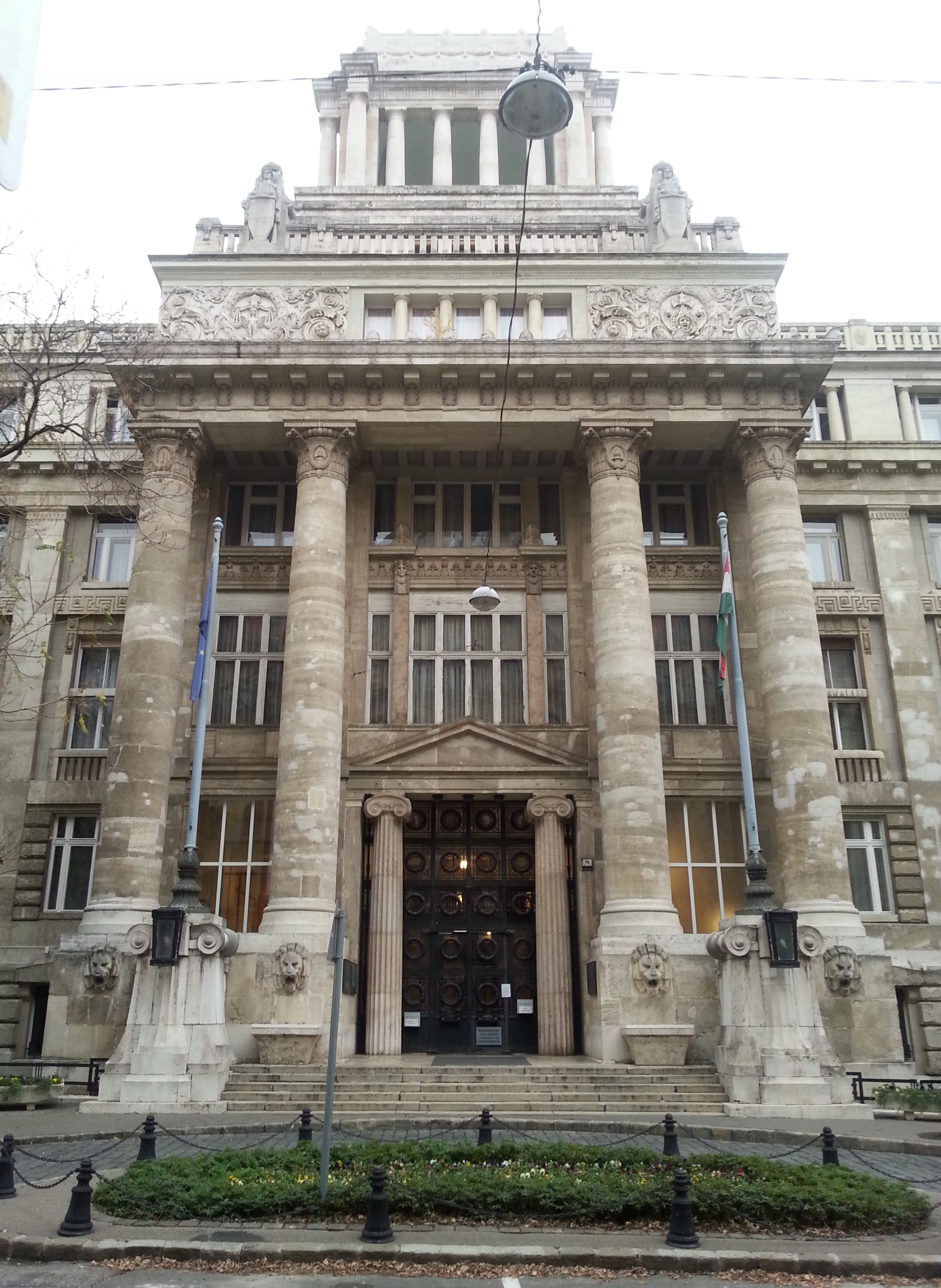
- Interactive map of Curia of Hungary
- Established: 1949; 77 years ago
- Location: Budapest
- Authorised by: Constitution of Hungary
- Website: kuria-birosag.hu/en

President
- Currently: András Zsolt Varga
- Since: 2021

The Curia (Hungarian: Kúria, pronounced [ˈkuːrijɒ]), also known as the Supreme Court (Legfelsőbb Bíróság) before 2011, is the supreme court and highest judicial authority of Hungary. The Curia was founded in 1949 as the Supreme Court of the Hungarian People's Republic. It was preceded by the Royal Curia of Hungary. The current president of the court is András Zsolt Varga.

== Presidents ==
=== Supreme court (1949–2012) ===
- Ödön Somogyi (1949–1950)
- Péter Jankó (1950–1953)
- Erik Molnár (1953–1954)
- József Domokos (1954–1958)
- Mihály Jahner-Bakos (1958–1963)
- József Szalay (1963–1968)
- Ödön Szakács (1968–1980)
- Jenő Szilbereky (1980–1990)
- Pál Solt (1990–2002)
- Zoltán Lomnici (2002–2008)
- András Baka (2009–2011)

=== Curia (2012–present) ===
- Péter Darák (2012–2021)
- András Zsolt Varga (2021–present)

== See also ==
- Constitutional Court of Hungary
