= 2022 in Hungary =

- Decades: 2000s; 2010s; 2020s; 2030s
- See also: Other events of 2022; List of years in Hungary

Events in the year 2022 in Hungary.

== Incumbents ==
Incumbents
Position	Person	Party	Notes
President	János Áder	Fidesz	until 10 May
President	Katalin Novák	Fidesz	from 10 May
Prime Minister	Viktor Orbán	Fidesz	
Speaker of the National Assembly	László Kövér	Fidesz	

== Elections ==
2022 Hungarian parliamentary election 3 April 2022
Party	Leader
Popular vote
Fidesz–KDNP Viktor Orbán		54.13%
EM Péter Márki-Zay		34.44%
MHM László Toroczkai		5.88%
MNOÖ Imre Ritter		0.44%
Others		5.11%
Seats
Fidesz–KDNP		135
EM		57
MHM		6
MNOÖ		1

2022 Hungarian presidential election
Ballot →	10 March 2022
Required majority →	133 out of 199
Katalin Novák (Fidesz) Nominations: Fidesz–KDNP	137 / 199
Péter Róna (Ind.) Nominations: United for Hungary	51 / 199
Invalid	5 / 199
Absent	6 / 199

== Events ==
Ongoing — COVID-19 pandemic in Hungary

=== January ===
- 12 January – Price caps announced for seven consumer products, effective 1 February. The price of granulated sugar, fine wheat flour, sunflower cooking oil, pork leg, chicken breast, back, and 2.8% UHT milk is fixed at the 15 October 2021 price. Originally announced until 1 May, the measure would be continually extended.

=== February ===
- 16 February – The European Court of Justice dismisses Poland and Hungary's challenges against the regulation and confirms that the regulation is in compliance with the treaties of the European Union. This will allow the European Commission to suspend funds from the EU budget to member states that have rule of law issues which are likely to affect the management of EU funds.

=== March ===
- 7 March – Hungarian Prime Minister Viktor Orbán signs a decree allowing the deployment of NATO troops in western Hungary, and the transfer of lethal weapons across its territory to other NATO member states. However, the decree does not allow weapons shipments across its territory to Ukraine.
- 10 March – 2022 Hungarian presidential election: The governing alliance, Fidesz-KDNP nominated presidential candidate Katalin Novák, the former minister for Family Affairs is elected, becoming the first-ever female president.
- 16 March – 2022 Hungarian teacher's strike
- 26 March – Results of the architectural design competition for the renovation of the Nyugati Railway Station announced
- 30 March – It is reported that Russian government hackers have attacked and compromised the servers of Hungary's Ministry of Foreign Affairs since late 2021.

=== April ===
- 3 April – Viktor Orbán's Fidesz–KDNP alliance, Wins the Hungarian 2022 elections in a 4 election in a row Landslide preserving its two-thirds majority which it has held since 2010. The opposition alliance United for Hungary makes loses, while The Far Right Nationalist Mi Hazánk party won seats for the first time.
- 5 April –
  - Five people are killed and ten others are injured when a train collides with a pickup truck in Mindszent.
  - The European Commission launches disciplinary proceedings against Hungary under the newly-upheld conditionality mechanism that could block funds over rule-of-law concerns if the shortcomings do not prevent misuse of EU funds.

=== May ===
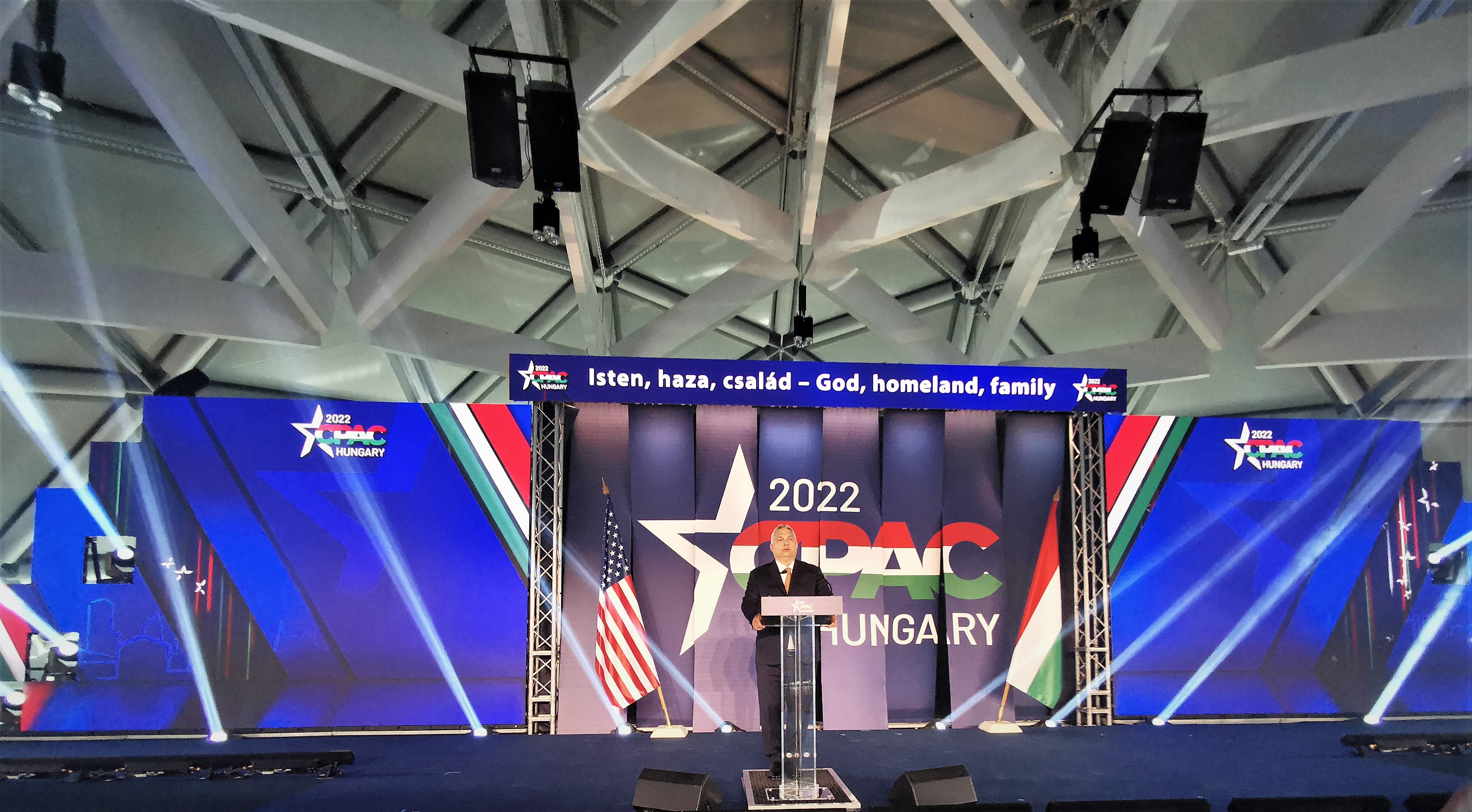
Viktor Orbán speaking at CPAC Hungary

- 1 May – Hungary, a member of the European Union, says that it will veto any sanctions that would restrict energy imports from Russia. Unanimity among the 27 EU members is required to introduce sanctions.
- 2 May – Ukraine's National Security and Defense Council Secretary Oleksiy Danilov accuses Hungary of having advance knowledge of the Russian invasion, saying that Hungary was warned by Russian President Vladimir Putin, and that Hungary had plans to annex parts of Western Ukraine.
- 10 May – Katalin Novák takes office as the first female President of Hungary.
- 8 May – János Volner announces he will rename his Volner Party to Huxit Party, to advocate the Hungarian exit from the EU. The official renaming did not yet occur.
- 14 May – Renovation of Metro Line 3: Semmelweis Klinikák, Corvin-negyed, and Kálvin tér stations open, Lehel tér, Nagyvárad tér and Dózsa György út stations close, the latter for the second time for the construction of accessibility infrastructure. With that, the last un-renovated stations close.
- 19 May – New World People's Party dissolved
- 19–20 May – A conservative conference billed by the organizers as CPAC Hungary was held in Budapest, Hungary. Speakers included Hungary's Prime Minister Viktor Orbán, Spain's Vox party leader Santiago Abascal, Eduardo Bolsonaro, right-wing US commentator Candace Owens, Ernst Roets the Deputy CEO of AfriForum, and former US White House chief of staff Mark Meadows, as well as far-right US conspiracy theorist Jack Posobiec and Hungarian journalist Zsolt Bayer. According to The Guardian, Bayer has previously "called Jews 'stinking excrement', referred to Roma as 'animals' and used racial epithets to describe Black people".
- 24 May – Hungary declares a state of emergency over the war in Ukraine and problems in the Hungarian economy caused in part by the conflict.

=== June ===
- 27 June – Four people are injured when an apartment roof collapses in Budapest.

=== July ===
- 12 July – Parliament passes Act XIII of 2022 on itemized tax of low-tax entrepreneurs (KATA) abolishing the KATA simplified tax type. The act is published in Magyar Közlöny on 18 July.
- 12-25 July – Protests against the abolishment of KATA.
- 23 July – Prime Minister Viktor Orbán in a speech in Romania, speaks against the “mixing” of European and non-European races, adding “We [Hungarians] are not a mixed race and we do not want to become a mixed race,”.
- 29 July - National Transportation Center (NKK) is dissolved.

=== September ===
- 5 September – A vehicle and train collision in Kunfehértó, Hungary, kills seven people and injures the train's driver.
- 15 September – Hungary pass new abortion restrictions, with a Mandatory ultrasounds bill. Where women who are seeking an abortion will now be obliged to “listen to the foetal heartbeat” before they can have an abortion. This Bill was pushed for by the far-right Mi Hazank (Our Homeland) party.
- 16 September – DK establishes its shadow government led by Klára Dobrev

=== October ===
- 23 October – Thousands of people, including teachers and students, protest across Hungary against the government of Viktor Orbán, demanding higher salaries and the right to strike amid a high level of inflation in the country.

=== November ===
- 10 November – Price caps expanded to chicken eggs and potato, at the 30 September 2022 price.
- 14 November – Upon the resignation of László Palkovics, his Ministry of Technology and Industry is dissolved. Its tasks are delegated to ministers Márton Nagy, János Lázár, János Csák, and Csaba Lantos.
- 19 November – The Integrity Authority is established, as part of the anti-corruption measures aimed at unlocking frozen EU funds.

=== December ===
- 6 December - End of price caps on petrol.
- 16 December - Széchenyi Chain Bridge is re-opened after 18 months of renovation, for BKK buses, taxis and cyclists only.
- 22 December - The European Commission announced it would hold back all 22 billion euros of EU cohesion funds for Hungary until its government meets conditions related to judiciary independence, academic freedoms, LGBTQI rights and the asylum system.

== Deaths ==
=== January ===
- 1 January – Gergely Homonnay, 46, Hungarian writer, journalist and LGBTQ activist.
- 4 January – Irma Mico, 107, Austro-Hungarian-born French resistance fighter.

=== February ===
- 2 February – Irén Pavlics, 87, Hungarian-Slovenian writer.
- 4 February – Tibor Bodnár, 66, Hungarian Olympic sports shooter (1976, 1980).
- 12 February –
  - Alexander Brody, 89, Hungarian-American businessman, author, and marketing executive.
  - Szabolcs Pásztor, 62, Olympic fencer.
- 17 February – Máté Fenyvesi, 88, footballer.
- 19 February – Gábor Vida, 92, Olympic figure skater.

=== March ===
- 4 March – Paula Marosi, 85, Olympic frencer.
- 6 March – Margit Korondi, 89, Gymnast.
- 7 March – István T. Horváth, 68, Hungarian American chemist.
- 31 March – Zoltán Friedmanszky, 87, football player.

=== April ===
- 6 April – Karol Divín, 86, Hungarian-born Slovak figure skater.
- 8 April – József Salim, 54, Olympic taekwondo practitioner.
- 11 April – Gábor Görgey, 92, writer and poet, minister of culture.
- 21 April – Iván Markó, 75, dancer and choreographer.

=== May ===
- 4 May – Géza Varasdi, 94, athlete, Olympic bronze medallist.
- 7 May – Maria Radnoti-Alföldi, 95, Hungarian-German archaeologist and numismatist.
- 16 May – Albin Molnár, 86, Olympic sailor.
- 22 May – József Duró, 55, football player.
- 25 May – Lívia Gyarmathy, 90, film director and screenwriter.
- 28 May – Péter Haumann, 81, actor.

=== June ===
- 1 June – István Szőke, 75, footballer.
- 4 June – György Moldova, 88, writer.
- 10 June – Zoltán Dörnyei, 62, Hungarian-born British linguist.
- 12 June – Robert O. Fisch, 97, Hungarian-born American pediatrician, artist, and author.
- 29 June – Miklós Szabó, 93, Olympic long-distance runner.

=== July ===
- 7 July – János Berecz, 91, politician, MP.
- 9 July – András Törőcsik, 67, footballer
- 20 July – Jolán Kleiber-Kontsek, 82, discus thrower
- 22 July – Stefan Soltész, 73, Hungarian-Austrian conductor
- 25 July – John Bienenstock, 85, Hungarian-born Canadian physician
- 28 July –
  - József Kardos, 62, footballer
  - Péter Szőke, 74, tennis player

=== August ===
- 9 August – Zoltán Halász, 62, Olympic cyclist
- 11 August – József Tóth, 70, footballer
- 15 August – András Várhelyi, 68, journalist and politician
- 18 August – István Liptay, 87, Olympic basketball player
- 22 August – György Pásztor, 99, Hall of Fame ice hockey player
- 27 August – Ferenc Stámusz, 88, Olympic racing cyclist

=== September ===
- 1 September – István Szalay, 78, mathematician and politician, MP
- 7 September – János Fuzik, 64, journalist and politician
- 14 September –
  - Géza Csapó, 71, canoeist.
  - Mária Wittner, 85, revolutionary and politician, MP
- 15 September – Tibor Frank, 74, historian.
- 17 September – Anna Thynn, Marchioness of Bath, 78, Hungarian-born British actress.
- 21 September – Andrea Molnár-Bodó, 88, gymnast
- 22 September – István Aranyos, 80, Olympic gymnast
- 23 September – Imre Koltai, 84, chemical engineer and politician, MP
- 27 September – Judah Samet, 84, Hungarian-American Holocaust survivor
- 29 September – Ildikó Szendrődi-Kővári, 92, Olympic alpine skier
- 30 September – József Horváth, 75, Olympic handball player

=== October ===
- 2 October – Béla Szakcsi Lakatos, 79, pianist and composer
- 26 October – Imre Forgács, 73, jurist, minister of justice
- 30 October – Miklós Lukáts, 76, politician, MP

=== November ===
- 7 November – Éva Szabó, 77, tennis player
- 14 November – Pál Révész, 88, mathematician
- 21 November – Kálmán Mészöly, 81, football player
- 25 November – Erzsébet Vasvári-Pongrátz, 68, Olympic sports shooter
- 27 November – Gábor Csapó, 72, water polo player

=== December ===
- 7 December – Ákos Kertész, 90, writer and screenwriter
- 9 December – Mihály Huszka, 89, Olympic weightlifter
- 10 December – Gabor Kalman, 92, Hungarian-American physicist
- 12 December – Iván Faragó, 76, chess grandmaster
- 14 December – Roch Kereszty, 89, Hungarian-American monk and scholar
- 21 December –
  - Lajos Koutny, 83, Olympic ice hockey player
  - György Tumpek, 93, swimmer, Olympic bronze medallist
- 23 December – József Fitos, 63, football player
- 27 December –
  - Imre Szöllősi, 81, sprint canoeist
  - Tibor Viniczai, 66, agricultural engineer and politician
- 29 December – János Varga, 83, wrestler

== See also ==
- List of Hungarian films since 1990
