= Gładysz (surname) =

Gładysz or Gladysz is a surname. Notable people with the surname include:

- John A. Gladysz (born 1952), American chemist
- Józef Gładysz (born 1952), Polish football coach
