= Hittner =

Hittner is a surname. Notable people with the surname include:

- David Hittner (born 1939), American judge
- Mark Hittner, American football official

== See also ==
- Wittner
