= 2022 Hungarian election =

The term 2022 Hungarian Election can be referring to the following

- 2022 Hungarian parliamentary election
- 2022 Hungarian presidential election
- 2022 Hungarian LGBTQ in education referendum
