= György Budaházy =

Hungarian politician

György Budaházy (born 3 June 1969) is a Hungarian nationalist and far-right activist.

== Education and early life ==
Budaházy was born in Budapest on 3 June 1969. His early years were spent in the Kelenföld housing estate. After graduating from the Antal Budai Nagy high school (Hungarian: Budai Nagy Antal Gimnázium), he studied mechanical engineering at the Budapest University of Technology. He graduated in 1992, but did not work as an engineer; instead, he studied at the Budapest Business School.

Around that time, he joined the center-right Hungarian Democratic Forum political party.

== Public life ==
He founded in 2006, together with László Toroczkai, the Hunnia organization. This organization rejects both the accession of Hungary to the European Union in 2004 and the Treaty of Trianon, and calls for a Greater Hungary with borders as they were before 1920.

Budaházy was known with his new organization by numerous acts of violence with Molotov cocktails. Budaházy was imprisoned in custody for various militant offenses since 2009. Budaházy was pardoned in April 2023 by the Hungarian president, Katalin Novák.

During the 2026 Hungarian parliamentary election he endorsed Fidesz in the constituencies and endorsed Our Homeland Movement on the party list.

== Family ==
In 1997, he married Bernadett Trencsányi, with whom he has three children (born 1999, 2001 and 2006). His younger sister Edda Budaházy is also a well-known right-wing activist.
