= Gergely Homonnay =

Hungarian writer and journalist (1969–2022)

Gergely Homonnay (24 August 1969 – 1 January 2022) was a Hungarian writer, journalist, teacher, author, human rights, political and LGBTQ activist.

== Life and career ==
Born in Gyula, Hungary, he studied English and German at the Faculty of Arts in the University of Szeged, then studied law in Pécs and the Faculty of Law at the Eötvös Loránd University. He worked as a translator for a photo agency, then as a journalist and blogger for years. He took a strong and unvarnished stance on political and social issues, and his three books written to show the world and politics through the eyes of his cat, Erzsi – published between 2016 and 2018 – made him and his sharp opinion widely known among Hungarian readers. Homonnay often raised his voice for socially deprived groups and animal welfare, and – according to his and Erzsi cat's social media pages – ran numerous fundraising campaigns to support domestic and international NGOs as well as individuals in need. He turned up in public life as one of the organisers and speakers of the anti-government demonstration "Mi vagyunk a tobbseg! (We are the Majority!)" after the Hungarian elections in 2018, and thereafter attracted many of both followers and political enemies. He was condemned for libel, after calling presidential candidate Katalin Novák "dirty nazi scum".

== Death ==
At the time of his death he had already left Hungary, and had been living in Rome for more than a year. According to Italian articles published in the following days, he was found dead in a gay bar in Rome on New Year's Day in 2022. All that is known with certainty about the circumstances of his death, is that it is currently under investigation as a crime case.
