= Wittner =

Wittner is a surname. Notable people with the surname include:

- Lawrence S. Wittner (born 1941), American historian
- Mária Wittner (1937–2022), Hungarian revolutionary and politician
- Markus Wittner (born 1973), Austrian freestyle skier
- Meg Wittner (born 1950), American actress
