= John A. Gladysz =

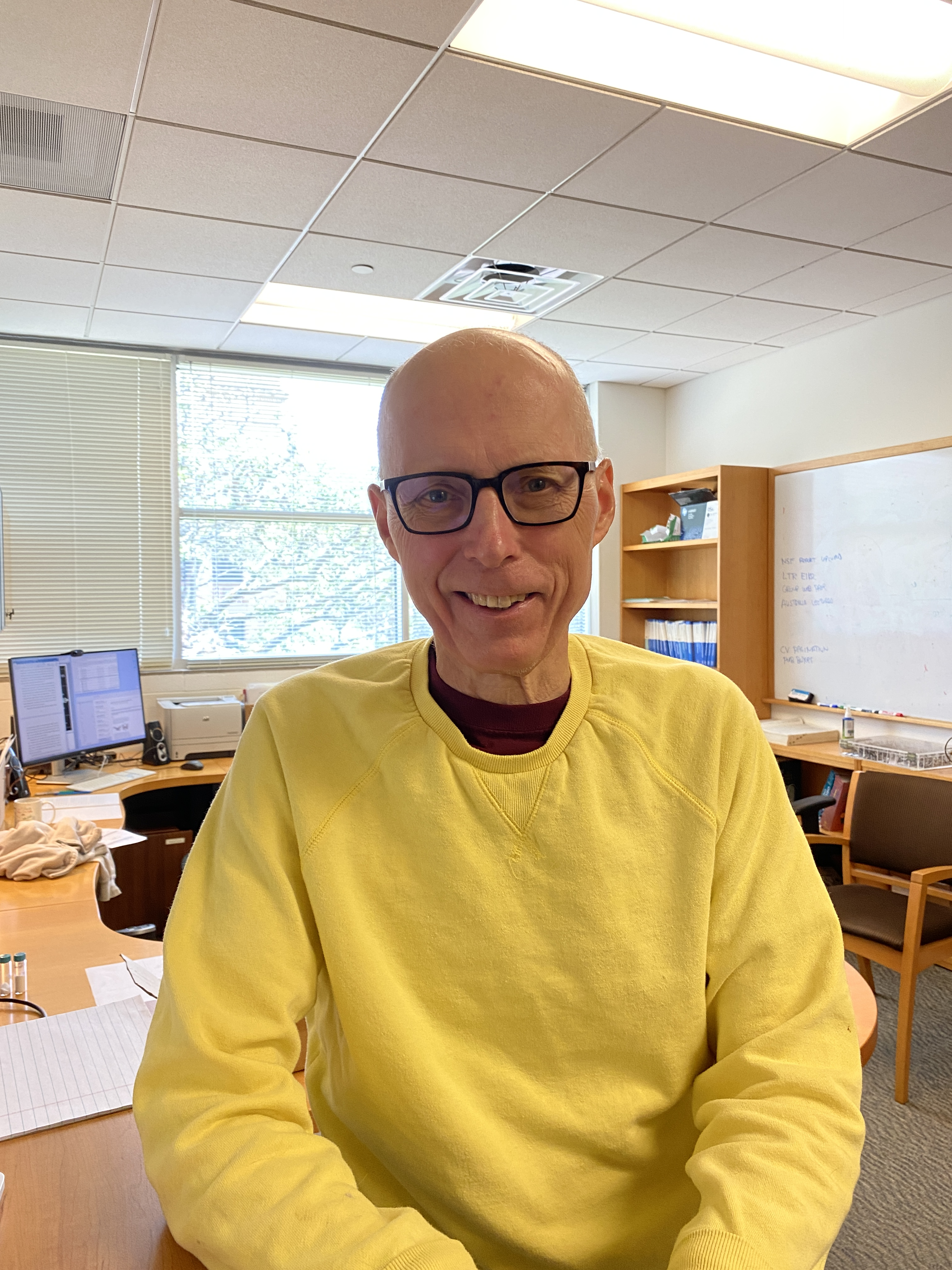
John A. Gladysz

John A. Gladysz, an organometallic chemist, is a Distinguished Professor and holds the Dow Chair in Chemical Invention at Texas A&M University. Professor Gladysz is a native of the Kalamazoo, Michigan area. He obtained his B.S. degree from the University of Michigan (1971) and his Ph.D. degree from Stanford University (1974). He subsequently held faculty positions at UCLA (1974-1982) and the University of Utah (1982-1998). He then accepted the Chair of Organic Chemistry at the University of Erlangen-Nuremberg in Germany. In 2008, he returned to North America as a distinguished professor and holder of the Dow Chair in Chemical Invention at Texas A&M University.

== Early life ==
Gladysz was born in Kalamazoo, Michigan, on August 13, 1952, and grew up in the small community of Galesburg between Kalamazoo and Battle Creek.

== Education ==
Gladysz completed four semesters at Western Michigan University. He then transferred to the University of Michigan, where during his first semester, he took honors organic chemistry from Prof. Daniel Longone. During the next semester, he began a research project involving cyclophanes. He then enrolled in or audited graduate courses and seminars. He continued research with Prof. Longone for two months after graduating (BS Chem) in April 1971, and then headed west to Stanford University, where he immediately joined the research group of Prof. E. E. van Tamelen

Prof. van Tamelen had a long-standing interest in nitrogen fixation, and Prof. Gladysz undertook two projects for his Ph.D. dissertation. One was directed at the mode of activation in nitrogenase, and entailed both molybdenum nitrogen complexes and iron/sulfur clusters; the other involved organic transformations mediated by titanium(II). These projects introduced him to working with air-sensitive compounds. He was also greatly influenced by a course on organometallic chemistry taught by James P. Collman. There was an extensive flow of expertise and ideas between the groups of Prof. Collman, Prof. Henry Taube, and Prof. Eugene van Tamelen at Stanford, and this stimulating atmosphere played a major role in the development of Prof. Gladysz's future research on the organic/inorganic interface.

== Professional career ==
When Gladysz began as an assistant professor at UCLA on July 1, 1974, he was, at least for the next six weeks, 21 years of age. This early start, coupled with the active program of seminar visitors at UCLA, allowed him to get to know many organic and inorganic chemists who began their careers shortly after the Second World War. Although he developed interests in metal atom chemistry and hydride reagents for organic synthesis, he made his early reputation in C_{1} chemistry – specifically the chemistry of metal formyl (-CHO), hydroxymethyl (-CH_{2}OH), formaldehyde (H_{2}C=O), and methylidene (=CH_{2}) complexes, as well as related species that were rare at that time (and believed to be intermediates in catalytic CO/H_{2} chemistry).

While at UCLA, Gladysz was named a fellow of the Alfred P. Sloan Foundation (1980) and a recipient of Camille and Henry Dreyfus Teacher-Scholar Grant (1980). In July 1982, he relocated to the University of Utah, where his research expanded to include organometallic stereochemistry and applications in enantioselective organic synthesis. While there, he received an Arthur C. Cope Scholar Award (1988), the University of Utah Distinguished Research Award (1992), and a Humboldt Foundation Research Award for Senior Scientists (1995-1996). In conjunction with the latter, he spent six months at the University of Marburg, and then a final month at the Technical University of Munich.

In the course of the Humboldt sponsored sabbatical, Prof. Gladysz gave a seminar at the ETH Zurich. His hosts invited the seminar speaker scheduled for the next day, Prof. Janet Bluemel (Technical University of Munich), to the customary dinner (Nachsitzung). This introduction led to a variety of interactions during his subsequent stay in Munich. These in turn led to their marriage on December 28, 1997, in Salt Lake City. Prof. Gladysz subsequently assumed the Chair of Organic Chemistry at the University of Erlangen-Nuremberg, where he succeeded Paul von Rague Schleyer, on April 1, 1998; Prof. Bluemel assumed a professorship on the same day at the University of Heidelberg.

During his period in Germany, Gladysz was able to greatly expand his programs dealing with molecular wires and fluorous chemistry begun at Utah. István T. Horváth, then working at ExxonMobil's Corporate Research Laboratories was a frequent collaborator on the latter project. Prof. Gladysz established a number of novel ring-closing metatheses in metal coordination spheres, the most interesting of which afforded a class of compounds that can be regarded as "molecular gyroscopes". Prof. Gladysz enjoyed all levels of the German and European scientific scenes and received the International Fluorous Technologies Award in 2007. However, he and Prof. Bluemel sought to optimize their personal and professional lives with appointments at the same University.

This goal was realized during 2007-2008 when Bluemel and Gladysz relocated to Texas A&M University. Prof. Gladysz was appointed as the Dow Chair in Chemical Invention and Distinguished Professor of Chemistry. He was furthermore elected as a Fellow of the American Chemical Society in the inaugural year, 2009, and a Fellow of the Royal Society of Chemistry in 2013. Prof. Gladysz' research at Texas A&M has continued to prominently feature catalysis (phase transfer catalyst activation; Werner complexes as chiral hydrogen bond donor catalysts), and expanded into container molecules that "turn themselves inside out". He received the Texas A&M Distinguished Achievement Award in Research, and the Royal Society of Chemistry Award in Organometallic Chemistry, both in 2013.

In 2017, Prof. Gladysz and Prof. Bluemel were jointly awarded the Texas A&M Foundation Partners in Philanthropy Faculty Award. They live on the Crow's Nest Ranch, which consists of 140 acres (60 hectares) 4 miles east of College Station.

== Research interests ==
Gladysz research centers around organometallic chemistry, and from this core branches into nanotechnology, stereochemistry, organic synthesis, enantioselective reactions, catalysis, mechanism, and materials chemistry. This work has been described in nearly 500 widely cited publications.

== Professional services and consulting ==
From June 1984 through July 2010, he was an associate editor of Chemical Reviews, where he and Editor-in-Chief Prof. Josef Michl introduced a number of innovative new features. He then succeeded Prof. Dietmar Seyferth as the editor in chief of Organometallics, a position he held until January 2015. As an author, Prof. Gladysz has published nearly 500 journal articles and book chapters with over 23,500 independent citations and an h-index of 80. These are augmented by nearly 100 Editorials, patents and patent applications, and book and meeting reviews.

=== Summary of consulting ===
- Gas Research Institute, Panel Member; New Directions, Chicago, Illinois, Basic Research on Coal Gasification,1979-1980
- G.D. Searle & Company, Consultant on Pharmaceutical Synthesis, Chicago, Illinois, High Pressure/Organometallic Methods,1980-1981
- Procter & Gamble Company, Consultant for Corporate Technology Cincinnati, Ohio, Division, Miami Valley Laboratory, 1983-1985
- Monsanto Corporation, Consultant for Polymer Products, Springfield Massachusetts Division, 1984-1986
- Union Camp Corporation, Consultant for Terpene Products, Princeton, New Jersey Division, 1988-1989
- Exxon Research & Engineering, Consultant for Corporate Research Annandale, New Jersey, Laboratories, 1993-1998
- Kimberly Clark Corporation, Consultant for New Technologies Roswell, Georgia Division, 1997-1998
- 3M Corporation, Consultant for Fluorocarbon Products, Minneapolis Minnesota Division, 1998-1999
- Rhodia (Rhône-Poulenc) Corporation, Consultant for Catalysis Division Lyon (Saint-Fons), France, 1999-2001
- Total/Fina/Elf, Consultant for Polyolefin Division, Paris, France Seneffe, Belgium, 2002-2005
- Edwards Nanoscience, Consultant for Oxidation Technologies Houston, Texas, 2009-2011
- Terrabon, Inc., Consultant for Biofuels Processing Bryan, Texas, 2011-2012

=== Summary of services ===
- Editor-in-chief, Organometallics, 2010-2014
- Associate editor, Chemical Reviews, 1984-2010
- Co-PI, NSF Organometallic Workshop, 1991-1993
- Member, NIH Medicinal Chemistry (A) Study Section, 1995-1999
- Chair, Organometallic Chemistry Gordon Conference, 1996
- Advisory Board Member, Max Planck Institute for Coal Research Mülheim, Germany, 1999-2005
- Editorial Board Member, New Journal of Chemistry, (2001-2012)
- Editorial Board Member, ACS Catalysis, (2011-2013)
- Chair, Scientific Advisory Board, Berlin Posdam Cluster of Excellence Unifiying Concepts in Catalysis (Unicat), 2014-2017
- Scientific Advisory Board, Unifying Systems in Catalysis/Einstein Center of Catalysis (UniSysCat/EC^{2}), 2019-2026
- Editorial Board Member, Journal of Organometallic Chemistry (2017- )

== Awards and honors ==
Gladysz professional awards & honors are listed below:

- Alfred P. Sloan Foundation Fellow, 1980-1984
- Camille and Henry Dreyfus Teacher-Scholar Award, 1980-1985
- Arthur C. Cope Scholar Award, 1988
- University of Utah Distinguished Research Award, 1992
- American Chemical Society Award in Organometallic Chemistry, 1994
- Humboldt Foundation Research Award for Senior Scientists, 1995-1996, 2018-2019, 2024-2025
- Who's Who in the World, 2002
- Lady Davis Professorship, Technion - Israel Institut of Technology, 2003-2004
- Fellow, American Association for the Advancement of Science, 2004
- International Fluorous Technologies Award, 2007
- Fellow of the American Chemical Society (inaugural 2009 class), 2009
- Texas A&M Distinguished Achievement Award in Research, 2013
- Royal Society of Chemistry Award in Organometallic Chemistry, 2013
- Fellow of the Royal Society of Chemistry, 2014
- Texas A&M Foundation Partners in Philanthropy Faculty Award, 2017
- Texas A&M College of Science Undergraduate Research Mentoring Award, 2020

== Named visiting professorships or lectureships ==
- Lady Davis Professorship, Technion – Israel Institute of Technology, 2003-2004
- Tarrant Visiting Professorship, University of Florida, 2009
- Kuivila Lecturer, State University of New York, Albany, 2011
- J. Clarence Karcher Lecturer, University of Oklahoma, 2011
- Bachmann Memorial Lecturer, University of Michigan, 2013
- Hans B. Jonassen Lecturer, Tulane University, 2020/2022
- R. Bruce King Lecturer, University of Georgia, 2023
- Seaborg Lecturer, Los Alamos National Laboratory, 2023
- SEC Lecturer, University of Mississippi, 2023

== Selected publications ==
- Homeomorphic Isomerization as a Design Element in Container Molecules; Binding, Displacement, and Selective Transport of MCl_{2} Species (M = Pt, Pd, Ni)", Kharel, S.; Jo-shi, H.; Bierschenk, S.; Stollenz, M.; Taher, D.; Bhuvanesh, N.; Gladysz, J. A. J. Am. Chem. Soc. 2017, 139, 2172-2175. DOI: 10.1021/jacs.6b12788.
- "Recycling and Delivery of Homogeneous Fluorous Rhodium Catalysts Using Poly(tetra-fluoroethylene); 'Catalyst-on-a-Tape'", Dinh, L. V.; Jurisch, M.; Fiedler, T.; Gladysz, J. A. ACS Sustainable Chemistry & Engineering 2017, 5, 10875-10888. DOI: 10.1021/ acssuschemeng.7b02770.
- "Monodisperse Molecular Models for the sp Carbon Allotrope Carbyne; Syntheses, Structures, and Properties of Diplatinum Polyynediyl Complexes with PtC_{20}Pt to PtC_{52}Pt Linkages", Arora, A.; Baksi, S. D.; Weisbach, N.; Amini, H.; Bhuvanesh, N.; Gladysz, J. A. ACS Central Science 2023, 9, 2225-2240. DOI: 10.1021/acscentsci. 3c01090.
- "Launching Werner Complexes into the Modern Era of Catalytic Enantioselective Organic Synthesis", Wegener, Aaron R.; Kabes, Connor Q.; Gladysz, J. A. Acc. Chem. Res. 2020, 53, 2299-2313.
- "Gyroscopes and the Chemical Literature, 2002–2020: Approaches to a Nascent Family of Molecular Devices", Ehnbom A.; Gladysz, J. A. Chem. Rev 2021, DOI: 10.1021/acs.chemrev.0c01001
