= Gabor Kalman =

American physicist (1929–2022)

Gabor J. Kalman
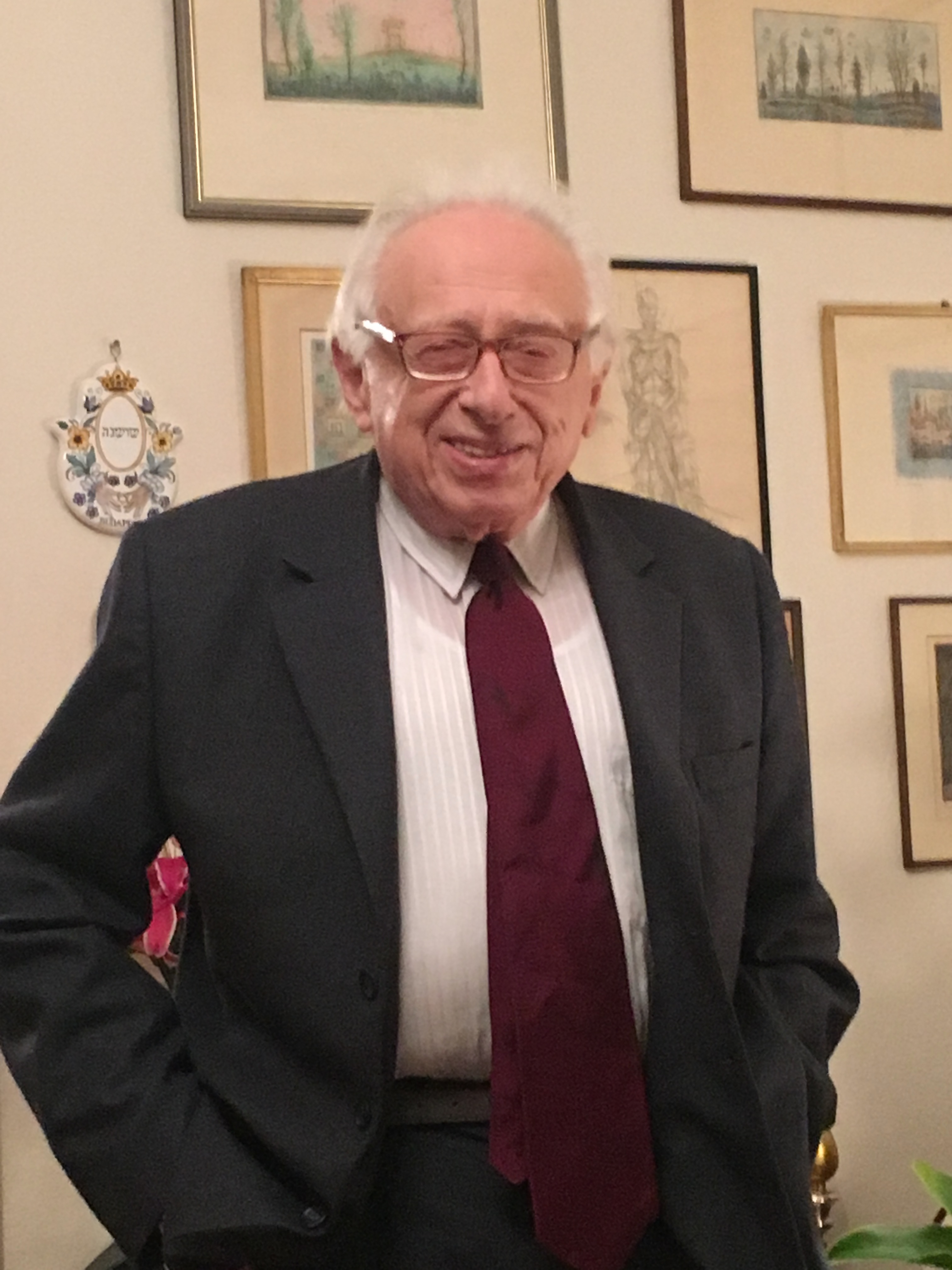
- Born: December 12, 1929
- Died: December 10, 2022 (aged 92)
- Occupations: Physicist, academic, and author

Academic background
- Education: Institute of Technology in Budapest; Technion-Israel Institute of Technology

Gabor J. Kalman (December 12, 1929 – December 10, 2022) was a Hungarian-American physicist, academic, and author. He was a Distinguished Research Professor Emeritus at Boston College.

Kalman lead research focused on strongly coupled Coulomb systems, such as plasmas, charged particle layered systems, bilayers, and fluctuation–dissipation theorems, along with other aspects of plasma physics. He has also done extensive work in relativistic many particle systems, through works on electron–positron plasmas, particle systems with scalar fields and astrophysical many-body systems. He was the principal creator of the research community around the conference series Strongly Coupled Coulomb Systems (SCCS) and served as editor to two books, entitled Strongly Coupled Plasmas, and Strongly Coupled Coulomb Systems.

Kalman was an External Member of the Hungarian Academy of Sciences, Fellow of New York Academy of Sciences, of the American Physical Society, and a member of the American Association for the Advancement of Science.

== Education ==
Kalman was born and educated in Hungary, where he received a Diploma in Electrical Engineering from the Technical University in Budapest in 1952. After graduation, he joined the then newly formed Central Research Institute for Physics of the Hungarian Academy of Sciences. He worked as Research Physicist, and from 1955 as Senior Research Physicist in the Department of Atomic Physics. He emigrated to Israel in 1956 and obtained a D.Sc. degree under the supervision of David Bohm and Nathan Rosen from the Technion-Israel Institute of Technology.

== Career ==
Kalman's scientific career started in the Central Research Institute for Physics in Budapest, Hungary, in 1952, where he worked under the supervision of Karoly Simonyi in a group studying thermonuclear fusion. After emigrating to Israel in 1956, Kalman worked at the Technion in Haifa as lecturer, promoted to associate professor in 1961. In the same year, Kalman obtained and accepted an invitation to join the Laboratoire de Physique des Plasmas, Universite de Paris, in Orsay, France. There, in 1962, he received an appointment to the position of Professeur Associé (equivalent to Full Professor) and had the responsibility of organizing a theoretical plasma physics group at the laboratory directed by Jean-Loup Delcroix. In 1965 he was appointed Directeur de Recherche at the C.N.R.S. Following this appointment, he received a visiting fellowship to the Joint Institute for Laboratory Astrophysics, at the University of Colorado from 1965 to 1966. While at the University of Colorado, in 1966 he accepted a visiting professorship at Brandeis University, and he decided to settle in the United States and resigned from his position in France. His association with Brandeis lasted through 1969. During the same period, he worked intermittently for the Air Force Cambridge Research Laboratories, holding the position of expert. Since 1970, he has been on the faculty of Boston College as research professor and received the title distinguished research professor in 1998, a position that he held until becoming professor emeritus in 2019. Between 1973 and 1978, he also held an honorary position and lectured on plasma astrophysics at the Center of Astrophysics, Harvard University.

Kalman held various visiting appointments since 1970. He served as a visiting scientist at Observatoire de Paris in 1973 and 1974, and at Groupe de Recherches Ionospheriques du CNRS in 1974. At the University of Oxford, he held appointment as a senior visiting scientist in 1975. He was appointed a Professeur d'Echange at Universite de Paris and Observatoire de Paris in 1976, served as research leader at International Centre for Theoretical Physics, Trieste in 1981 and 1984, and spent a semester as a visiting scholar at the University of California at San Diego in 1995. He lately provided advisory services to the Hungarian National Research, Development and Innovation Office, while continuing his collaboration with the Wigner Research Centre Group in Budapest.

== Research ==
Kalman's early research followed up on his thesis topic, which was the adaptation of the Bohm-Gross collective coordinate approach to transverse collective excitations in plasmas. Subsequently, he worked on the theory of non-linear plasma oscillations ad established, simultaneously with John Dawson, the fact that the exact description of this phenomenon can be worked out. In an independent line of research he studied relativistic particle systems and formulated a relativistic particle Lagrangian that became accepted in the literature. In the early 1960s, when the idea of a universal scalar field gained acceptance, Kalman was one of the few researchers realizing that a many particle system interacting through a scalar field (a "scalar plasma") possesses very peculiar properties and contrary to expectations it constitutes a physically realizable system.

From the 1970s onwards, Kalman's research focused on plasma response functions and the related fluctuation-dissipation theorems. He and his colleagues, K.I. Golden, M. Silevitch and Y Gu, developed a quadratic (as contrasted to the linear) fluctuation-dissipation theorem. This result allowed them to apply the method of non-linear response theory to the longstanding problem of strongly coupled plasmas. The resulting series of works then developed into a major research program on strongly coupled plasmas and the related Coulomb/Yukawa systems. In the subsequent years the research group in the Boston area, directed by him and K.I. Golden, became one of the internationally leading theoretical groups in the area of strongly coupled plasma research. In the 1990s their efforts culminated in the creation of a novel approach to the analysis of collective phenomena in strongly coupled plasmas, the Quasi–Linear Charge Approximation (QLCA), which since then has become the workhorse for the theoretical underpinning of experimental and computer simulation research in the area of complex plasmas.

In the 1990s Kalman and his group in the U. S. formed a close cooperation with a research group specializing in computer simulations in the Wigner Research Centre in Budapest.

The continued research efforts with this group on the topic of strongly coupled plasmas resulted in a number of novel findings. These include the discovery of an energy gap in the mode spectrum of bi- and tri-layers, normal and magnetic plasma shear modes, linear dispersion in electron-hole bilayers, the intricate mode structure of binary ionic mixtures, with a second plasmon and a gigantic Fano-like anti-resonance, structure forming due to dipole-dipole interaction.

Since the 1990s, with the emergence of complex (dusty) plasma experiments as a novel field of research, Kalman's work on strongly coupled Coulomb plasmas paralleled a research program on Yukawa many particle systems, where similar issues were in focus. In a series of papers both 2D and 3D Yukawa plasmas were investigated by Kalman's group, both from the point of view of their equilibrium structure and dynamical fluctuations and collective modes, for which the complete excitation and fluctuation spectrum were mapped out. Most of these works resulted from joint efforts with the computational group at the Wigner Research Centre and therefore their analytic findings are bolstered by the simulation of the behavior of the system on hand. The summary results were published in a review paper.

In addition to his work on strongly coupled Coulomb systems, Kalman has contributed to two major areas of research in the field of physics of charged particles. First, in collaboration with P. Bakshi and R. Cover, he analyzed the response and excitation spectrum of relativistic electron-positron plasma in an ultra-strong magnetic field, a scenario similar to the one that exists in pulsar atmospheres. One of the remarkable findings in this connection was the possible existence of a massive photon-like excitation. The second field is the emission spectrum of turbulent H plasmas, where again in collaboration with P. Bakshi and others, it was shown with the aid of group theoretic methods that the combination of the linear Stark effect with the ionic turbulence of the plasma leads to remarkable observational effects.

Kalman's continued involvement in the area of relativistic many-body systems also continued over the years in collaboration with Shu Lai and K. Datta. Kalman is considered as being one of the principal promoters of this research effort on strongly coupled Coulomb systems. He was the initiator of the series of conferences, which has developed into a regular tri-annual sequence of eponymous meetings. He has been serving as Chair and Member of organizing committees of this and other international conferences on this topic. Over the years, he served as Principal Investigator and Senior Investigator on a series of contracts and grants from the Air Force Office of Scientific Research, from the Air Force Geophysical Laboratories, from the Department of Energy and from the National Science Foundation.

== Personal life and death ==
Kalman died on December 10, 2022, two days shy of his 93rd birthday.

== Bibliography ==
=== Books ===
- Strongly Coupled Plasmas (Ed.) (1978) ISBN 9780306400391
- Strongly Coupled Coulomb Systems (Ed.) (1998) ISBN 9780306460319
