= Irma Mico =

French resistance fighter (1914–2022)

- Born: Irma Rosenberg; 12 December 1914; Chernivtsi, Bukovina, Cisleithania, Austria-Hungary
- Died: 4 January 2022 (aged 107)
- Occupation: Resistance fighter

Irma Mico (née Rosenberg, 12 December 1914 – 4 January 2022) was an Austro-Hungarian-born French resistance fighter.

== Biography ==
Rosenberg was born into a Romanian Jewish family in 1914 in Czernowitz, Bukovina, Cisleithania, Austria-Hungary. She married Grisha Rothstein and moved to Bucharest, Romania, as a member of the Romanian Communist Party. In 1937, facing a rise in nationalism, the couple moved to Paris, France. When her husband went off to fight in the Spanish Civil War between the Second Spanish Republic and the Francoist Spain, she met her second husband, Julien Mico. She joined the Main-d'œuvre immigrée and joined the Travail allemand, which attempted to persuade Wehrmacht soldiers to abandon their cause and switch sides. Thanks to her German-speaking abilities, Mico was able to participate in the program.

In her life after World War II, Mico gave lectures aimed at keeping the memory of the Holocaust alive. She died on 4 January 2022, at the age of 107.

== Publications ==
- Le dernier grand soir: Un Juif de Pologne (1980)
- Women in the Holocaust (1999)
- Dark Times, Dire Decisions: Jews and Communism (2004)

== Filmography ==
- Das Kind (2013)
