= János Fuzik =

Hungarian-Slovak journalist and politician (1957–2022)

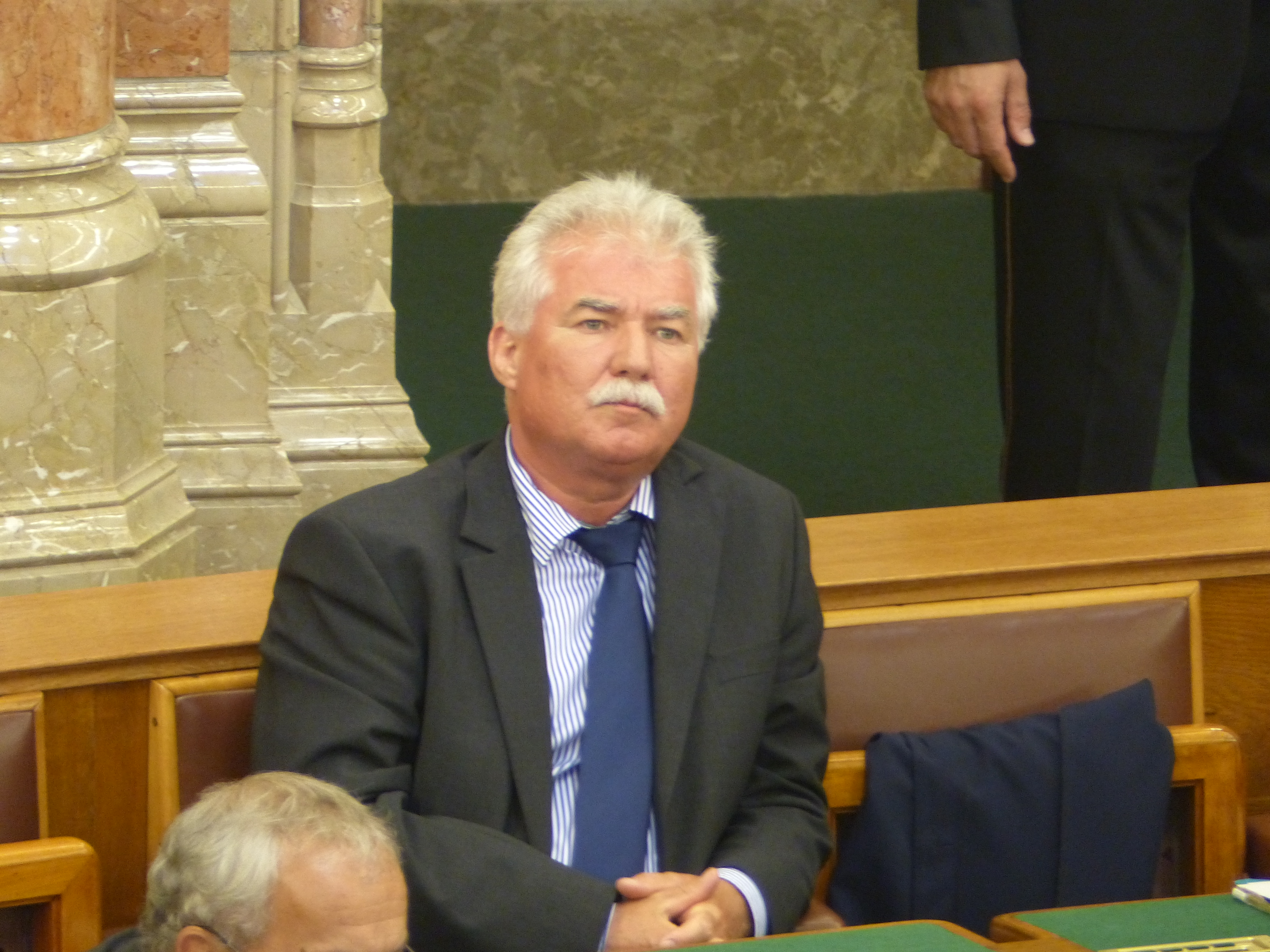
- Fuzik in 2016

Ethnic Ombudsman of Slovaks in Hungary in the National Assembly
- In office 6 May 2014 – 7 May 2018
- Preceded by: position established
- Succeeded by: Antal Paulik

Personal details
- Born: 10 October 1957 Kesztölc, Hungary
- Died: 7 September 2022 (aged 64)
- Party: OSZÖ
- Education: Comenius University
- Occupation: Journalist

János Fuzik (10 October 1957 – 7 September 2022) was a Hungarian journalist and politician. A member of the National Self-Government of Slovakians in Hungary, he served as Ethnic Ombudsman of Slovaks in Hungary in the National Assembly from 2014 to 2018. In 2020, he was appointed Head of the Consulate General of Hungary in Esek.

Fuzik died on 7 September 2022, at the age of 64.
