= Roch Kereszty =

Hungarian-American monk and scholar (1933–2022)

- Born: February 6, 1933
- Died: December 14, 2022 (aged 89)
- Education: Pontifical Athenaeum of Saint Anselm
- Occupations: Monk and Scholar

Roch András Kereszty (February 6, 1933 – December 14, 2022) was a Hungarian-American monk and scholar.

== Life ==
Kereszty was born in Budapest on February 6, 1933. His mother was a high-school teacher and his father a decorated veteran. Neither were practicing Catholics; they struggled to maintain a stable marriage.

Kereszty attended a school run by Cistercian priests from Zirc Abbey and entered the novitiate at a time when the abbey was suppressed by the Communist regime, making it necessary to hold classes in secret, and at great danger. Soon after the Hungarian uprising of 1956, he fled to Rome. where he continued his studies. He took solemn vows for Zirc Abbey while a refugee in Austria, with the abbot of Lilienfeld Abbey as a proxy on 18 September 1960. Two weeks later, on 2 October 1960, he was ordained a priest by the bishop of St. Pölten, in his private chapel.

Kereszty went to Rome for a doctorate in theology at the Pontifical Atheneum of St. Anselm, and then, in 1963 moved to the new monastery Hungarian Cistercians had founded in Dallas, Texas. There, he served as master of novices and a professor at the University of Dallas. Although he was soon recalled from the university by his abbot and assigned to teach at the prep school, he later returned to the university and served there as a professor for decades. He was university chaplain for several semesters. In addition to his academic work, throughout his priestly life he was a sought-after spiritual director and confessor to laity and priests alike.

Kereszty died in Dallas on December 14, 2022, at the age of 89.

== Monographs (selection) ==
- Die Weisheit in der mystischen Erfahrung beim hl. Bernhard von Clairvaux. Dissertation, Westmalle 1963.
- God seekers for a new age; from crisis theology to Christian atheism. Editor. Pflaum Press, Dayton, Ohio 1970.
- Rediscovering the Eucharist: Ecumenical Considerations. Paulist Press, New York 2003.
- Wedding Feast of the Lamb: eucharistic theology from a historical, biblical, and systematic perspective. HillenbrandBooks, Chicago 2004.
- Christianity among other religions: apologetics in a contemporary context (edited by Andrew C. Gregg). St. Pauls, Staten Island, N.Y. 2006.
- Jesus Christ: Fundamentals of Christology. St. Pauls Publications, 1991, first edition; a third edition followed in 2018. It included an appendix with a Reader's Guide and an essay on Bernard of Clairvaux's Christology.
- The Church of God in Jesus Christ: a Catholic Ecclesiology. The Catholic University of America Press, Washington, D.C 2019.
- Rekindle the Gift of God. A Handbook for Priestly Life. Ignatius Press, San Francisco 2021.

== Journal articles ==
Kereszty published in the journal Communio from 1974 to 2021. In the years 1983–2021, he published a total of 36 articles in the journal, focussing on the topics of ecclesiology, Christology, Bernard of Clairvaux, Jewish-Catholic relations, and current controversies in Catholic theology. He also published frequently in the Analecta Cisterciensia and reviewed books for The Thomist.

== Literature ==
- Peter Casarella: "Roch Kereszty: Master of Cistercian Ressourcement." Communio 50.4 (2023), pp. 768–793.
