= András Várhelyi =

Hungarian writer and politician (1953–2022)

András Várhelyi MP

Member of the National Assembly of Hungary
- In office 1998–2002

Personal details
- Born: 21 October 1953 Szilvásvárad, Hungary
- Died: 15 August 2022 (aged 68)
- Party: FKGP
- Education: Eötvös Loránd University
- Occupation: Writer

András Várhelyi (21 October 1953 – 15 August 2022) was a Hungarian writer and politician. A member of the Independent Smallholders, Agrarian Workers and Civic Party, he served in the National Assembly from 1998 to 2002.

Várhelyi died on 15 August 2022, at the age of 68.
