= Péter Róna =

Hungarian economist

Peter Róna
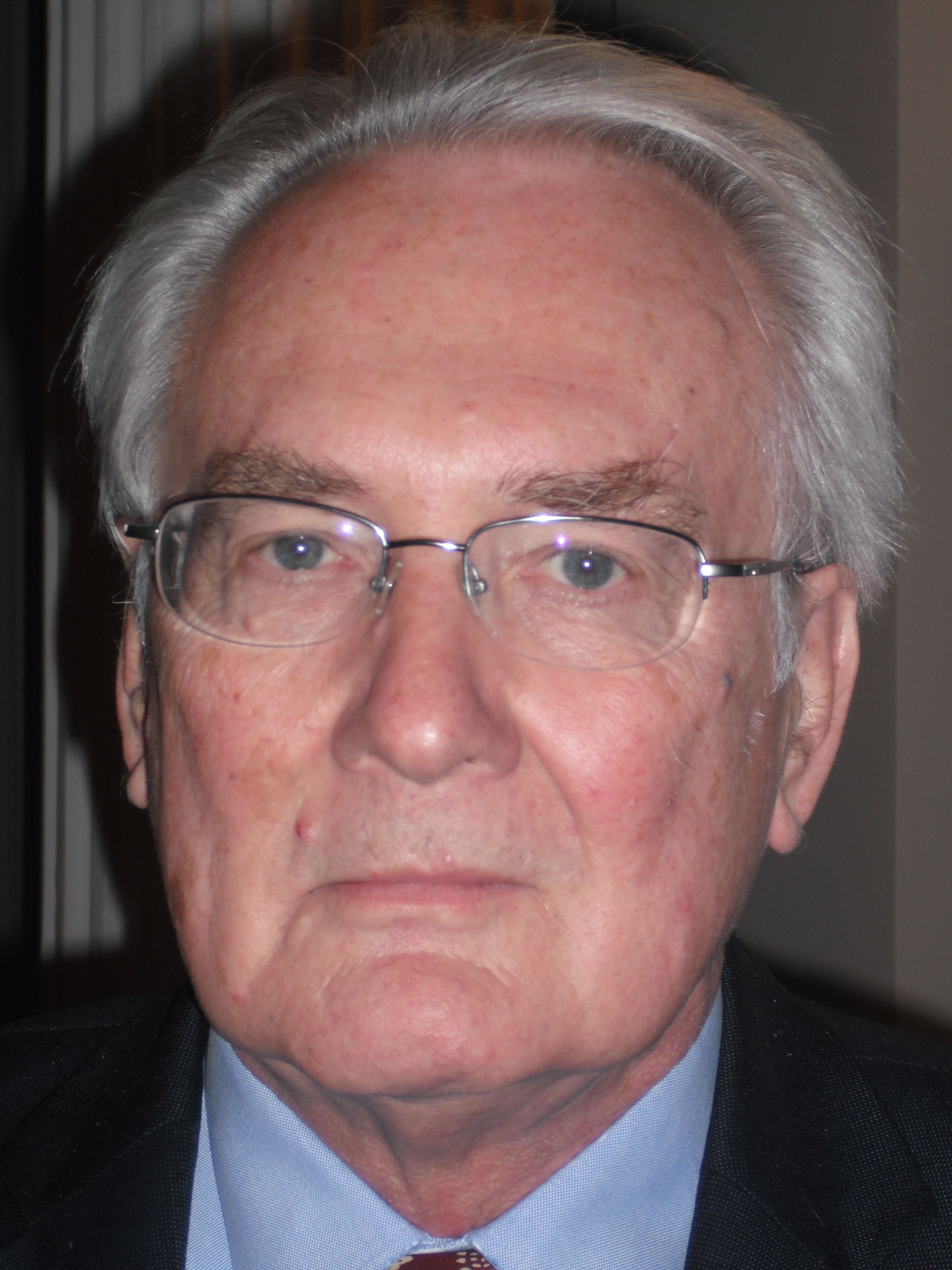
- Peter Róna in 2009

Personal details
- Born: Péter Zsolt Róna; 4 May 1942 (age 84) Miskolc, Hungary
- Party: Jobbik (2024)
- Other political affiliations: LMP (2011–2018); Independent (2018–2024)
- Spouse: Kinga Róna
- Children: 2
- Education: University of Pennsylvania; University of Oxford
- Occupation: Economist • Lawyer

Péter Róna

Academic background
- Education: University of Pennsylvania (1964) (BSc); University of Oxford (1966)

Academic work
- Institutions: Eötvös Loránd University (2004–2010); Blackfriars Hall (2010–present)
- Notable ideas: Philosophy of economics

Péter Zsolt Róna (born 4 May 1942) is a Hungarian economist and lawyer. He has been fellow of Blackfriars Hall of the University of Oxford since 2010, where he lectures on the philosophical foundations of the social sciences.

Between 1986 and 1990 he was president and CEO of J. Henry Schroders bank. Between 1990 and 2004 he was founding president of the Hungarian subsidiary of the bus manufacturing company NABI, and president and CEO of Első Magyar Alap.

Róna was the nominee of the United for Hungary political alliance in the 2022 Hungarian presidential election. Two years later, he led Jobbik’s list in the 2024 European parliament election, where the party got 0,99%.
