= György Moldova =

Hungarian writer (1934–2022)

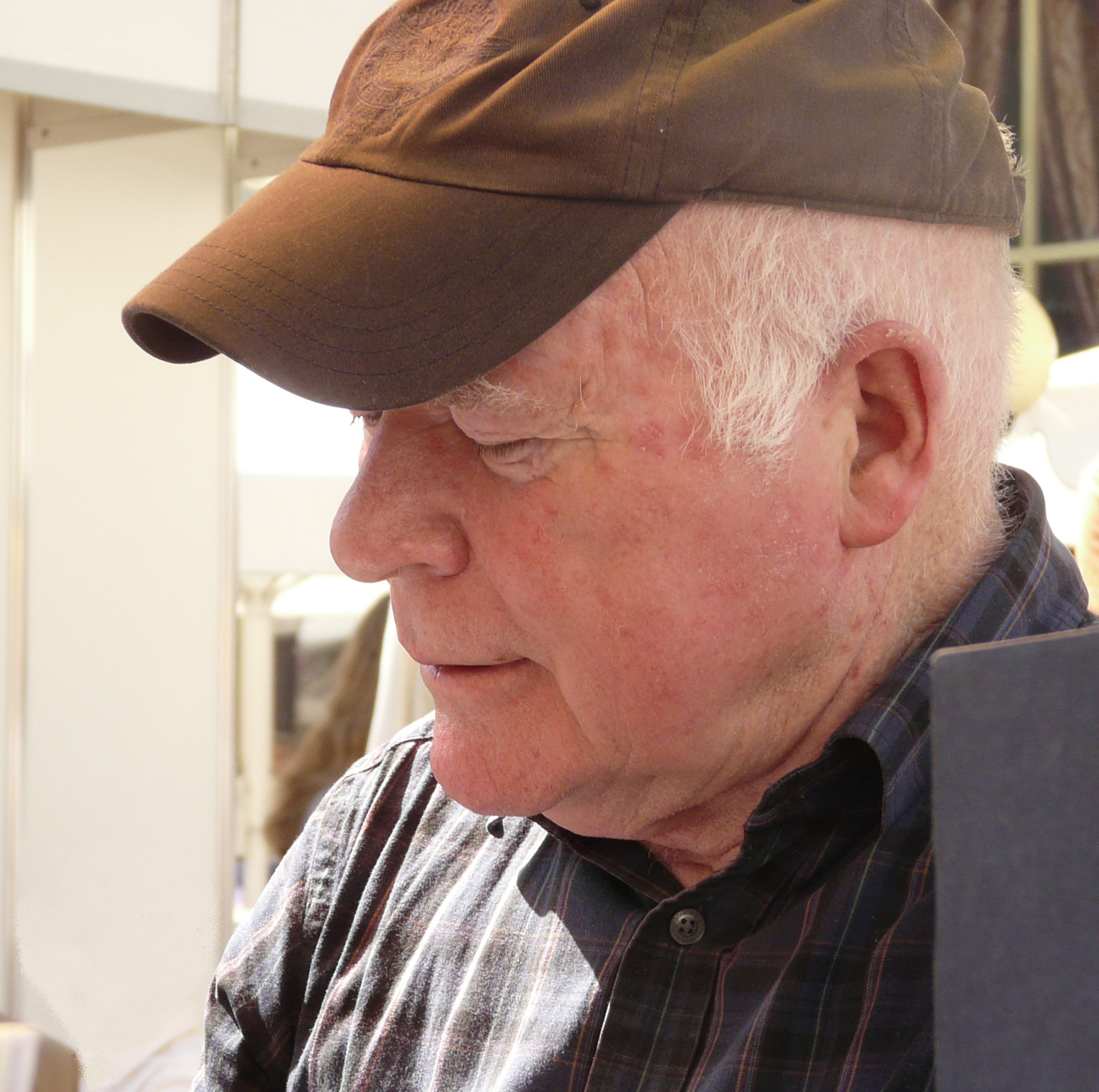
- Moldova in 2010
- Born: György Reif; 12 March 1934; Budapest, Hungary
- Died: 4 June 2022 (aged 88); Budapest, Hungary
- Occupation: Writer
- Writing career
- Language: Hungarian
- Notable awards: Kossuth Prize (1983), Attila József (1973, 1978), and numerous other national honors in Hungary

György Moldova (12 March 1934 – 4 June 2022) was the author of more than seventy books in Hungary that have collectively sold more than 13 million copies, more than any other Hungarian writer. He is best known for his richly detailed sociological nonfiction focusing on everyday life and concerns within specific industries or professions (e.g., railway, mining, and law enforcement) and in particular regions of Hungary—thoroughly researched works that draw on the author's travels and his interviews with participants.

Also popular for his satirical works, Moldova received numerous honors in his native land, including the Kossuth Prize. His books include plays and novels as well; among the latter is Sötét angyal (Dark Angel), published in English translation in 1967 (Corvina Press, Budapest). One of his nonfiction books was published in 2012 as Ballpoint: A Tale of Genius and Grit, Perilous Times, and the Invention that Changed the Way We Write (New Europe Books, North Adams, Massachusetts). Moldova lived in Budapest.

== Life and literary legacy ==
Given the name György Reif at birth, the future author and his parents, being of Jewish descent, were interned within Budapest's Jewish ghetto in late 1944 until the end of World War II. He later studied at Budapest's College of Theatre and Drama, leaving in 1957 soon before finishing, after a fellow student and a teacher of his were imprisoned following the 1956 Revolution; Moldova was not awarded his degree. Both during his college studies and after, he also held a range of jobs—as a furnace repairman, miner, gardener, canning factory worker, and teacher in reform schools. Starting in 1958 Moldova worked for years as a screenwriter and playwright, making little headway in the former pursuit but seeing his plays staged in theaters to considerable success. His stories had been appearing in literary journals and anthologies since 1955.

In addition to his many books and plays over the decades, Moldova has published numerous pieces in the Budapest satirical biweekly Hócipő since 1989. In the early 1990s he also wrote weekly pieces for the Budapest daily newspaper Magyar Hirlap.

Moldova's writing is characterized by a concern for the central issues of everyday life, action, and characters who count as solitary, everyday heroes—with his nonfiction steeped in a tradition comparable to the New Journalism. His nonfiction books in particular, often on matters of practical concern to millions of Hungarians, have made him a household name. While occupying the fringes of Hungary's traditional literary establishment, Moldova is held in much esteem as a writer by readers from all sectors of Hungarian society, including some who otherwise take exception to his outspoken leftist/communist sympathies.

== Foreign responses ==
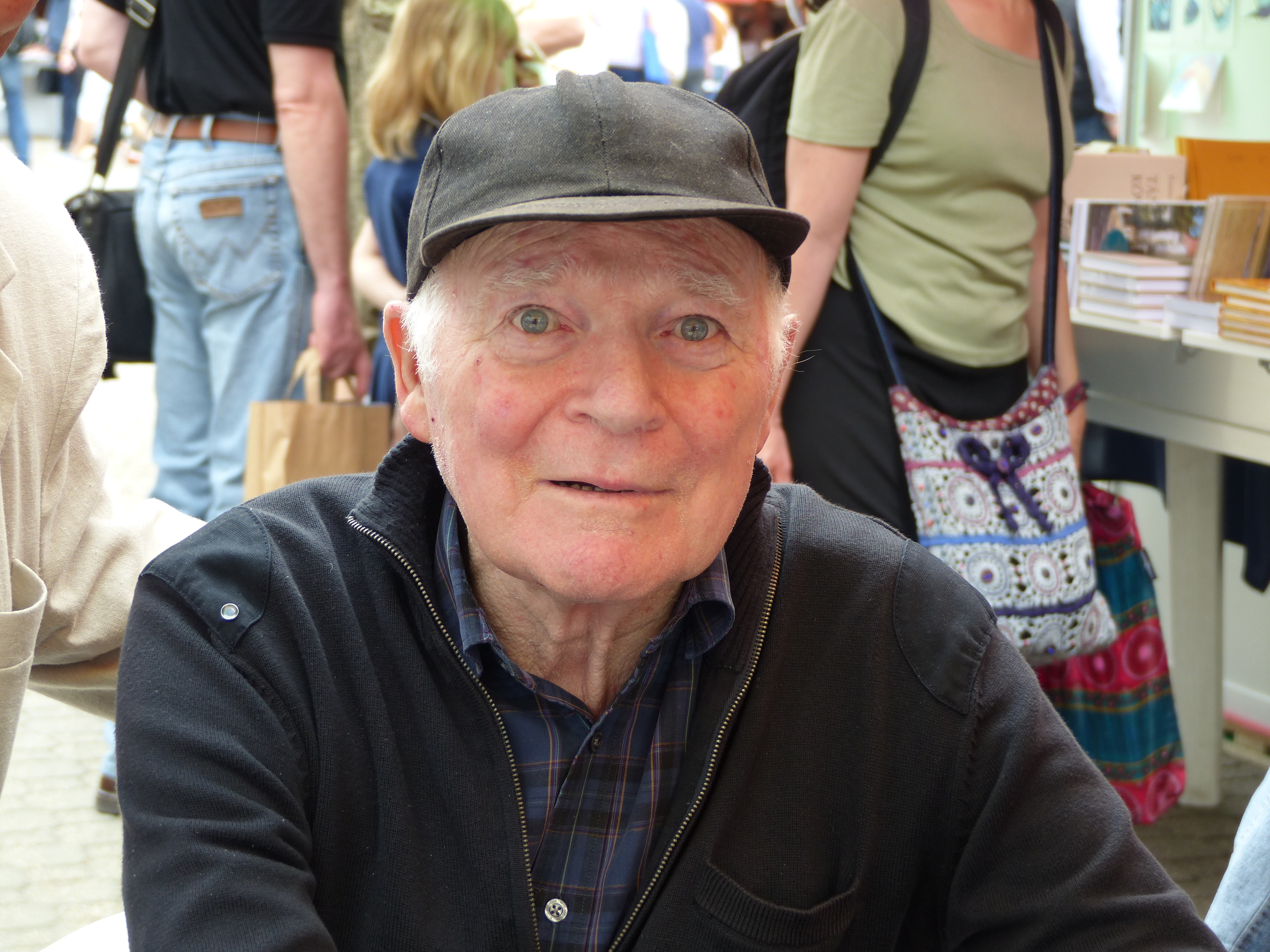
György Moldova in Downtown Budapest

As for foreign responses to his work, the English-language translation of Moldova's book on the invention of the ballpoint pen (New Europe Books, 2012) has elicited comments from outside of Hungary, including:

"Ballpoint reads like a fast-paced mystery. Although we know from the start that its technological protagonist—the ballpoint pen—will triumph, we find ourselves repeatedly surprised by the story's unfolding episodes of international intrigue, financial deception, and legal shenanigans." —Henry Petroski, author of The Pencil and The Essential Engineer

"The tale of László Bíró and Andor Goy and their development of the ballpoint pen is a wonderful illustration of the role that human passions, foibles, and genius play in shaping the world around us." —Robert Friedel, author of Zipper: an Exploration in Novelty

== Political controversy ==
In 1988, Moldova published the book Bűn az élet (Life is Crime). The book, which focuses on the real lives of cops on the beat, contained an exploration of what in the socialist era had been officially classified as cigánybűnözés (gypsy crime), referring to the relatively high crime rate among the country's Roma minority. The term has since fallen out of favor among most political parties in Hungary due to its racist and antiziganist overtones. Bűn az élet has been criticized due to its "one-sided portrayal of Roma criminals". According to lawyer and civil rights activist János Bársony, Moldova's book was instrumental in justifying the antiziganism of the late 1980s by portraying police officers as "Wild West heroes who protect the people". The sociologist György Szerbhorváth even stated that the book "was commissioned by the Ministry of the Interior; [Moldova] received information from the ministry, which later turned out to be false." Szerbhorváth added that Moldova's "uncritical reporting of anti-Roma statements would contribute to the spreading of anti-Roma sentiments and misconceptions, especially to the spreading of the concept of ‘Roma crime’, referring to it as a constantly increasing and significant phenomenon, suggesting that “crime is in their blood”, and that the Roma do not want to work."

Although he himself was a self-professed "independent leftist" who never belonged to a political party, Moldova was openly supportive of communist ideals and was known for his loyalty to the late János Kádár, Hungarian communist leader and General Secretary of the Hungarian Socialist Workers' Party, who ruled the country from 1956 until his forced retirement in 1988. Most famously, Moldova published a biography, Kádár, in which he termed this longest-ruling of all twentieth-century Hungarian political figures a "genius" and suggested that the executions of political prisoners after the 1956 Hungarian Revolution had been justified.

== Partial list of works ==
=== Fiction ===
- Idegen bajnok (Foreign Champion; story collection, 1963)
- Sötét angyal (Dark Angel; novel, 1967)
- A beszélő disznó (The Talking Hog; 1978) – a satire set in a state agricultural cooperative in which a hog named Józsi learns how to talk—and curse.

=== Nonfiction ===
- Az Őrség panasza (1977) – a book about one of Hungary's most cherished regions, the Őrség
- Tisztelet Komlónak (1971) – an homage to one of Hungary's most important coal mining regions
- Akit a mozdony füstje megcsapott (1977) – an inside look at Hungary's railway sector
- A szent tehén: Riport a textiliparról (1980) – a portrait of Hungary's textile industry
- Bűn az élet (1988) – a provocative inside look at Hungarian police late in the communist era, with a particular focus on their handling of "Gypsy crime."
- A végtelen vonal: Legenda a golyóstollról (2001). English translation: Ballpoint: A Tale of Perilous Times, Genius and Grit, and the Invention that Changed the Way We Write (New Europe Books, 2012).
- Kádár János I-II. (2006) – Moldova's provocative reassessment of Hungary's longest-serving twentieth-century ruler, János Kádár
- Keserű Pohár 1. kötet: A magyar borászokról és a magyar borokról. (2011) – a look at Hungarian vintners and their wines.

=== Published in English ===
- Ballpoint: A Tale of Genius and Grit, Perilous Times, and the Invention that Changed the Way We Write, New Europe Books (2012) - 208 pages
- Dark Angel (a novel), Corvina Press (1967) - 285 pages

== Sources ==
This page started out as a translation of portions of the Hungarian-language Wikipedia page on György Moldova, with biographical and other information added from sources including the Hungarian-language author biography on the website of Budapest's Petőfi Literary Museum (see external references below) and the English translation of Ballpoint (New Europe Books, 2012).
