= Robert O. Fisch =

Hungarian-born American pediatrician (1925–2022)

Robert O. Fisch (June 12, 1925 – June 12, 2022) was a Hungarian-born American pediatrician, artist, and author.

== Biography ==
Fisch was born in Budapest, Hungary, on June 12, 1925, the son of Zoltan and Iren Fisch. His family was Jewish. He survived a Nazi concentration camp during the Second World War. After the war Fisch attended medical school in Hungary and participated in the Hungarian Revolution of 1956. In 1957, after a death threat, Fisch emigrated from Hungary to the United States where he became world-renowned for his work in pediatrics, specifically with phenylketonuria. He coauthored more than 100 scientific papers.

Fisch was an artist as well as an author. His most notable book is Light from the Yellow Star. Other titles include: Metamorphosis To Freedom, Children’s Letters To A Holocaust Survivor, and Fisch Stories. After he retired, Fisch spent his time speaking to children about the importance of humanity. Fisch conceived the exhibit "The Value of One Life" at the Minnesota History Center.

Fisch died at home in Minneapolis, Minnesota, on June 12, 2022, on his 97th birthday.
