= István Aranyos =

Hungarian gymnast (1942–2022)

- Born: 25 April 1942 Budapest, Kingdom of Hungary
- Died: 22 September 2022 (aged 80) Budapest, Hungary
- Height: 1.69 m (5 ft 7 in)

Gymnastics career
- Discipline: Men's artistic gymnastics
- Country represented: Hungary
- Club: Budapesti Honvéd Sportegyesület

István Aranyos (25 April 1942 – 22 September 2022) was a Hungarian gymnast. He competed at the 1964 Summer Olympics and the 1968 Summer Olympics.
