= 2022 Hungarian presidential election =

- 10 March 2022

Needed to win: Two-thirds of all members of the National Assembly (first ballot) 199 MPs, 133 votes needed to win
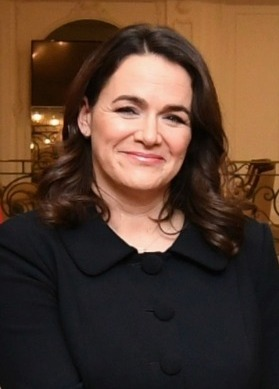

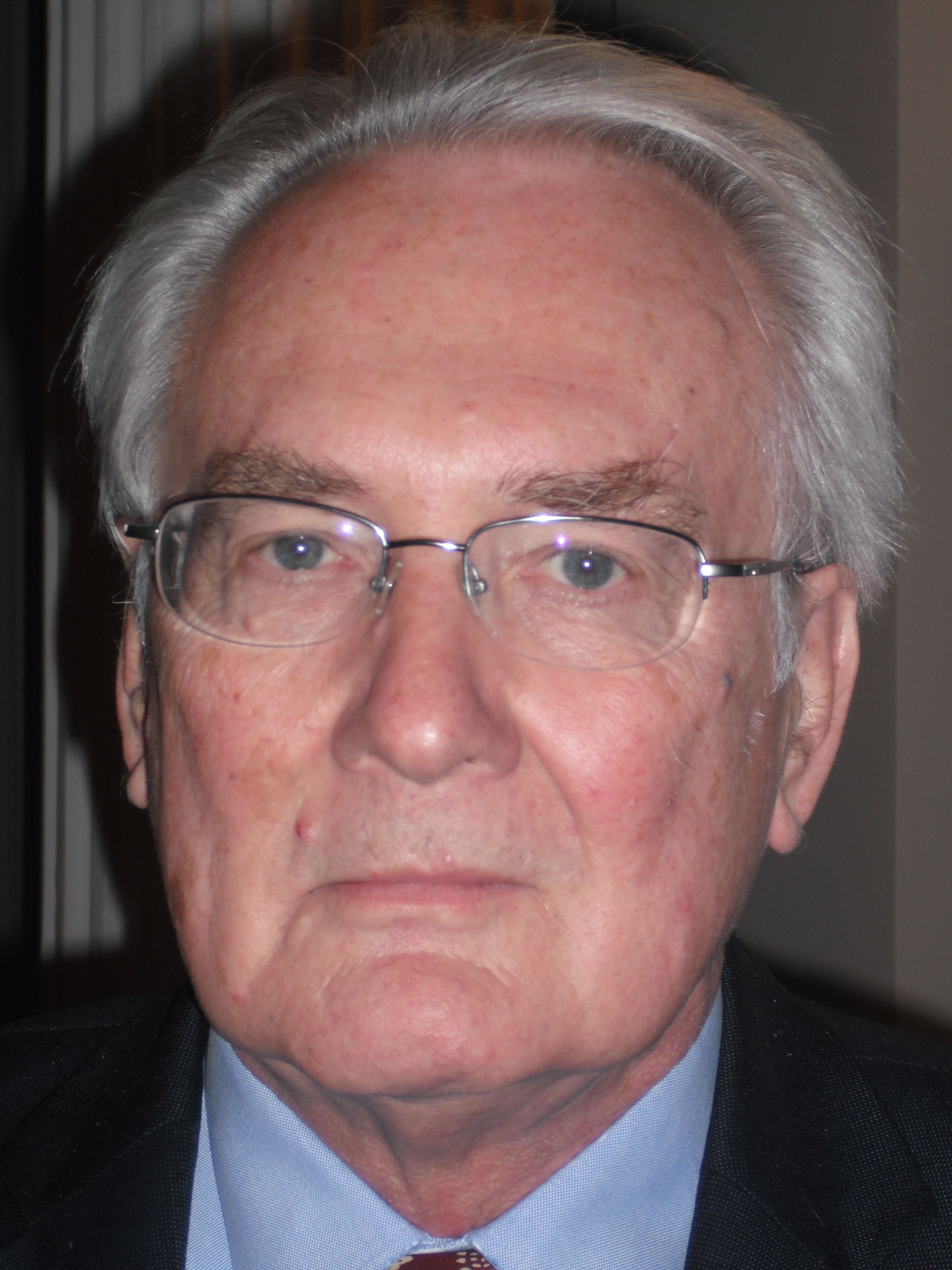
Nominee	Katalin Novák	Péter Róna
Party	Fidesz	Independent
Alliance	Fidesz–KDNP	EM
Electoral vote	137	51
Percentage	72.87%	27.13%
President before election
János Áder
Fidesz
Elected President
Katalin Novák
Fidesz

An indirect presidential election was held in Hungary on 10 March 2022. Incumbent President János Áder was ineligible for a third term due to constitutional limits. Former Minister for Family Affairs Katalin Novák became the first female president of Hungary after winning two-third majority.

== Background ==
Incumbent president of the Republic János Áder was ineligible to run due to term limits. There were two candidates for the post. The governing alliance, Fidesz-KDNP, nominated Katalin Novák, the former minister for family affairs and an ally of Hungarian prime minister Viktor Orbán, as its presidential candidate. The opposition alliance, United for Hungary, nominated Péter Róna, a lawyer and economist, as its presidential candidate.

The opposition Democratic Coalition (DK) is re-submitting an amendment proposal to postpone the parliamentary election of Hungary's president until after the parliamentary election in the spring of 2022, the party said on 5 August 2021.

== Electoral system ==
Under the current Constitution of Hungary adopted by the Fidesz–KDNP government coalition in 2011, the president must be elected in a secret ballot by the members of Parliament, no sooner than sixty but no later than thirty days before expiry of the mandate of the previous officeholder, or if his or her mandate terminated prematurely, within thirty days of the termination. The constitution authorizes the speaker of the National Assembly to set the date for the election.

A presidential candidate needs the written nomination of at least one-fifth of the members of Parliament (thus 40 MPs), who may not nominate more than one candidate; it is thus mathematically impossible for there to be more than four candidates. In the first round of the election, a two-thirds majority of all incumbent MPs is required to elect the president. If this condition is not fulfilled, a second round is held between the two candidates who received the highest and second highest numbers of votes in the first round. A simple majority of the voting MPs is then sufficient.

== Candidates ==
Name	Party	Nominators	Notes	Offices held
Katalin Novák	Fidesz	Fidesz–KDNP		Minister for Family Affairs (2020–2021)
Péter Róna	Independent	United for Hungary		—

== Result ==
Candidate	Nominated by	Votes	%
Katalin Novák	Fidesz–KDNP	137	70.98
Péter Róna	United for Hungary	51	26.42
Total minimum		133	
Valid votes		188	97.41
Invalid/blank votes		5	2.59
Voters		193	100
Absentees		6	3.02
Total/turnout		199	96.98
