= István T. Horváth =

Hungarian American chemist (1953–2022)

István Horváth
- Born: István T. Horváth; August 6, 1953; Budapest, Hungary
- Died: March 7, 2022 (aged 68)
- Known for: Fluorous biphase catalysis, in situ spectroscopy
- Awards: Fluorous Technology Award (2005); Senior Humboldt Research Award (2006); Green Chemistry Lecture Award (2008)
- Scientific career
- Fields: Chemist
- Workplaces: City University of Hong Kong
- Website: www.hit-team.net

István T. Horváth (6 August 1953 – 7 March 2022) was a Hungarian American chemist, working on greener and more sustainable chemistry since its inception. In particular, he focuses on homogeneous transition metal catalysis and in situ spectroscopy. He was highly involved and very influential in the now enormous field of fluorous solvents and technologies.

== Education ==
Horváth obtained his Diploma in Chemical Engineering (1977) and Ph.D. in Chemistry (1979) at Veszprem University in Hungary.

== Career ==
Following his PhD, Horváth went on to spend time at Yale University as a Postdoctoral research associate (1982–1984), and as a Scientific Co-worker at ETH Zurich (1984–1987). This was followed by a stint at ExxonMobil Corporate Research, Anandale, New Jersey (1987–1998). He re-entered academia at the Institute of Chemistry in Eötvös Loránd University, Budapest (1999–2009), and then became a Chair Professor of Chemistry and the Head of the Department of Biology and Chemistry at the City University of Hong Kong.

== Research ==
As of 2015 his research lies in the conversion of biomass into platform chemicals, and the development of more sustainable fluorous solvent-based processes. He proposed that gamma-Valerolactone (GVL) exhibits the most important characteristics of a sustainable liquid and it can be used for the production of both energy and carbon-based consumer products. It was confirmed by isotope labeling that fructose can be converted to hydroxymethylfurfural (HMF) then to levulinic acid (LA) and formic acid (FA) and finally to GVL in GVL as the solvent. He is also the editor of numerous books and other peer-reviewed publications in the fields of catalysis, green chemistry, and fluorous technologies.

== Awards and honours ==
Horváth was made an Honorary Member of the Accademia Nazionale di Scienze, Lettere e Arti Modena in 2010.

He was elected Fellow of the American Chemical Society in 2014.
