= Mária Wittner =

Hungarian revolutionary and politician (1937–2022)

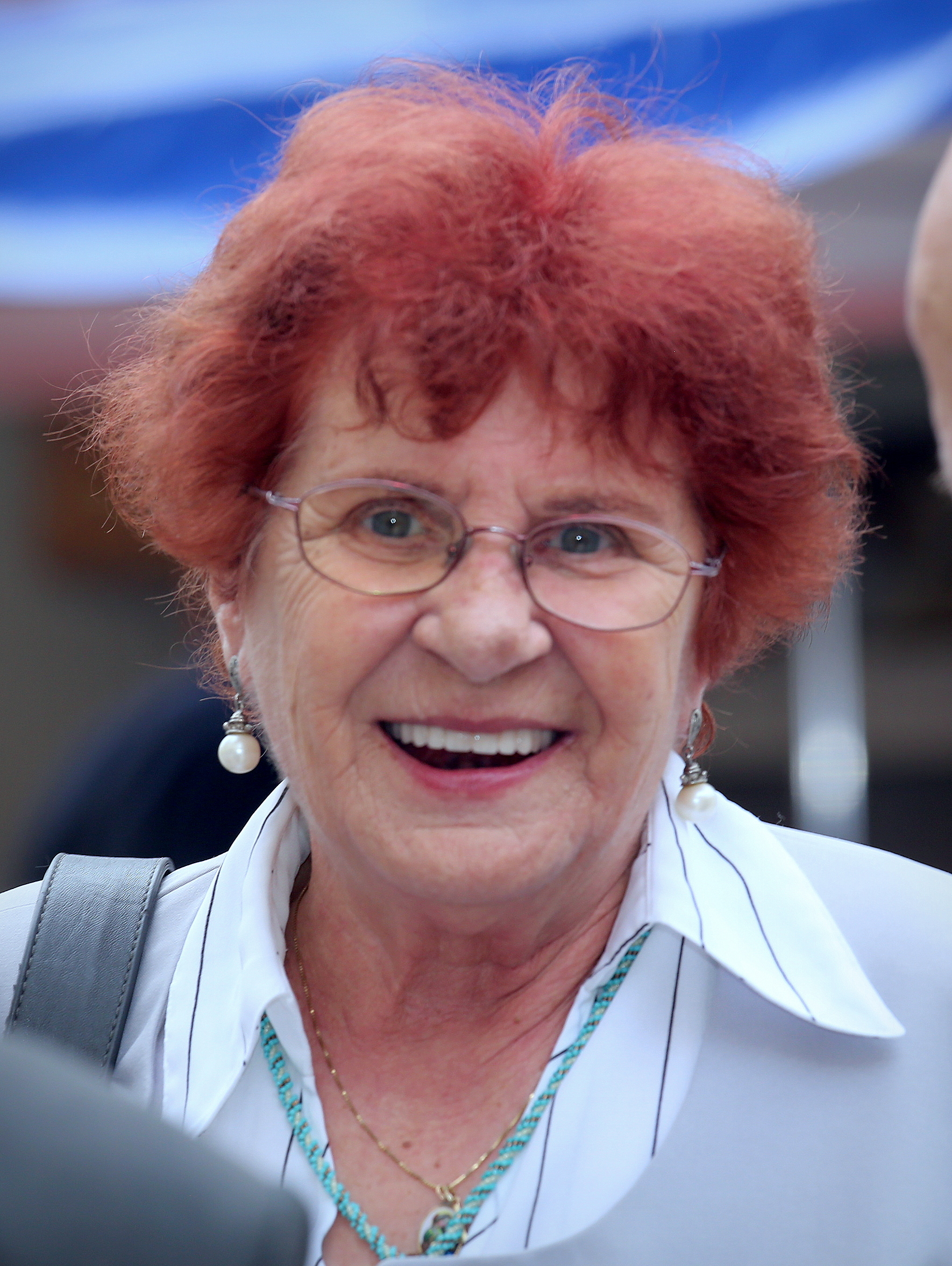

Member of the National Assembly
- In office 16 May 2006 – 5 May 2014

Personal details
- Born: 9 June 1937 Budapest, Hungary
- Died: 14 September 2022 (aged 85) Budapest, Hungary
- Party: Fidesz
- Profession: Stenographer, politician

Mária Wittner (Gazdagh-Wittner; 9 June 1937 – 14 September 2022) was a Hungarian revolutionary and politician who participated in the Hungarian Revolution of 1956.

== Early life ==
Wittner was born in Budapest on 9 June 1937. She did not know her father and her mother sent her to nuns. At the age of two, she was sent to a Carmelite cloister. In 1948, she met with her mother, who soon sent her to state care. She discontinued her secondary school studies and began to work as a typist and shorthand writer in Szolnok and for the Council of Kiskunhegyes district. She gave birth to a son in 1955 and, half a year later, moved to Budapest. She meanwhile undertook odd jobs.

== 1956 revolution and aftermath ==
Wittner participated in the demonstration on 23 October 1956 and joined the revolutionaries during the siege of the Magyar Rádió building. She met Katalin Havrila, and on the following days, they together helped the provision of the wounded. Later, she became a member of the Vajdahunyad Street resistance group and with her companion they occupied the police station of the tenth district to find weapons on 30 October 1956. She was wounded by shrapnel in Üllői út on 4 November during the Soviet invasion.

Wittner was treated in Péterfy Sándor State Hospital. She tried to escape from the occupied country but was arrested. She was questioned and then freed and then tried to flee the country once again and spent a few weeks in Austria. Then, she came back to Hungary and began to work as an unskilled worker. Wittner was arrested on 16 July 1957 and was sentenced to death on 23 July 1958. The sentence was modified to life imprisonment by the second appeal court on 24 February 1959. She was released from prison on 25 March 1970.

Firstly she worked in a dressmaker's room and later as a cleaner. Since 1980, she has been a disability pensioner. After the end of communism, she has been actively involved in the work of different veteran organisations of the 1956 revolution. She was awarded the Grand Cross Order of Merit of the Republic of Hungary in 1991.

== Political career ==
Wittner was elected Member of Parliament from the Fidesz National List in the 2006 and 2010 parliamentary elections. She was a member of the Committee on Employment and Labour between 30 May 2006 and 13 May 2010. She was appointed a member of the Committee on Human Rights, Minority, Civic and Religious Affairs on 14 May 2010.
