= Katalin Novák =

President of Hungary from 2022 to 2024

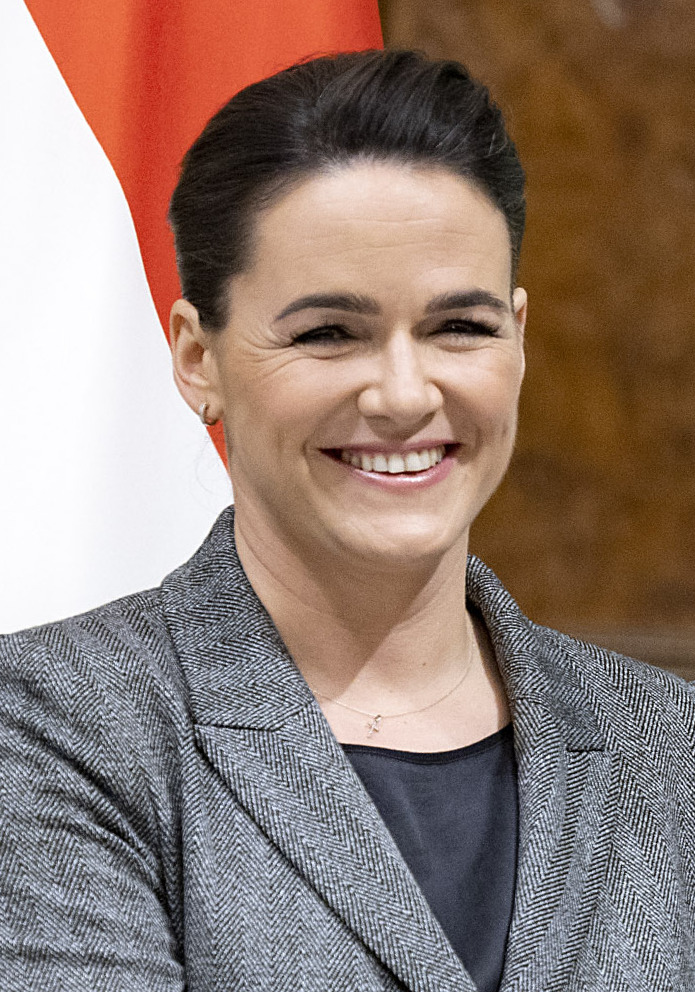
- Novák in 2023

President of Hungary
- In office 10 May 2022 – 26 February 2024
- Prime Minister: Viktor Orbán
- Preceded by: János Áder
- Succeeded by: Tamás Sulyok (Note: László Kövér served as acting president between Novák's resignation and Sulyok's election.)

Minister for Family Affairs
- In office 1 October 2020 – 31 December 2021
- Prime Minister: Viktor Orbán
- Preceded by: Position established
- Succeeded by: Vilmos Kátai-Németh (2026)

Member of the National Assembly
- In office 8 May 2018 – 1 May 2022

Personal details
- Born: Katalin Éva Novák; 6 September 1977 (age 49) Szeged, Hungarian People's Republic
- Party: Fidesz
- Spouse: István Veres
- Children: 3
- Education: Corvinus University of Budapest (MSc); University of Szeged (JD)

Katalin Éva Veresné Novák (Note: Hungarian pronunciation: [ˈkɒtɒlin ˈnovaːk]) (born 6 September 1977) is a Hungarian politician who served as president of Hungary from 2022 to 2024. Elected at the age of 44, she was the first woman and youngest person ever to hold the post. Prior to her presidency, she had been a member of the National Assembly for Fidesz from 2018 to 2022, during which time she had also served as Minister for Family Affairs in the fourth Orbán government, from 2020 to 2021.

In early 2024, Novák became embroiled in—and eventually resigned due to—a scandal involving her April 2023 presidential pardon of Endre Kónya, a former deputy director of an orphanage in Bicske who had been imprisoned due to his involvement in a pedophilia case implicating the orphanage's director.

== Education ==
After completing her secondary education at the Ságvári Endre Secondary School at Szeged in 1996, Novák studied economics at the Corvinus University of Budapest and law at the University of Szeged. While a student, she also studied abroad at the Paris Nanterre University. In addition to her native Hungarian, Novák speaks French, English, German, and Spanish.

== Political career ==
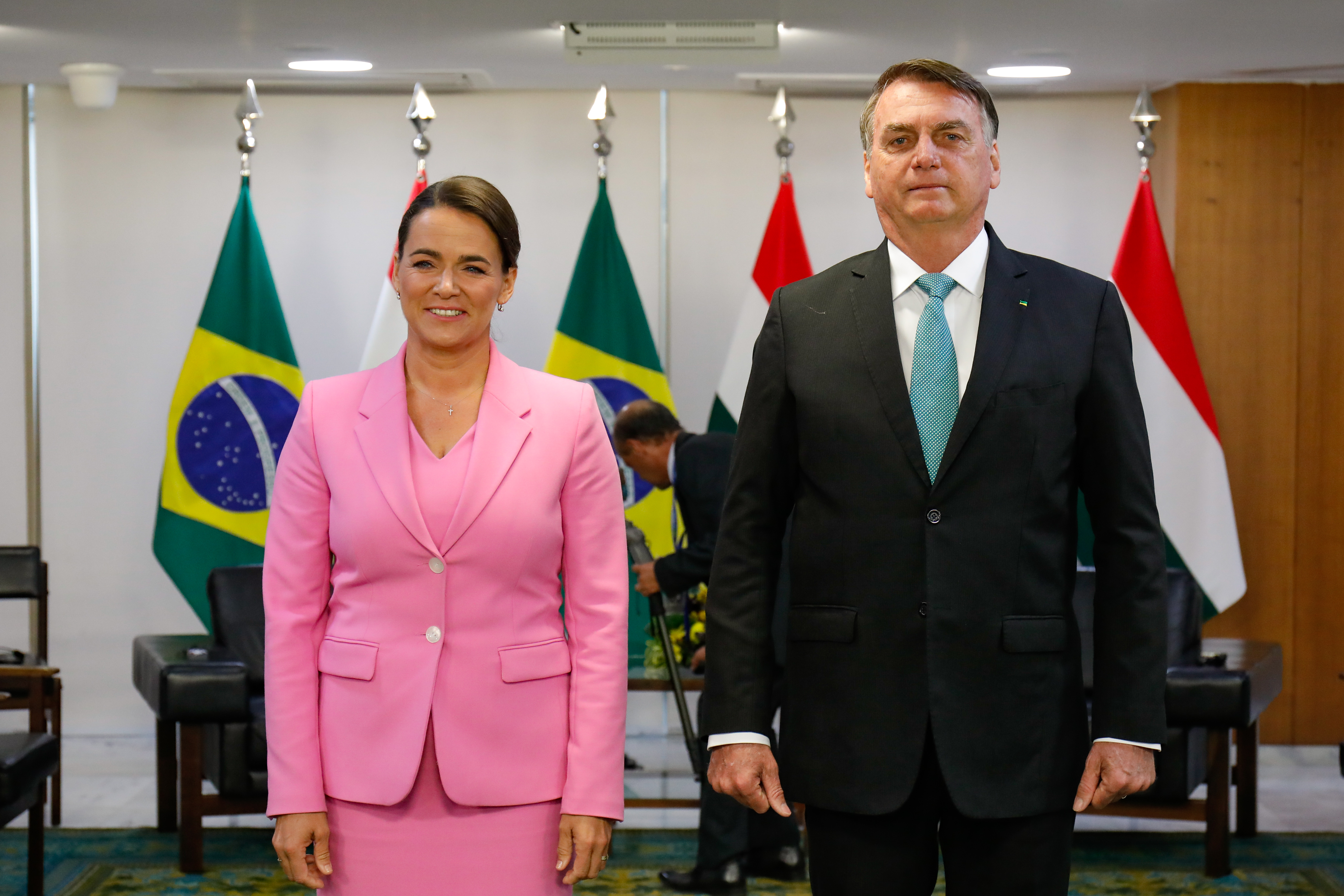
Novák with Brazilian President Jair Bolsonaro in Brasília, 20 June 2022

Novák began working at the Hungarian Ministry of Foreign Affairs in 2001, specializing in European Union and European matters. In 2010, she became a ministerial advisor. and was appointed Head of Cabinet of the Ministry of Human Resources in 2012.

In 2014 she became State Secretary for Family and Youth Affairs at the Ministry of Human Capacities, eventually becoming Minister of Family Affairs in October 2020. She held this position until December 2021.

She served as Vice President of Fidesz between 2017 and 2021.

On 21 December 2021, Prime Minister Viktor Orbán announced that Novák would be Fidesz's nominee in the 2022 presidential election. On 10 March 2022, she won gaining 137 out of 188 votes in the National Assembly. Novák is the first woman to hold the office of president in its history.

== Presidency (2022–2024) ==
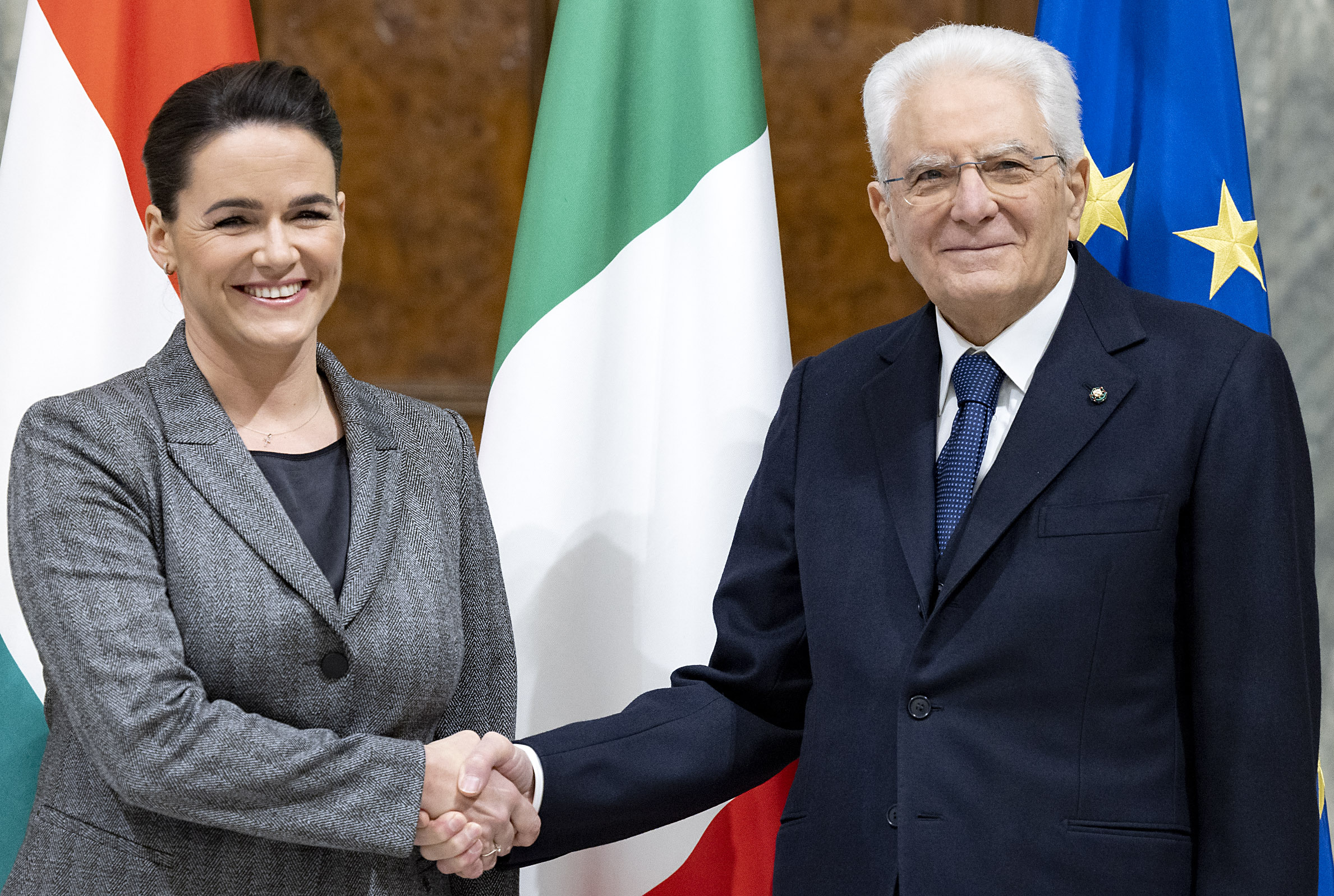
Novák with Italian President Sergio Mattarella in Rome, 31 January 2023

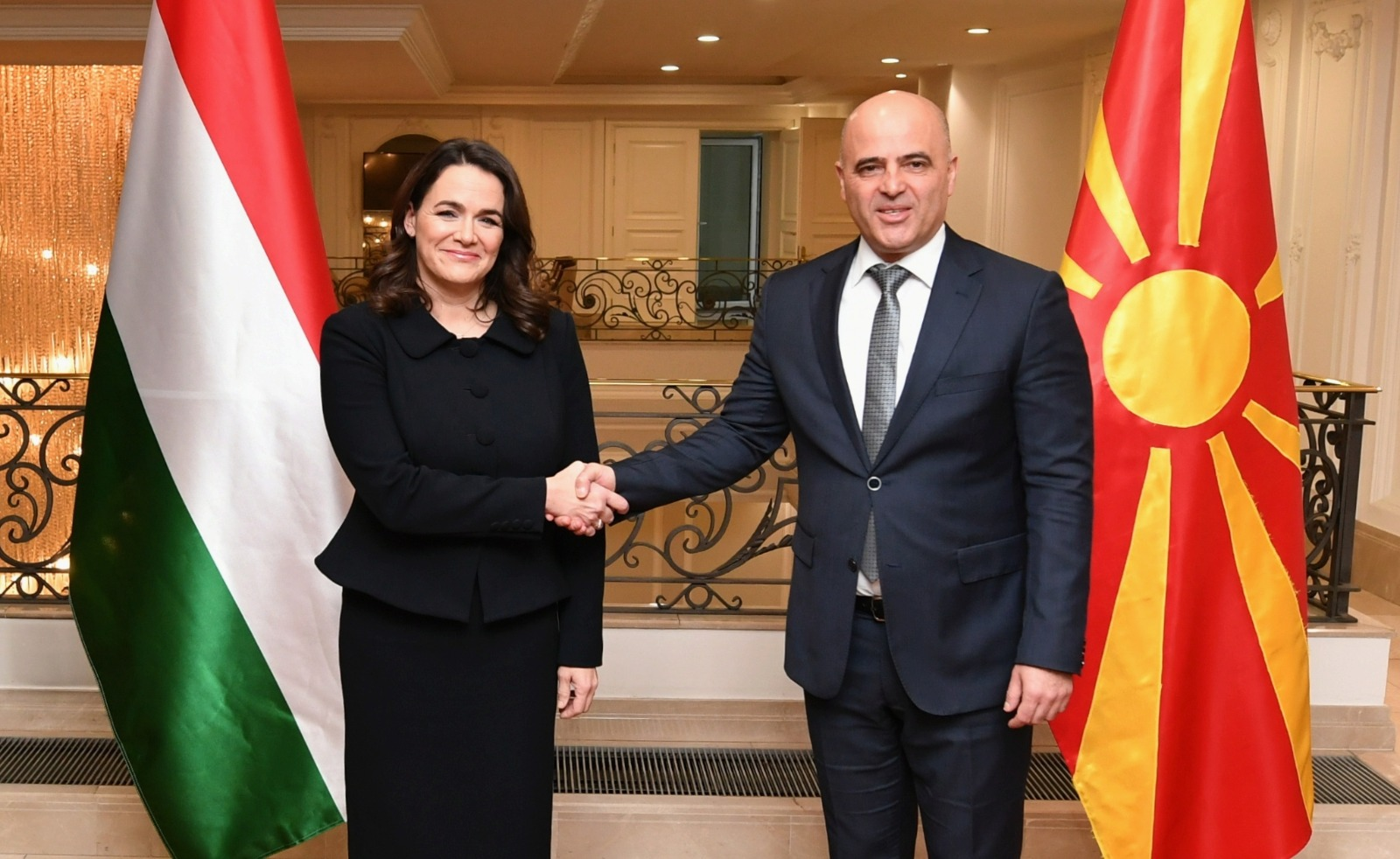
Novák with North Macedonian Prime Minister Dimitar Kovačevski in Skopje, 6 February 2023

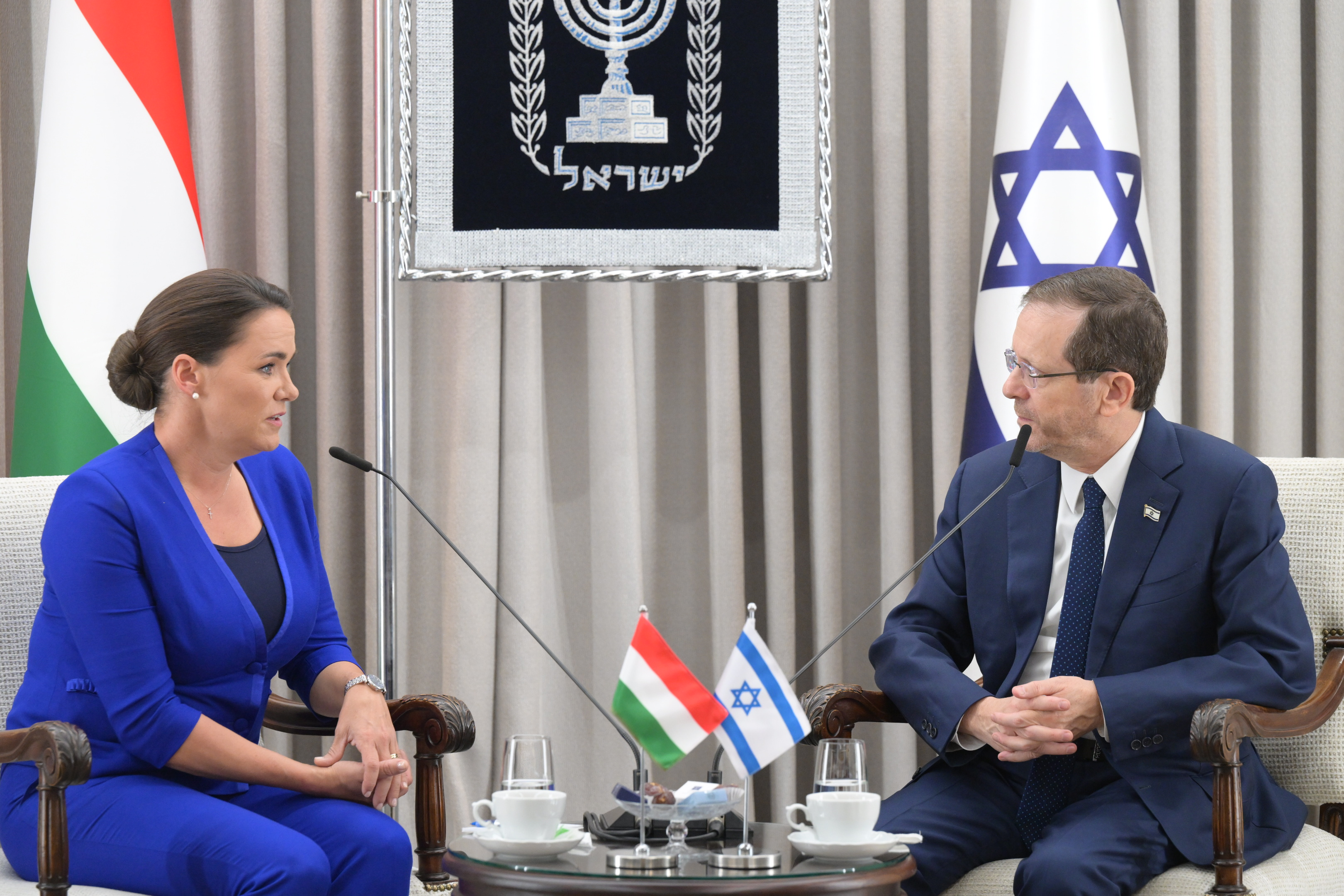
Novák with Israeli President Isaac Herzog in Jerusalem, 5 November 2023

In April 2023, the National Assembly passed a bill enabling and encouraging citizens to report same-sex couples who raise children to the state authorities, such as police and child protection. Novák vetoed the bill, and formally prevented it from becoming enacted into law. In May 2022, she condemned the Russian invasion of Ukraine.

In the context of the 2023 Gaza war, she condemned Hamas' attack on Israel and expressed her support for the latter's right to self-defence. On 5 November 2023, Novák visited Israel to express solidarity with the country.

=== Pardon affair and resignation ===
In April 2023, prior to and in commemoration of Pope Francis's pastoral visit to Hungary, Novák issued a series of presidential pardons, including that of far-right activist and domestic terrorist György Budaházy and Endre Kónya. Kónya had been the deputy director of an orphanage in Bicske who had been convicted of covering up the director's molesting of children at the institution. When Kónya's pardon—later thought to have been issued under pressure from Zoltán Balog, Novák's erstwhile mentor and synodal president of the Hungarian Reformed Church—was made public on 2 February 2024, national controversy ensued, becoming known as the "pardon affair" (Hungarian: kegyelmi ügy). Protests erupted in Budapest demanding Novák's resignation, with commentators viewing the scandal as especially damaging to Fidesz's credibility as a defender of traditional family values.

On 9 February, Novák cut short her attendance at the World Water Polo Championships in Qatar and flew home to Budapest, where she announced her resignation shortly after arriving on 10 February. In her resignation address, she also apologized to Kónya's victims. Judit Varga, who was serving as Minister of Justice in 2023 and had countersigned the pardon, also resigned as a member of parliament and withdrew her candidacy for member of the European Parliament in the 2024 election. In response, Orbán said that he would introduce a constitutional amendment to bar convicted child abusers from receiving clemency. As part of continued fallout from the scandal, Balog resigned from the synodal presidency of the Hungarian Reformed Church on 16 February 2024.

The National Assembly formally accepted, and thus made Novák's resignation effective, on 26 February 2024. She was succeeded in an acting capacity by speaker of the National Assembly László Kövér. She was the second head of state to resign in Hungary's post-communist history after Pál Schmitt, who did so in the wake of a plagiarism scandal in 2012.

== Personal life ==
Novák is married and has three children. Her husband is economist István Veres, director of the Financial Market and Foreign Exchange Market Directorate at the Hungarian National Bank (MNB). She is a Reformed Christian.

Novák is firmly committed to opposing what she calls "gender ideology". She supported a constitutional reform in 2020 to strengthen the ban on adoption by same-sex couples by stating that "the mother is a woman, the father is a man". The amendments also stipulate that single people will only be able to adopt with the express authorization of the minister, to prevent homosexuals from circumventing the ban. In a video published in 2020, she argues that "women must not always compete with men", or "constantly compare themselves with men by having a similar position and salary to them".

== Honours and awards ==
=== Domestic ===
- Hungarian Order of Saint Stephen (2022)
  According to the Constitution of Hungary's CCII/2011 law the president of Hungary receives the Hungarian Order of Saint Stephen ex-officio.
- Grand Cross with Chain of the Hungarian Order of Merit (2022)
  According to the Constitution of Hungary's CCII/2011 law the president of Hungary receives the Grand Cross with Chain of the Hungarian Order of Merit ex-officio.

=== Foreign ===
- France: Knight (Chevalier) of the National Order of the Legion of Honour (2019)
- Poland: Commander's Cross of the Order of Merit of the Republic of Poland (2019)
- Portugal: Grand Collar of the Order of Prince Henry (2023)

=== Dynastic ===
- (Kingdom of the Two Sicilies) House of Bourbon-Two Sicilies: Dame Grand Cross of the Royal Order of Francis I (2023)

== Notes ==
Political offices
New office	Minister for Family Affairs; 2020–2021	Vacant Title next held by Vilmos Kátai-Németh as Minister of Social and Family Affairs
Preceded by János Áder	President of Hungary; 2022–2024	Succeeded by Tamás Sulyok
