= Litvan =

Litvan may refer to:

- György Litván (1929-2006), Hungarian historian and politician
- Litvan, Iran, a village in Golestan Province, Iran
