= Hungarian Society for Urban and Spatial Planning =

Main institute for planning in Hungary

- Abbreviation: MUT
- Formation: 1966; 60 years ago
- Type: Professional body
- Legal status: association
- Purpose: Promoting the activities and profession of planning in Hungary
- Headquarters: 1094 Budapest, Liliom Street 48.
- Region served: Hungary
- Official language: Hungarian
- President: Géza Salamin
- Main organ: presidency
- Affiliations: European Council of Spatial Planners
- Website: www.mut.hu

The Hungarian Society for Urban and Spatial Planning (Hungarian: Magyar Urbanisztikai Társaság, MUT) is the main institute of spatial planning and urban planning in Hungary. Founded in 1966, the society aims to promote the activities and profession of planning in Hungary and is coordinating the activities of all planners across the country. The society organizes annual meetings, most importantly the National Urban Conference (Országos Urbanisztikai Konferencia) and honors leading urbanists, as well as municipalities with remarkable development with its János Hild Award. The organization is a member of the European Council of Spatial Planners.

== Functions ==
- The aim of the Society is to make Hungarian urbanism, consisting of the coordinated activities of many different professions as efficient and effective as possible.
- Exploring new professional knowledge and gathering national and international experience of practice, and sharing it with the membership.
- To define the knowledge and standards required for working as an expert in the field of spatial and urban development, and to regularly review the scope of these standards on the basis of socio-economic and technological trends.
- Improving the conditions for professional practice, developing and promoting theoretical and practical activities, and encouraging the spread of a broad urbanistic approach in Hungary.

== History ==
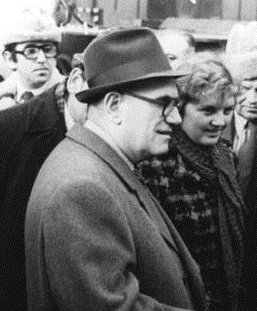
István Sarlós, the first president of the MUT

The leadership of the one-party led socialist Hungary emphasized the significance of the application of modern urban planning principles. This led to the foundation of the Hungarian Society for Urban and Spatial Planning in 1966. The founding members of the society came from a wide range of scientific fields, including demographists, sociologists, architects, transportation specialists, hygienists and politicians. Initially the institution operated under tight political control, its first secretary, István Sarlós was a high ranking communist politician as well: at that time he was the Chairman of the Budapest City Committee, practically the mayor of the capital city. Thanks to the state's financial and political support the MUT quickly grew to become the largest forum of urbanism in Hungary.

After the fall of the socialist regime in Hungary the MUT underwent considerable changes. The society almost completely changed its leadership and at the same time it lost its financial background provided by the state. After a brief crises the MUT restarted its meetings, conferences and it also participated in the new democratic government's adversary council, the National Forum on Urban Issues (Nemzeti Településügyi Fórum), which reviewed newly proposed urbanism-related laws. Besides its regular activities, the leadership of the society occasionally publicly states its stance on controversial projects through resolutions. In a resolution issued in 2024 the MUT called for a number of changes in the government's plans for the transformation of the brownfield territories of Rákosrendező train station to a business centre with high rising buildings.

== Regional groups and professional departments ==
For more efficient work, members of the Hungarian Society for Urban and Spatial Planning can form smaller regional groups (területi csoport) and professional departments (szakmai tagozat) which are focused on the questions of a certain region or planner group. Most counties in Hungary have their own regional group, and there is a wide range of professional departments as well, like the Young Urbanists Department (Fiatal urbanisták tagozat), the Village Department (Falutagozat), the Administration Department (Igazgatási tagozat) the Urban Economics Department (Városgazdasági tagozat) and many more.

== Awards ==
=== János Hild Award ===
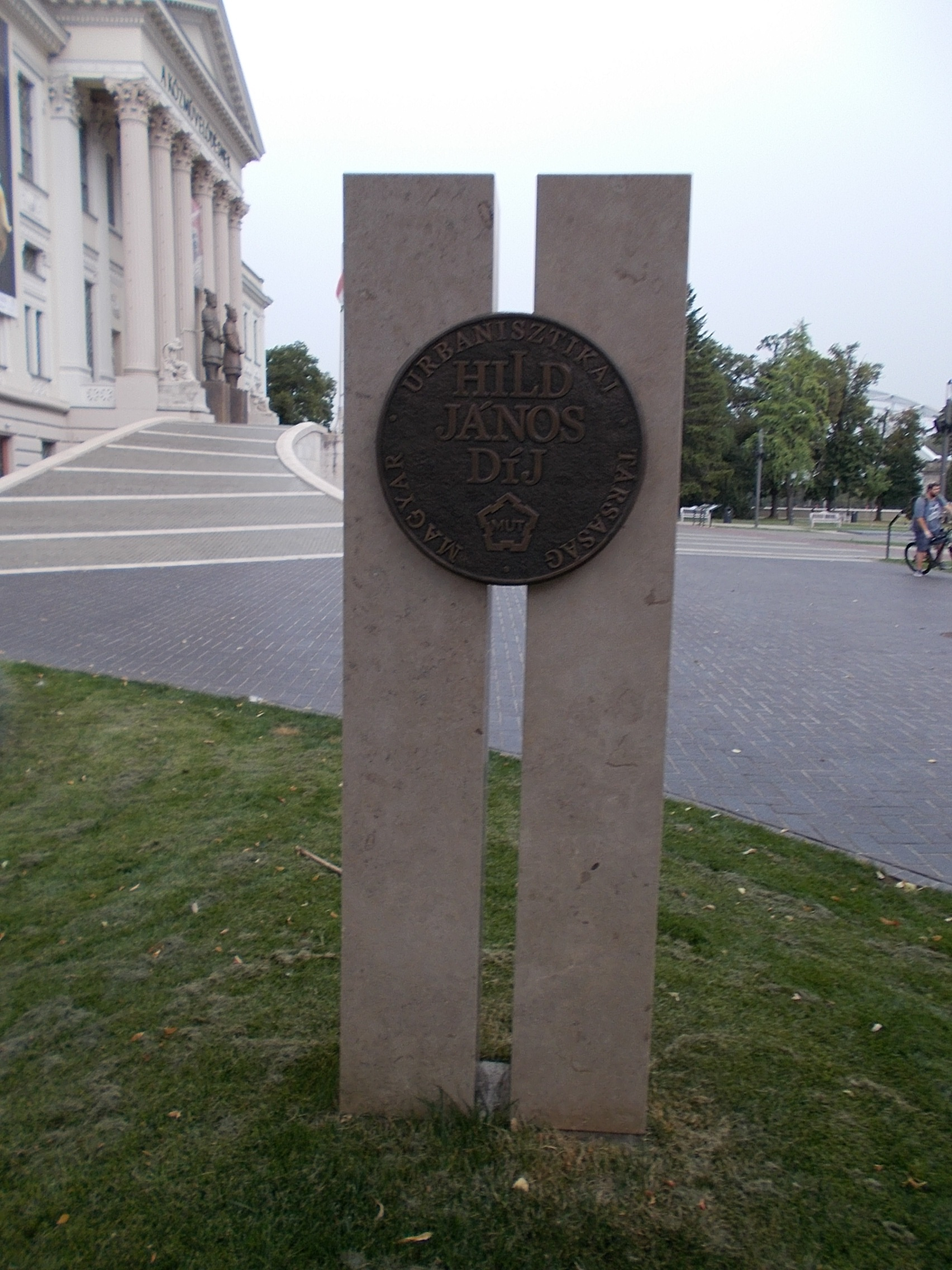
János Hild Award of Szeged, awarded in 2023

Founded in 1968, the most important prize of the Hungarian Society for Urban and Spatial Planning was named after János Hild, one of the first city planners of Hungary. Candidates for the award compete in two main categories: local governments of towns, villages and the districts of the capital city can be awarded for a longer-term development process of their settlement with the application of the principles of modern urbanism. Winner municipalities erect a statue usually featuring the enlarged version of the award. Besides municipalities, individuals are awarded as well, for outstanding professional, scientific, educational, or social work in the fields of spatial planning, urban planning, urban development, and urban rehabilitation.

=== Other awards ===
- Award of Excellency for the Revitalization of Public Places (Köztérmegújítási Nívódíj): In cooperation with the International Council on Monuments and Sites (ICOMOS) the MUT created an annually distributed award in 2009, to recognize successful rehabilitation programs of public parks, squares, streets and other important public spaces. Projects for the renovation of the main square of a town and programs for rehabilitating residential areas are competing in two different categories.
- Gábor Barna Medallion (Barna Gábor emlékérem): Named after the fourth secretary of the MUT, Gábor Barna the medallion is awarded to members and associates of the Society since 2000.
- Degree Award (Diplomadíj): University students studying sciences related to urbanism can apply with their bachelor's diploma thesis or with their master's thesis to win the award.

== National Urbanist Conference ==
The most important annual event of the MUT is the National Urbanist Conference (Országos Urbanisztikai Konferencia), where representatives of the different fields of urban and spatial planning can meet in person and discuss current questions and challenges of urbanism in Hungary. First held in 1963 with about 600 researchers, the event was originally named National City-building Meeting (Országos Városépítési Tanácskozás), the name of the conference was later changed after the collapse of the socialist regime. After 1994 the first six conferences took place in Siófok, later the location was moved to a new town every year.

In 2023 the 29. National Urbanist Conference took place in the Moholy-Nagy University of Art and Design, where about 230 guests, as well as 80 round table participants and presenters gathered. The title of the conference was Who is developing the city? - Interests, conflicts and cooperation in spatial and urban development. Prominent political figures like Gergely Karácsony, mayor of Budapest and State Secretary Gábor Mayer participated as presenters as well.

== Leadership ==
=== List of secretaries and presidents ===
- István Sarlós (1966–1978)
- József Bondor (1978–1985)
- János Szabó (1985–1989)
- Gábor Paksy (1989–1997)
- Gábor Aczél (1997–2012)
- Imre Körmendy (2012–2018)
- Géza Salamin (2018–)

=== Current presidency (2021-2024) ===
- President:
  - Géza Salamin
- Vice Presidents:
  - Ders Csaba
  - János Kocsis
- Members of the Presidency:
  - Gábor Balás
  - Szabolcs Bérczi
  - Ádám Bodor
  - Zoltán Dorogi
  - Lea Kőszeghy
  - Péter Szaló

== International affiliation ==
Since 1994 the MUT is a full member of the European Council of Spatial Planners, which is the umbrella organization for spatial planning institutes in Europe.
