= Óbudai cemetery =

Cemetery in Budapest

- Óbudai temető
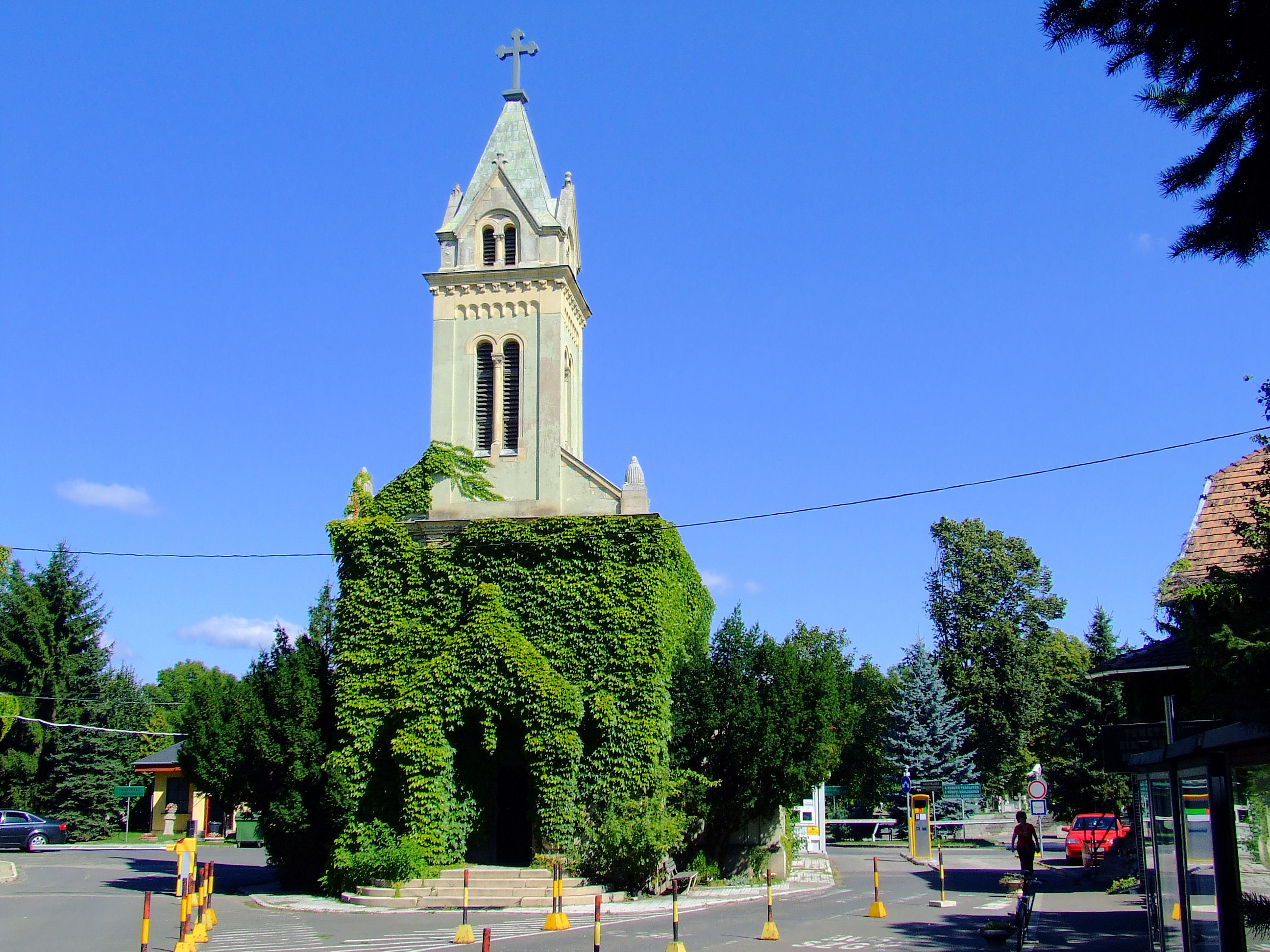
- Interactive map of Óbudai cemetery

Details
- Established: 1910
- Location: Budapest
- Country: Hungary
- Coordinates: 47.569722°N 19.0225°E
- Size: 25.4 hectares (63 acres)

Óbudai cemetery (Hungarian: Óbudai temető) is a cemetery in Óbuda-Békásmegyer, the 3rd district of Budapest. It lies at the foot of Arany-hegy and Testvér-hegy. It was opened in 1910 and in 1922 the Óbuda Jewish Cemetery was added.

The cemetery is bordered by Bécsi út, Pomázi út, and the river Aranyhegyi-Patak. Its area is 25.4 hectares (63 acres).

== Notable interments ==
- Flórián Albert
- Árpád Göncz
