= Antal Apró =

Hungarian politician (1913–1994)

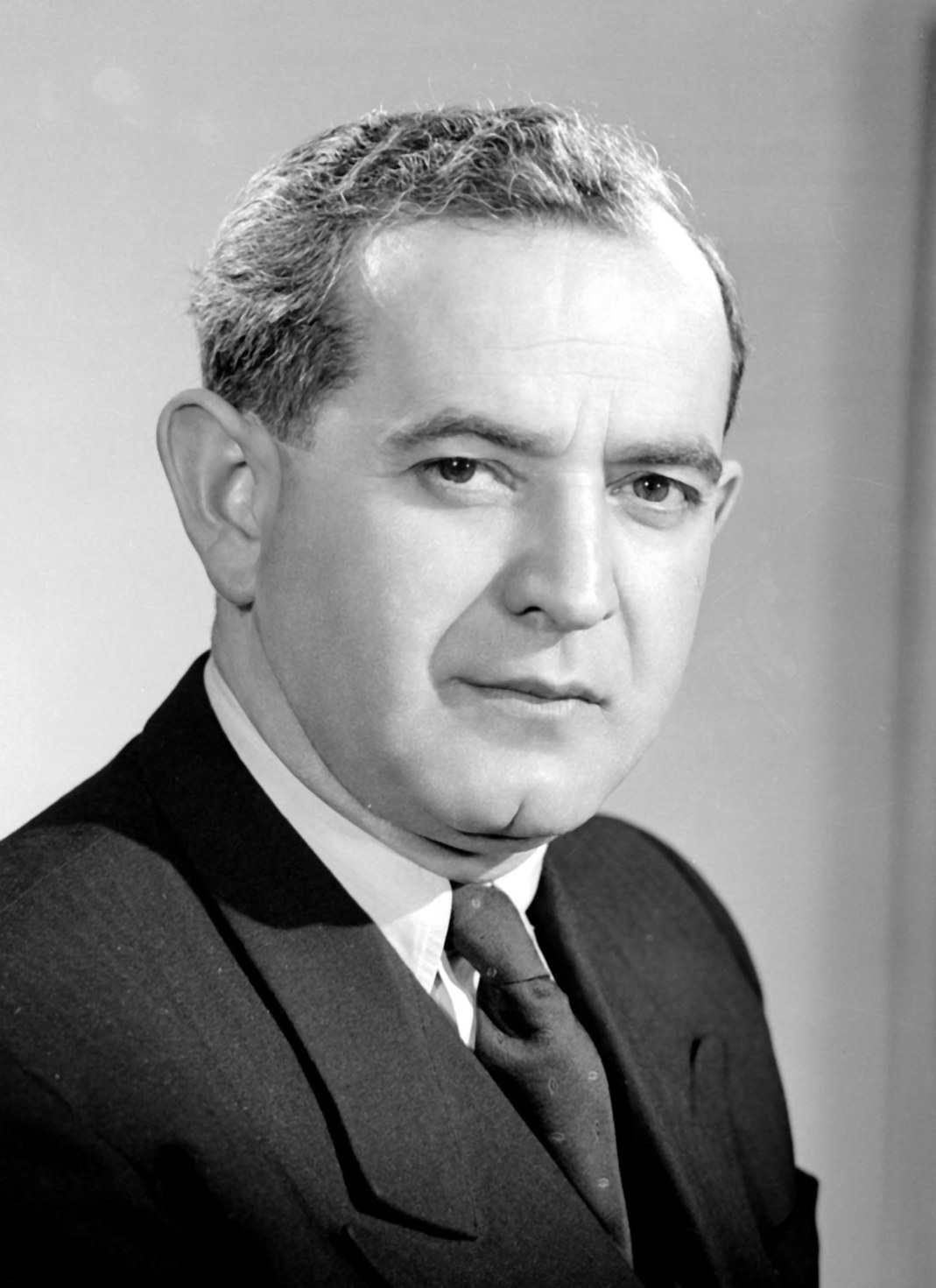
- Apró in 1948

Speaker of the National Assembly of Hungary
- In office 12 May 1971 – 19 December 1984
- Preceded by: Gyula Kállai
- Succeeded by: István Sarlós

Personal details
- Born: 8 February 1913; Szeged, Csongrád County, Kingdom of Hungary, Austria-Hungary
- Died: 9 December 1994 (aged 81); Budapest, Hungary
- Political party: MKP, MDP, MSZMP
- Spouse: Klára Kovács
- Children: Antal; János; Anna Piroska
- Relatives: Klára Dobrev (granddaughter)
- Profession: politician

Antal Apró (8 February 1913 – 9 December 1994) was a Hungarian Communist politician, who served as Speaker of the National Assembly of Hungary between 1971 and 1984.

== Early life ==
Born in Szeged, Apró was brought up in orphanages. He arrived in Makó in 1916, where he completed an elementary education. He then went to work as a house-painter in Budapest. He became a member of the Mémosz in 1930 and of the Hungarian Communist Party in 1931. In 1935, he was among the organizers of a building-workers' strike and active in the United Trade-Union Opposition. He was elected to the national board of Mémosz in 1938. Apró was arrested and interned several times for his illegal activity. In September 1944, he joined the Central Committee of the Peace Party, in charge of obtaining the weapons required for resistance.

== Political career ==
On 22 January 1945 Apró became head of the trade-union department at the Hungarian Communist Party, moving to head the Mass Organizations and Mass Labour Department in February and the newly formed Trade-Union Committee of the Central Committee on 13 April 1945. Apró was elected an alternate member of the party Central Committee in May 1946 and later a full member, joining the executive Organizing Committee of the party in October. In 1948, he was a member of the Joint Organizing Committee of the Hungarian Communist Party and the Hungarian Social Democratic Party. Meanwhile, in 1945, he had been elected to Parliament. Apró was dropped from the highest level of party leadership between 1948 and 1951, but elected general secretary of the Trade-Union Council. He was criticized by Rákosi and Gerő in this period for "syndicalism". From August 1949 to early January 1952 and again from July to November 1953, Apró was also a member of the Presidential Council. He was appointed minister of the construction-materials industry at the beginning of 1952 and first deputy to the minister of construction in July 1953. In November of that year, he returned to the Political Committee of the Hungarian Working People's Party (MDP) and became a deputy prime minister. Apró served on the committee implementing the resolution on rehabilitating unjustly condemned party members, and from March 1955, on the committee dealing with the rehabilitation of the victims of show trials.

Until 1971, he was Hungary's permanent representative on the council of Comecon. On 16 June 1956 he was elected chairman of the National Council of the Patriotic People's Front. On 6 October 1956 he delivered an address at the funeral of László Rajk. He was elected a member of the Military Committee of the MDP Central Committee on the night of 23 October. On 27 October he became a deputy prime minister and construction minister in the national government of Imre Nagy. The following day he joined the presidium formed to direct the party. However, he fled to the Tököl headquarters of the Soviet forces, from where he was taken to Szolnok. On 4 November he was given the industrial portfolio in the Kádár government. On 7 November he became a member of the Provisional Executive Committee of the Kádárite HSWP, heading its Economic Committee from December.

Appointed a deputy prime minister again on 9 May 1957, Apró was first deputy prime minister between the end of January 1958 and September 1961. In 1961, he was placed at the head of the government's Committee for International Relations. He was the Hungarian signatory to the agreement on building the Friendship I oil pipeline from the Soviet Union and to the documents on the nuclear-power programme. On 12 May 1971 Apró was relieved of all the posts he had held and chosen as speaker of Parliament, which he remained until December 1984. Between 1976 and 1989, he was president of the Hungarian-Soviet Friendship Society. He was dropped from the HSWP Political Committee in 1980, and at the party meeting in May 1988, from the Central Committee. On 8 May 1989 he resigned his parliamentary seat and retired from politics.

== Family ==
He was an extra-marital child of Piroska Apró, a 19-year-old Roman Catholic cook. Antal Apró married to Klára Kovács, they had three children: Antal, János and Piroska. Their only daughter Piroska Apró is an economist. She was the wife of the Bulgarian Petar Dobrev. They have a child, Klára Dobrev, member of the European Parliament and the wife of former Hungarian Prime Minister Ferenc Gyurcsány.

Political offices
Preceded by Gyula Kállai	Speaker of the National Assembly; 1971–1984	Succeeded by István Sarlós
