= Mátyás Szűrös =

Hungarian politician

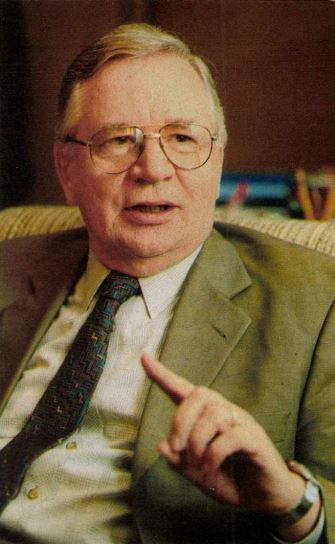
- Szűrös in 2001

Provisional President of Hungary
- In office 23 October 1989 – 2 May 1990
- Prime Minister: Miklós Németh
- Preceded by: Brunó Ferenc Straub (as Chairman of the Presidential Council of Hungary)
- Succeeded by: Árpád Göncz

Speaker of the National Assembly
- In office 10 March 1989 – 23 October 1989
- Preceded by: István Stadinger
- Succeeded by: István Fodor (acting) Árpád Göncz

Personal details
- Born: 11 September 1933 (age 92) Püspökladány, Hungary
- Party: MDP (1951–1956); MSZMP (1956–1989); MSZP (1989–2002); New Left Party (2002–2003); SZDP (2003–2013)
- Spouse: Andrea Takács
- Children: 3

Mátyás Szűrös (Note: Hungarian pronunciation: [ˈmaːcaːʃ ˈsyːrøʃ]) (born 11 September 1933) is a Hungarian politician. He served as provisional president of the Republic from 23 October 1989 to 2 May 1990. His presidency occurred during Hungary's transition from Communism to democratic government.

== Biography ==
Szűrös served as Speaker of the National Assembly of Hungary from March 1989 to May 1990. In the fall of 1989, as part of an agreement between the Communists and the opposition to establish multiparty democracy, the 1949 Constitution was almost completely rewritten to remove its Communist character. The Presidential Council, the country's Communist-era collective presidency, was dissolved. Under the Constitution, Szűrös became provisional president until the election. Soon after taking office on 23 October he made the official proclamation that Hungary had removed the "People's Republic" from its constitutional name and was now the "Republic of Hungary."

Szűrös remained in parliament until 2002 as a member of the Hungarian Socialist Party, often voting against the party consensus. He quit the party, in 2002, joined the newly established New Left Party and ran as their prime minister candidate at the parliamentary elections, but the party only got 0.1% of the popular vote. In 2003, he joined the Social Democratic Party and was later elected chairman of the party. He resigned his position in 2005.

Political offices
Preceded by István Stadinger	Speaker of the National Assembly; 1989–1990	Succeeded by István Fodor
Preceded by Brunó Ferenc Straub; Chairman of the Presidential Council	Provisional President of Hungary; 1989–1990	Succeeded by Árpád Göncz
