= István Fodor =

Hungarian politician

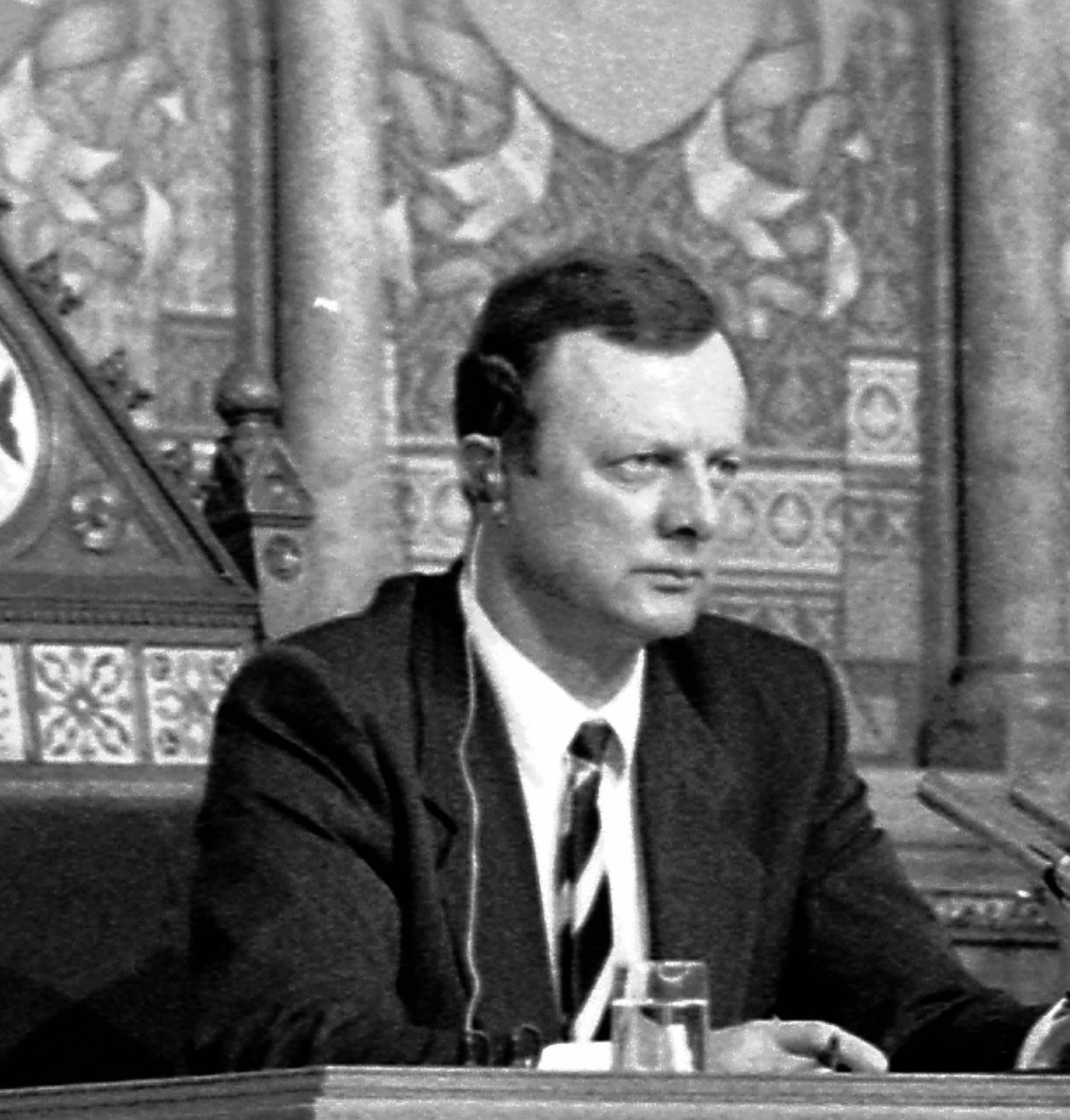

Speaker of the National Assembly of Hungary Acting
- In office 23 October 1989 – 2 May 1990
- Preceded by: Mátyás Szűrös
- Succeeded by: Árpád Göncz

Personal details
- Born: 2 March 1945 (age 80) Csepreg, Kingdom of Hungary
- Party: independent
- Spouse: Gabriella Szécsényi
- Children: Enikő; Gabriella
- Profession: politician

István Fodor (born 2 March 1945) is a former Hungarian politician, who served as Speaker of the National Assembly of Hungary between 1989 and 1990. The Third Hungarian Republic was established on 23 October 1989 and the legislative speaker Mátyás Szűrös became Provisional President of Hungary. Fodor was appointed Speaker besides Szűrös.

After the 1990 elections he became an independent representative in the new National Assembly. He was the chairman of the Alliance of the Hungarian Resistants and Antifascists from 1999 to 2000.

Political offices
Preceded by Mátyás Szűrös	Speaker of the National Assembly; 1989–1990; Served alongside: Mátyás Szűrös	Succeeded by Árpád Göncz
