= István Stadinger =

Hungarian politician (born 1927)

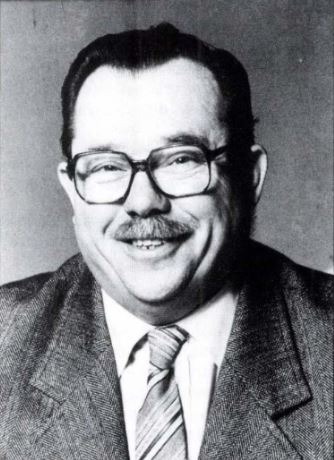
- István Stadinger, photo taken by László Csigó in 1984

Speaker of the National Assembly
- In office 29 June 1988 – 10 March 1989
- Preceded by: István Sarlós
- Succeeded by: Mátyás Szűrös

Personal details
- Born: 27 January 1927; Keszthely, Kingdom of Hungary
- Died: 26 January 2018 (aged 90)
- Political party: SZDP, MDP, MSZMP
- Spouse: Helén Antos
- Children: Zsuzsanna; István
- Profession: politician

István Stadinger (27 January 1927 – 26 January 2018) was a Hungarian communist politician, who served as Speaker of the National Assembly of Hungary between 1988 and 1989, until his resignation. He retired from the politics after 1990.

== Early life ==
István Stadinger was born into a working-class family in Keszthely as the son of locomotive heater fireman József Stadinger and housewife Anna Szabó. After finishing elementary school, Stadinger started working as an aircraft mechanic student in the plant of the Sport Flying Association of the University of Technology in Pesterzsébet and Ferihegy. He worked in this profession until 1945.

== Political career ==
After the end of World War II, Stadinger joined the re-formed Social Democratic Party (SZDP) in April 1945. He was entrusted to organize a youth branch of the party in his birthplace Keszthely. Shortly, he became head of the Keszthely branch of the youth organization Social Democratic Youth Movement (SZIM), then the parent party itself in the same town. He led the party branch in Nagykanizsa District since early 1946, then he was appointed secretary of the Zala County branch. He actively supported the merger of SZDP and the Soviet-backed Hungarian Working People's Party (MDP) in 1948. He became a member of the Zala County Committee of the latter party thereafter, where he also functioned as an organizing secretary. From the autumn of 1949, he became the organizing secretary of the Baranya County Committee of the MDP. He was a member of the Baranya County Council.

From April 1951, Stadinger held economic positions. Between 1951 and 1954 he was the director of the Gas Generating Equipment Factory, from 15 July 1954 to September 1956 the Agricultural Machinery Factory of Törökszentmiklós, then until February 1957 he was the director of the Mill Machinery Factory, and from 1957 the Agricultural Machinery Factory of Budapest. From 1 February 1962 to 31 October 1978, he was the CEO of Metropolitan Gas Works (Fővárosi Gázművek) in Budapest. Meanwhile he also obtained a degree at the Karl Marx University of Economic Sciences.

Stadinger served as Deputy Chairman of the Council of Budapest from 14 October 1978 to 1 January 1988. His portfolio included oversight of utilities, transportation, and urban architecture. He was General Deputy Chairman from 1 January to 29 June 1988. Between 1983 and January 1987, he was also the president of the Budapest City Beautification Association. He also served as president of the Budapest Sports Association (BSE) from 26 March 1979 to 16 March 1985. From 15 March 1988, he was the chairman of the judging committee of the new National Theatre's design tender.

Beside his party and social assignments in Budapest, Stadinger was elected into the National Assembly in the 1980 parliamentary election, representing Óbuda (6th constituency, Budapest). He was re-elected in the 1985 parliamentary election. He was Secretary of the Committee on Industry from 27 June 1980, Chairman of the Committee on Construction and Transport in the 1985 term from 28 June 1985 to 29 June 1988, then ordinary member from 27 June 1989 to 2 May 1990. Stadinger was elected Speaker of the National Assembly with 129 votes against. He served in this capacity between 29 June 1988 and 10 March 1989. Amid the transition to democracy, he represented a hard-line Communist standpoint, who strongly opposed reform efforts. He resigned from his position. He justified his decision on the grounds that Parliament's work had accelerated and that a younger Member was needed to organize it. He retired from politics after the fall of Communist system.

== Personal life ==
Stadinger married civil servant Helén Antos. Their marriage produced two children, physician Zsuzsanna and engineer István.

Political offices
Preceded by István Sarlós	Speaker of the National Assembly; 1988–1989	Succeeded by Mátyás Szűrös
