= Imre Mécs =

Hungarian politician (1933–2023)

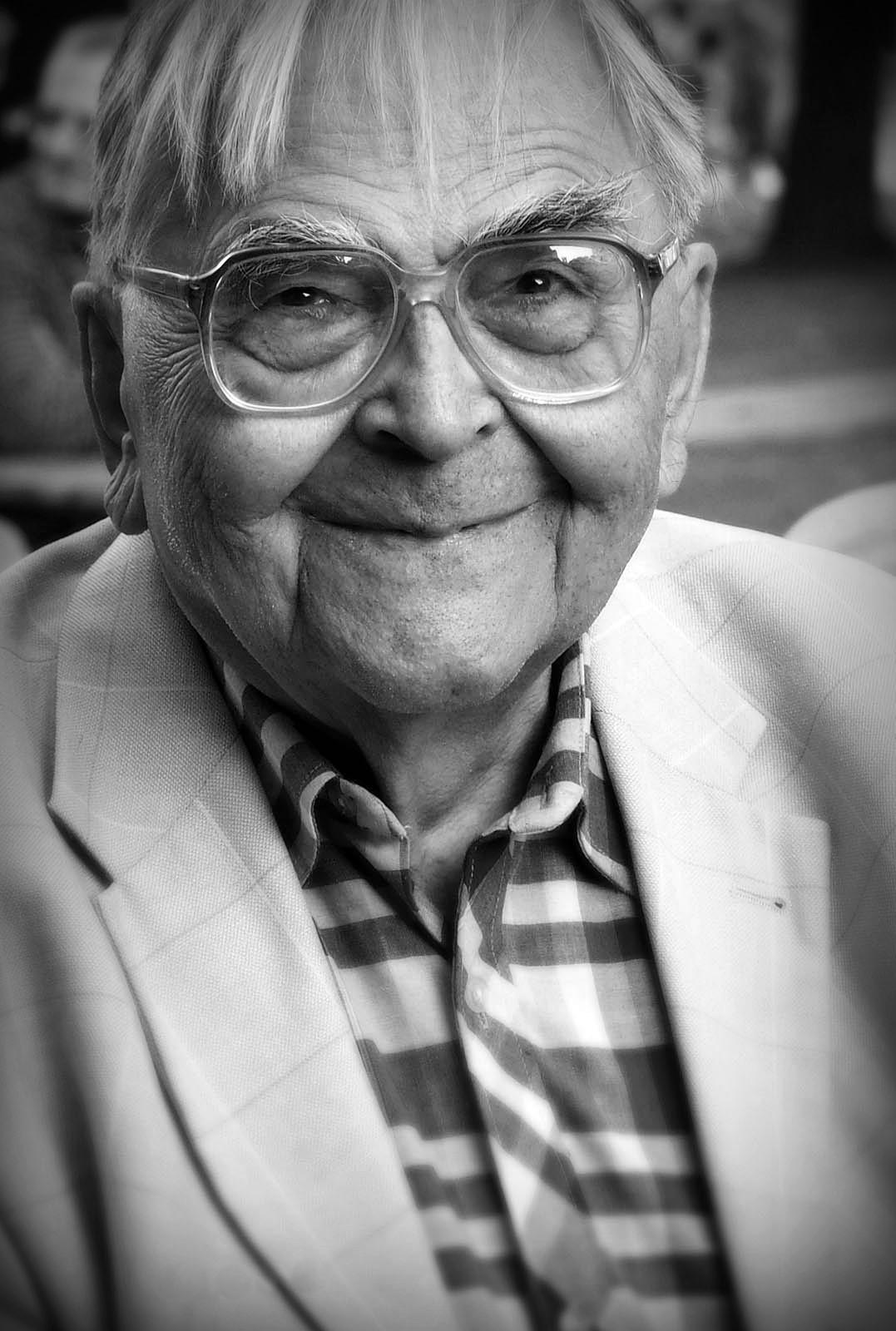
- Born: 4 September 1933; Budapest, Hungary
- Died: 19 January 2023 (aged 89); Budapest, Hungary
- Political party: SZDSZ
- Spouses: Fruzsina Magyar (m. 1985)
- Children: 8
- Mother: Irén Klára Lengyel

Imre Mécs (4 September 1933 – 19 January 2023) was a Hungarian politician. Following the Hungarian Revolution of 1956, he was sentenced to death, then his sentence was mitigated to a prison sentence. He was released in 1963 and worked as an electrical engineer. Later he became a founding member of the Alliance of Free Democrats (SZDSZ). He was elected on the SZDSZ party ticket to the Hungarian Parliament in 1990 and served several consecutive terms. Over differences with his party, he quit SZDSZ and was elected on the Hungarian Socialist Party (MSZP) ticket (but not a member of) in 2006. He did not manage to win a seat in the 2010 elections, ending his parliamentary career. In January 2011 he rejoined his old party, SZDSZ.

From 1994 to 1998 he was the chairman of the parliamentary committee of national defense. Until 1996 he was one of SZDSZ's leaders (ügyvivő) and he also ran for the position of SZDSZ party chairman, but his candidacy was unsuccessful. He came into some conflict with SZDSZ over the 2005 presidential election. Most of SZDSZ decided to abstain while Mécs voted for MSZP nominee Katalin Szili. Because of this vote he was later accused of disloyalty towards SZDSZ. In 2010 Mécs proposed a small change to the constitution, which still at that time referred to "the party", implying one party rule, as before the End of Communism in Hungary.

== Personal life and death ==
Mécs was married twice. His second wife (since 1985) was Fruzsina Magyar. He had eight children from his two marriages - two daughters, Mónika and Anna and six sons, Imre, László, Máté, Bálint, János and Dávid.

Mécs died on 19 January 2023, at the age of 89.
