= István Sarlós =

Hungarian politician (1921–2006)

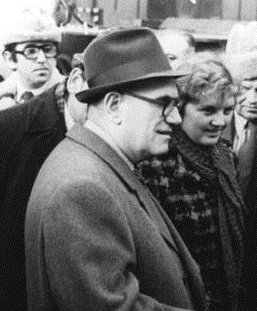
- Sarlós in Erfurt in 1976

Speaker of the National Assembly of Hungary
- In office 19 December 1984 – 29 June 1988
- Preceded by: Antal Apró
- Succeeded by: István Stadinger

Personal details
- Born: 30 October 1921 Budapest, Kingdom of Hungary
- Died: 19 June 2006 (aged 84) Budapest, Hungary
- Party: SZDP, MDP, MSZMP
- Profession: Politician

István Sarlós (30 October 1921 – 19 June 2006) was a Hungarian politician, who served as Speaker of the National Assembly of Hungary between 1984 and 1988.

Sarlós was born in Budapest. His parents (István Scheithauer, later Sarlós and Erzsébet Till) were members of the Social Democratic Party and had been since 1922. His father was deported by members of the Arrow Cross Party because of his participation in the rebel movements. He died in the Dachau concentration camp in 1944. Sarlós' brother, Ferenc, held the position of Chief of the Budapest District XVII (Rákosmente) Police.

He became a member of the National Assembly of Hungary in 1963, and remained a member until 1990. In 1966 Sarlós was appointed member of the Central Committee of the Hungarian Socialist Workers' Party. He also held the position of deputy chairman of the National Council of the Patriotic People's Front. He was the chief editor of the newspaper Népszabadság between 1970 and 1974. From 1974 to 1982 he served as general secretary of the National Council of the Patriotic People's Front. He became a member of the communist party's Political Committee as well.

Between 1982 and 1984 Sarlós served as Deputy Chairman of the Council of Ministers of the People's Republic of Hungary. Afterwards, he was appointed legislative speaker. He resigned in 1988 and became Deputy Chairman of the Hungarian Presidential Council. Sarlós retired from the politics after the end of Communism, and died on 19 June 2006 at the age of 84.

Political offices
Preceded by Antal Apró	Speaker of the National Assembly; 1984–1988	Succeeded by István Stadinger
