= György Litván =

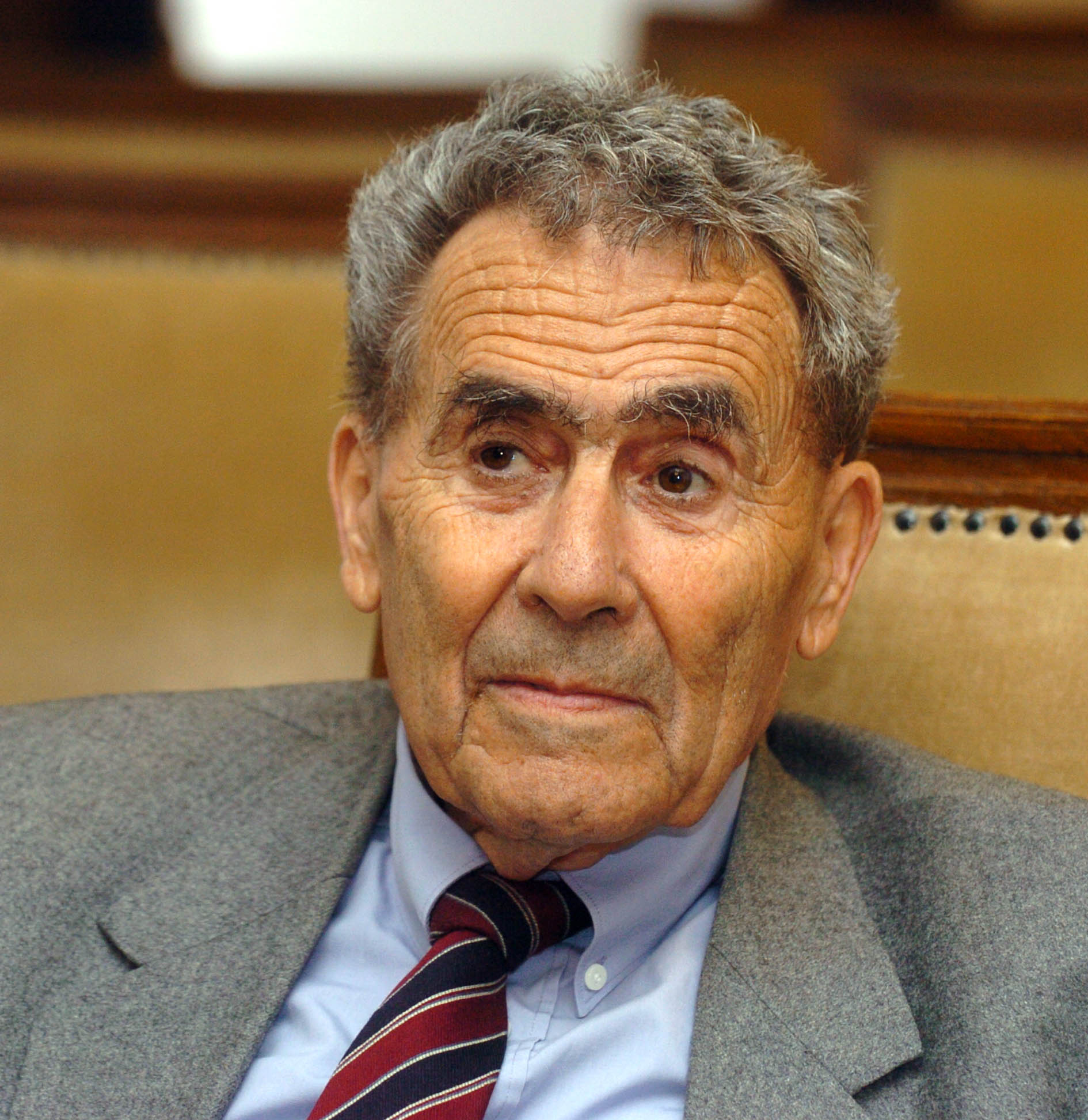
György Litván

György Litván (19 February 1929 in Budapest – 8 November 2006 in Budapest) was a Hungarian historian, politician, political activist, and Senior Official during the 1956 Hungarian Revolution.

== Early life ==
György Litván was born on 19 February 1929, into an educated middle-class Hungarian-Jewish family. His father, Joseph Litván (Litván, József) took part in the Chrysanthemum Revolution of 1918-1919, as a radical left-winger. During World War Two his father was force-marched to the Mauthausen concentration camp, while he and the rest of his family were taken to various other camps. Although he, his father and several other members of his family survived The Holocaust, his mother did not. His father would later marry the daughter (Agnes Fenyő) of the brother of a close friend (Miksa Fenyő).

== Studies and early career ==
Between 1946 and 1950, Litván studied Political History Economics at the Peter Pazmany University of Budapest. He then served two years (1950–1952) of mandatory service as a soldier in the Hungarian army, after which he worked, until 1957, as a teacher at a vocational high school, where he was also Assistant Principal.

== Political activity ==
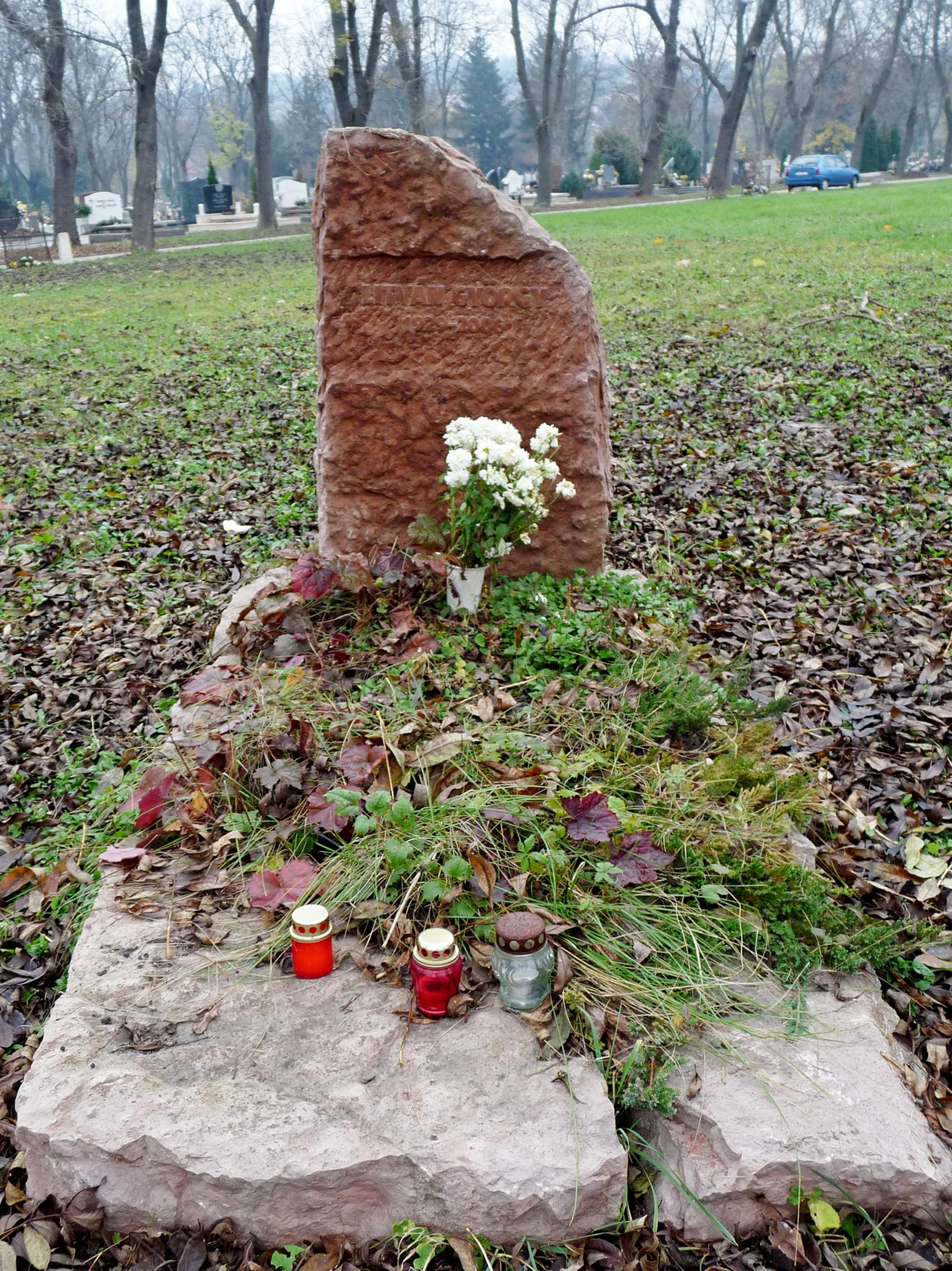
György Litván grave

Between 1947 and 1956 he was a member of The Hungarian Communist Party and then, for a short time, he joined the underground Hungarian Democratic Party, where he was quite involved in teaching party politics. In 1954 he joined the opposition Hungarian Democratic Party of Imre Nagy.

On 23 March 1956, at the party's meeting in the 13th District of Budapest, he was the first person to openly demand that Mátyás Rákosi be removed from power. He was very involved in the work of the Petofi Circle, a literary discussion group of young communists, and during the Hungarian Revolution of 1956 he was a member of 12th District's National Council of Intellectuals of the Hungarian Revolutionary Council. After the revolution was defeated he was instrumental in the founding of The Hungarian Democratic Independence Movement, and shortly thereafter he was sentenced in 1959 by The Supreme People's court to six years imprisonment without the possibility of parole for his part in the distribution of a political pamphlet.

In 1962 he was released from prison and between 1963 and 1971 he worked again as a high school teacher and high school library librarian, whereafter he was offered a minor job at as a Historian at the Hungarian Science Academy's Institute of Historical Research. In 1973 he established himself as a serious Historical Researcher with the publication of his first book titled "The First Workshop of Hungarian Sociology".

In 1988 he became a member of the Council for Restitution of Historic Crimes and was a founding member of the Hungarian liberal party The Alliance of Free Democrats SZDSZ. From 1995 to 1999 he taught at the Institute of Sociology of the University of Budapest (ELTE) and was also President of the Austro-Hungarian Action Foundation.

After the change of regime in Hungary in 1989 he won various academic prizes. His specific areas of interest were concerning the social and political attitudes and movements of the early 20th Century in Hungary, the political, diplomatic and military factors that led to The Treaty of Trianon (which annexed large portions of Hungary to neighboring countries), as well as the general history of the world since World War Two.

== Works ==
- with János M. Bak: Az 1956-os magyar forradalom : reform, felkelés, szabadságharc, megtorlás: tőrténelmi olvasókőnyv. Budapest: Tankőnyvkiadó, 1991. Translated into German as Die Ungarische Revolution 1956: Reform, Aufstand, Vergeltung. Wien: Passagen Verlag, 1994.
- A Twentieth-Century Prophet: Oscar Jászi 1875-1957. Budapest: Central European University Press, 2006

== Relevant links ==
- An Obituary in The Guardian.
- Hungarian Wikipedia Entry.
- Litván György Jászi-monográfiájáról
