= Vásárosnamény District =

Coordinates: 48.1833°N 22.3500°E

Vásárosnamény District Vásárosnaményi járás
- Districts of Hungary
- Coat of arms

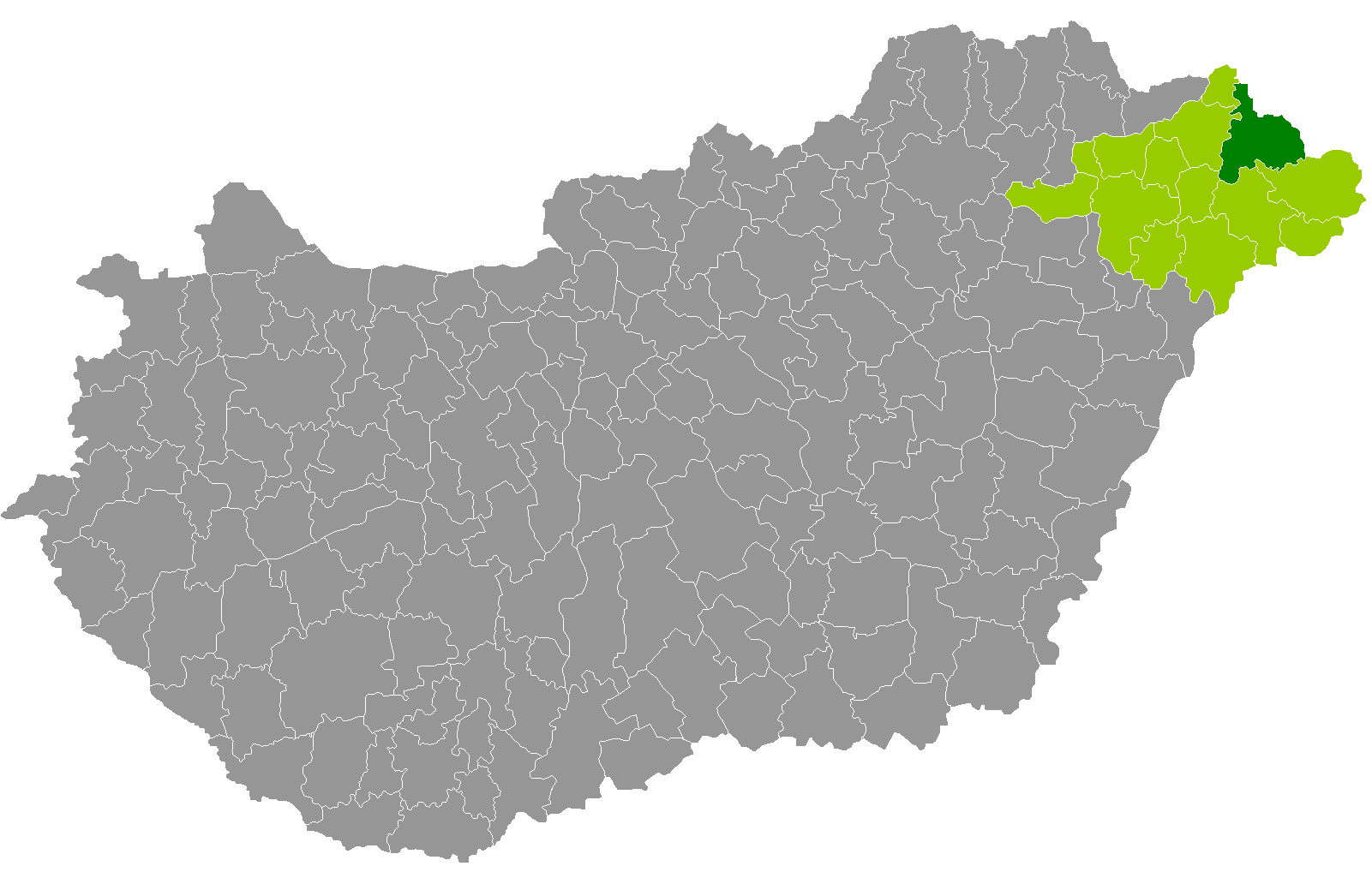
- Vásárosnamény District within Hungary and Szabolcs-Szatmár-Bereg County.
- Country: Hungary
- County: Szabolcs-Szatmár-Bereg
- District seat: Vásárosnamény

Area
  - Total: 617.94 km^{2} (238.59 sq mi)
  - Rank: 5th in Szabolcs-Szatmár-Bereg

Population (2011 census)
  - Total: 35,323
  - Rank: 6th in Szabolcs-Szatmár-Bereg
  - Density: 57/km^{2} (150/sq mi)

Vásárosnamény (Hungarian: Vásárosnaményi járás) is a district in north-eastern part of Szabolcs-Szatmár-Bereg County. Vásárosnamény is also the name of the town where the district seat is found. The district is located in the Northern Great Plain Statistical Region. This district is a part of Nyírség and Bereg geographical and historical region.

== Geography ==
Vásárosnamény District borders with the Ukrainian oblast of Zakarpattia to the northeast, Fehérgyarmat District and Mátészalka District to the south, Baktalórántháza District, Kisvárda District and Záhony District to the west. The number of the inhabited places in Vásárosnamény District is 28.

== Municipalities ==
The district has 2 towns, 1 large village and 25 villages. (ordered by population, as of 1 January 2013)

- Aranyosapáti (2,041)
- Barabás (846)
- Beregdaróc (842)
- Beregsurány (631)
- Csaroda (580)
- Gelénes (569)
- Gemzse (846)
- Gulács (870)
- Gyüre (1,200)
- Hetefejércse (316)
- Ilk (1,237)
- Jánd (747)
- Kisvarsány (1,035)
- Lónya (772)
- Márokpapi (470)
- Mátyus (261)
- Nagyvarsány (1,484)
- **Nyírmada** (4,284)
- Olcsva (648)
- Pusztadobos (1,455)
- Tákos (357)
- Tarpa (2,164)
- Tiszaadony (664)
- Tiszakerecseny (970)
- Tiszaszalka (866)
- Tiszavid (524)
- Vámosatya (578)
- **Vásárosnamény** (8,831) – district seat

The bolded municipalities are cities, italics municipality is large village.

== Demographics ==
Religion in Vásárosnamény District (2011 census)
1. Calvinism (56.2%)
2. Catholic Church (13.5%)
3. Greek Catholicism (6.60%)
4. Other religions (2.80%)
5. Non-religious (4.50%)
6. Atheists (0.20%)
7. Undeclared (16.2%)

In 2011, it had a population of 35,323 and the population density was 57/km^{2}.

| Year | County population | Change |
|---|---|---|
| 2011 | 35,323 | n/a |

=== Ethnicity ===
Besides the Hungarian majority, the main minorities are the Roma (approx. 5,000) and Ukrainian (150).

Total population (2011 census): 35,323
Ethnic groups (2011 census): Identified themselves: 36,652 persons:

- Hungarians: 31,560 (86.11%)
- Gypsies: 4,701 (12.83%)
- Others and indefinable: 391 (1.07%)

Approx. 1,500 persons in Vásárosnamény District did declare more than one ethnic group at the 2011 census.

=== Religion ===
Religious adherence in the county according to 2011 census:

- Reformed – 19,834;
- Catholic – 7,111 (Roman Catholic – 4,775; Greek Catholic – 2,336);
- other religions – 1,006;
- Non-religious – 1,576;
- Atheism – 63;
- Undeclared – 5,733.

== Gallery ==
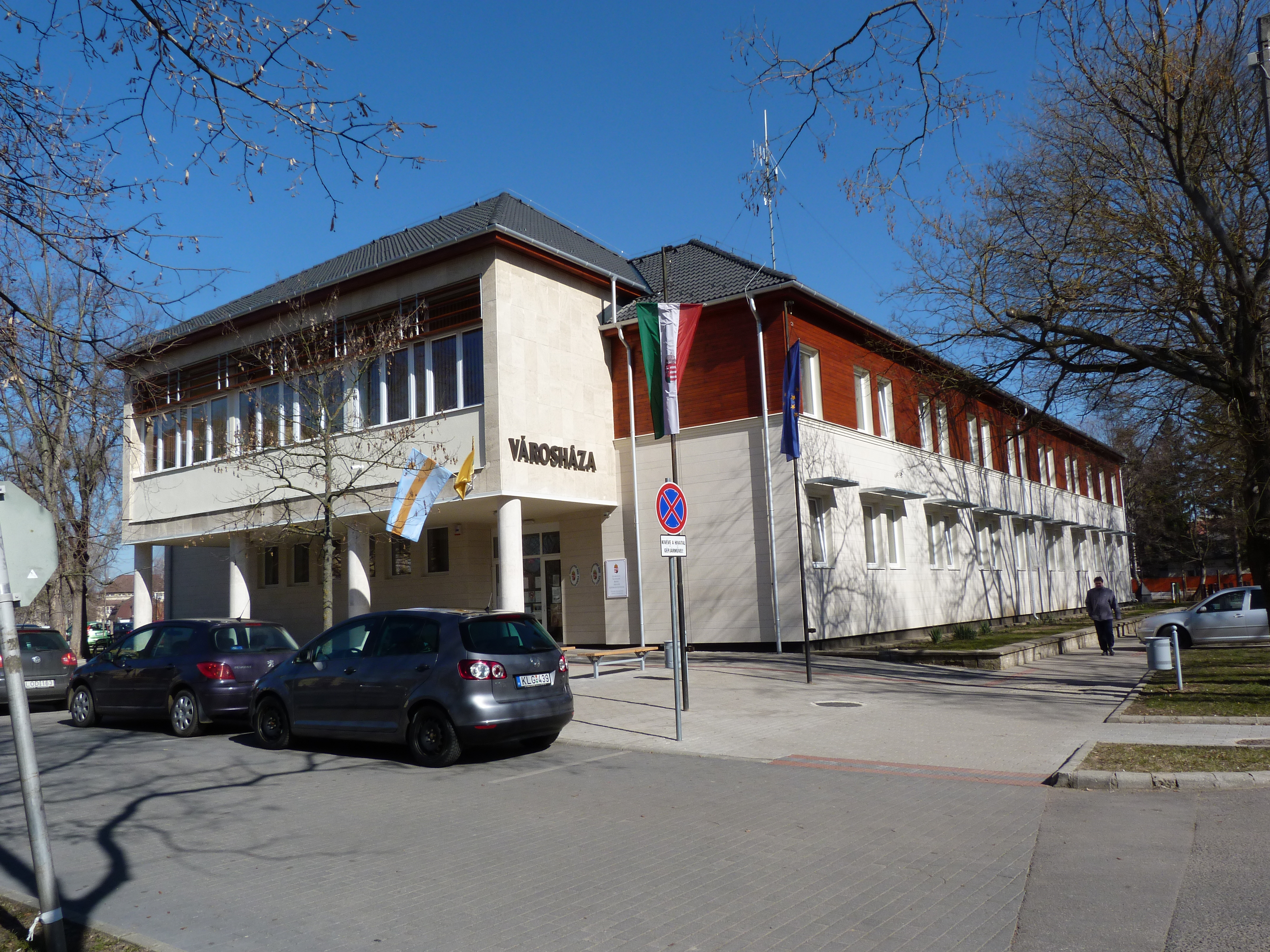
Vásárosnamény, Town Hall

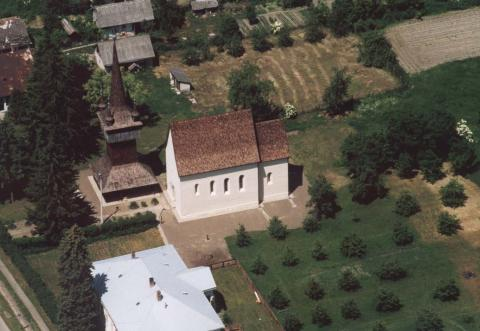
Aerial view of Lónya

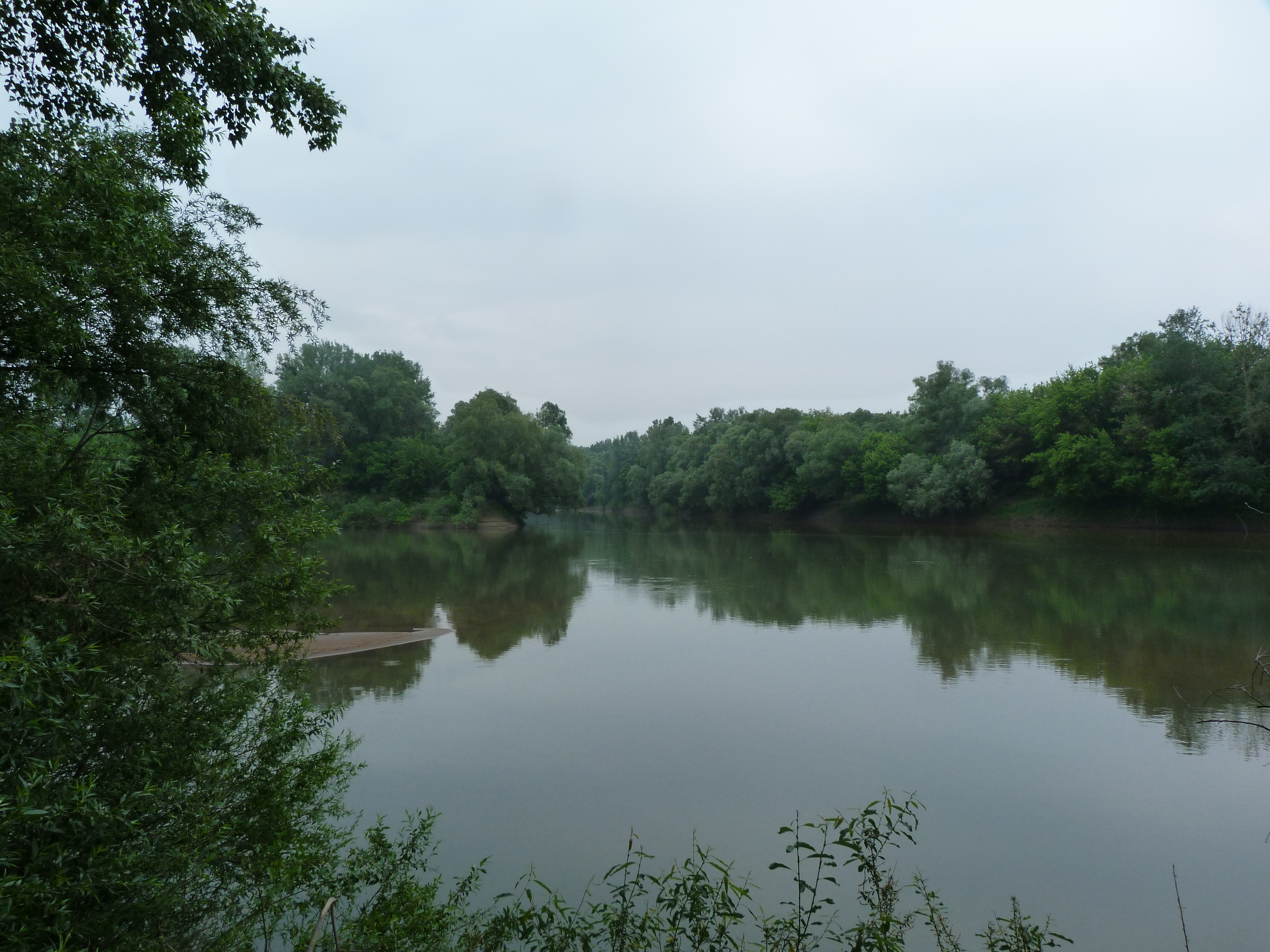
Conflux of the Tisza and Szamos river near Vásárosnemény

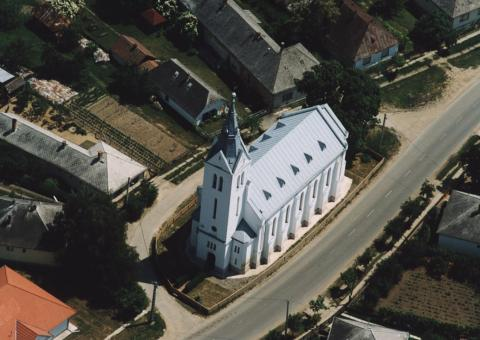
Reformed Church in Jánd

== See also ==
- List of cities and towns of Hungary
