= Hungarian Evangelical Fellowship =

Hungarian church of the Methodist confession

The Hungarian Evangelical Fellowship (HEF=Magyarországi Evangéliumi Testvérközösség – MET) is a Christian church of the Methodist confession. The Hungarian Evangelical Fellowship accepts spiritual affinity with the Methodists of the 18th century and with Methodist churches of today which have preserved that heritage. Its founders separated from the Hungarian Methodist Church (Magyarországi Metodista Egyház – MME) in 1974–1975, and suffered official harassment until it was officially registered on 1 October 1981. It is led by Gábor Iványi.

== Beliefs ==
The church accepts the Apostles' Creed, agrees with the common recognition of the German and Helvetian reformation, and professes articles of faith composed by John Wesley based on the 39 articles of the Anglican Church. The Fellowship professes Jesus Christ as its Savior. In conformity with the recognition of the Reformation, the only norm for its faith and Christian life is Holy Scripture. It seeks to fulfill its mission as a Christian church by trusting the guidance of the Holy Spirit. Its calling is to preach the Word of God in words and in writing, to provide spiritual care for its members, and to support all who wish to be converted and need and accept its service. It considers its duty to encourage the poor, needy, disabled and weak in society, and help the endangered to the best of its abilities.

== Foundation ==
In the 1970s members of HEF, due to internal tension created by the dictatorial powers of the communist Hungarian government and its state security forces, and because the church leaders of the MME were collaborating with the party-state elements, were forced to take their ministerial activities to a new community, and so exposed themselves to police and administrative harassment: dislodgement, church premises taken away, suspended imprisonment sentences, etc. This outcast group took strong action to protect their Methodist identity. In addition to using other symbols, their name request in Hungarian originally contained the word "Methodist". However, the State Office for Church Affairs (Állami Egyházügyi Hivatal) refused to let them use that name, since there was already a Methodist denomination in Hungary. So the initials of the name they chose, Magyarországi Evangéliumi Testvérközösség, form the first three letters of the word Methodist.

== Constitution ==
The main ecclesiastical board of the church is its National Assembly, headed by the President of the Church. The members of the National Assembly are fully ordained pastors and lay delegates of the congregations. Assistant ministers have a right of consultation at the National Assembly. Members of the church are gathered in congregations of various sizes. Smaller sub-congregations are often grouped into larger congregations, which in turn are grouped into church districts. The head of a congregation is its Pastor, employed by the church, or a person head it by the President of the Church. A small congregation can be formed where at least 10 members or candidates for membership ask for its establishment. When smaller congregations form one full congregation, the territory of the congregations is established by the President of the Church. The life of the congregation is directed by the pastor employed by the church or other person authorized by the President of the Church and the Parochial Assembly.

On the current status of the church and other Methodist-derived churches in Hungary see the Methodism article.

== Congregations ==
- Budapest – Center
- Budapest – Békásmegyer House of Reconciliation
- Budapest – Kispest
- Kisvárda
- Mátészalka
- Mórahalom
- Nyíregyháza
- Szeged

== Educational institutions ==
- Abaújkér John Wesley Elementary and Technical School, Training and Preparatory College and Dormitory
- Beregdaróc Elementary School
- Budapest John Wesley Kindergarten, Elementary and Training School
- Budapest Treasures of Wesley Elementary School
- Budapest John Wesley Theological College
- Budapest Educational Center for the Homeless
- Dunaújváros Wesley Da Capo Art School
- Gemzse Wesley Kindergarten and Elementary School
- Gulács Wesley Kindergarten and Elementary School
- Gyüre John Wesley Elementary School, Training and Preparatory College and Secondary School, Beginner's Art Institute and College
- Jánd Elementary School
- Márokpapi Elementary School
- Szeged John Wesley Elementary and Secondary School

== Homes for the Elderly ==
- Békéscsaba MET Oltalom Home for the Elderly
- Budaörs MET Home for the Elderly
- Esztergom Nursing Center for the Elderly
- Hetefejércse Oltalom Center for the Elderly

== Homeless Care Institutes ==
Temporary Hostel for Men, Temporary Hostel for Women, Night Shelter, Communal Kitchen, Heated Street, Temporary Home for Families, Hospital.

- Budapest 5th district
- Budapest 8th district
- Budapest 12th district

== Additional Institutes ==
- Christian Book House
- MET Holiday Home, Hejce
- Oltalom Charity Society
