= HEF =

Hef or HEF may refer to:

- Hef (rapper), Julliard Frans (born 1987), Dutch rapper
- Hefeweizen, a type of beer
- HEF Group, a French surface engineering company
- Herefordshire, county in England, Chapman code
- High-energy fuel, an experimental aircraft fuel
- High Expansion Foam, a type of Firefighting foam
- High explosive fragmentation, a type of ammunition or ordnance
- Historic Railway, Frankfurt (German: Historische Eisenbahn Frankfurt)
- Holocaust Educational Foundation, part of Northwestern University
- Hope Educational Foundation, in South Africa
- Hugh Hefner (1926–2017), American magazine publisher, founder and chief creative officer of Playboy Enterprises
- Hungarian Evangelical Fellowship
- Manassas Airport, in Virginia, United States
- Norwegian Humanist Association (Norwegian: Human-Etisk Forbund)
