= ILK (disambiguation) =

ILK or Ilk may refer to:

- Integrin-linked kinase, protein-coding gene in the species Homo sapiens
- ilk, the ISO 639-3 code for Bugkalot language
- Ilkley railway station, the station code ILK
- Ilk, a village in Szabolcs-Szatmár-Bereg county
- Herta Ilk (1902–1972), German FDP politician
