= András Benkei =

Hungarian politician (1923–1991)

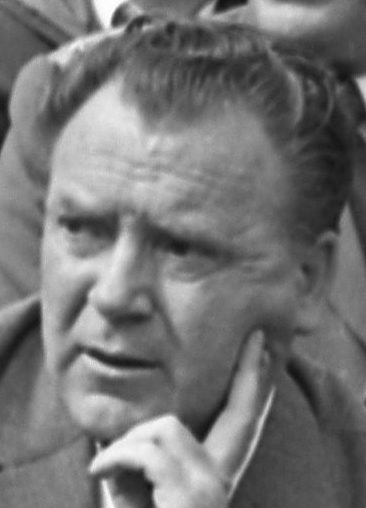

Minister of the Interior
- In office 7 December 1963 – 27 June 1980
- Preceded by: János Pap
- Succeeded by: István Horváth

Personal details
- Born: 11 September 1923 Nyíregyháza, Kingdom of Hungary
- Died: 8 August 1991 (aged 67) Budapest, Hungary
- Party: MDP (1950–1956); MSZMP (1956–1989)
- Profession: politician

András Benkei (September 11, 1923 – August 8, 1991) was a Hungarian communist politician, who served as Interior Minister between 1963 and 1980.

== Biography ==
Benkei was born in 1923 into a poor day labourer family. After finishing four elementary classes, he worked as a manual worker (engine fitter assistant, then tobacco fermenter) in Nyíregyháza. From August 1944, he served in the Royal Hungarian Army during the Second World War and was captured on the Eastern Front and deported to the Soviet Union as a prisoner of war in January 1945.

He returned to Hungary in July 1948, and soon he was involved in the tobacco fermenting trade union. He joined Hungarian Working People's Party (MDP), the ruling Communist party in 1950. He held several functions at party and trade union's organizations. He functioned as secretary of the Szabolcs-Szatmár-Bereg County committee of the Food Industry Workers' Union. From April 1954 to November 1956, he was the leader of the MDP in Nyíregyháza. Following the Hungarian Revolution of 1956, he served as First Secretary of the Hungarian Socialist Workers' Party's Szabolcs-Szatmár County branch between November 1956 and 7 December 1963.

After that he was appointed Minister of the Interior in the Second Cabinet of János Kádár. Despite the lack of professional qualifications, Benkei held the office for 16 and a half years, until 27 June 1980. Thus he is the longest-serving Interior Minister since the establishment of the ministry during the Hungarian Revolution of 1848. Benkei was one of the most faithful supporters of General Secretary and Prime Minister János Kádár. He studied for a year at the MSZMP's Party College. Beside his government position, Benkei was also a member of the Socialist Workers' Party's Central Committee from 25 December 1959 to 28 March 1985. Benkei was also a Member of Parliament three times (1958–1967, 1971–1975, 1980–1985), representing Szabolcs-Szatmár county list, Nyíregyháza (Constituency II) and the second district of Budapest (Budapest Constituency III), respectively. He became a pensioner in 1980.

== Personal life ==
According to historians Tabajdi–Ungváry's Az elhallgatott múlt work, for most of his life, Benkei became a drunkard. József Végvári, an intelligence officer within the secret services, who allowed the infiltration of the case Duna-gate, said that both Benkei's son in law (Tamás Augusztini and Zoltán Nyitrai), and his daughter worked as a counterespionage officer in the III./II. section of the Ministry for Interior prior to 1989.

Political offices
Preceded by János Pap	Minister of the Interior; 1963–1980	Succeeded by István Horváth
