= János Berecz =

Hungarian politician (1930–2022)

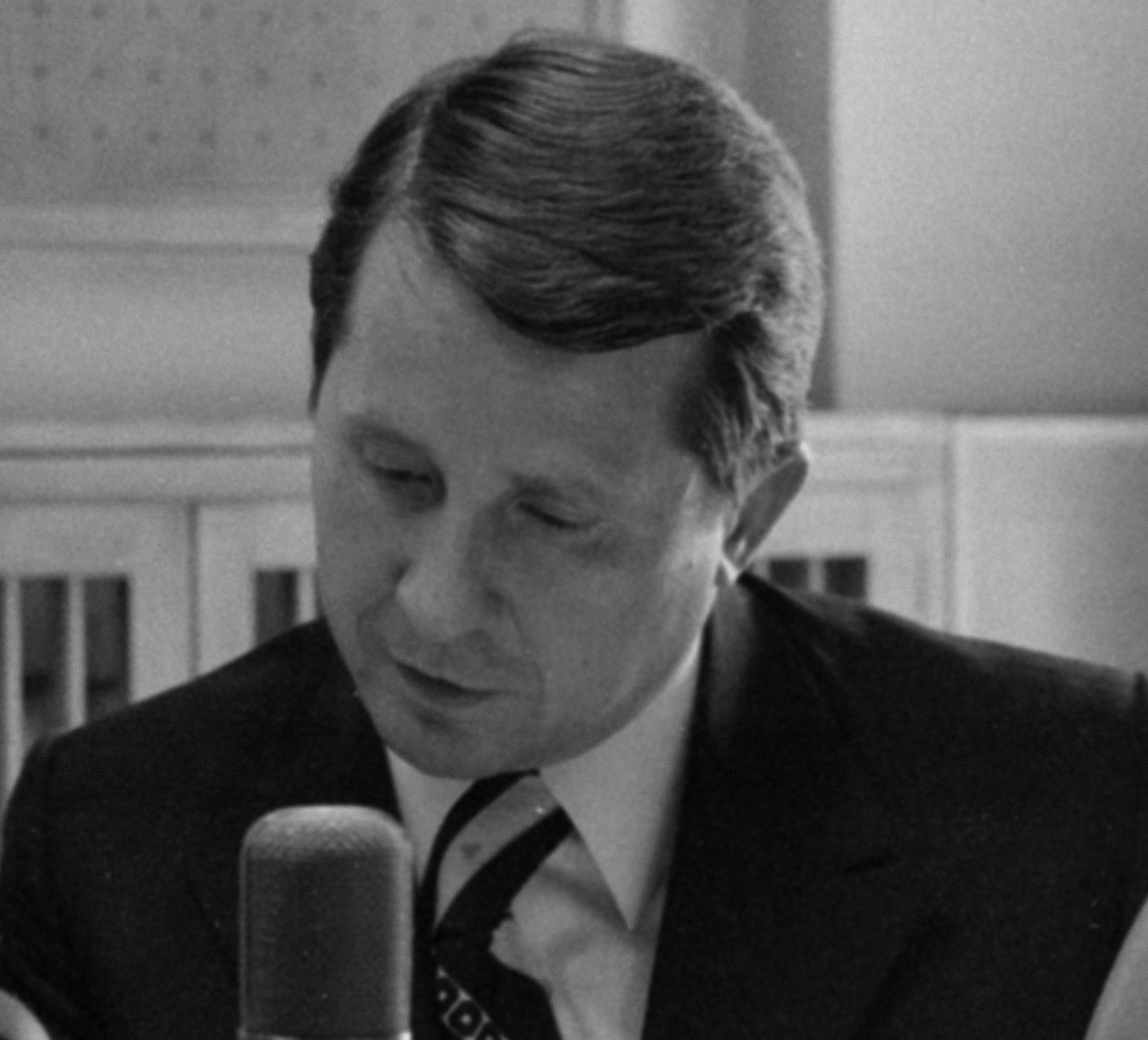
- Berecz in 1977

Member of the National Assembly
- In office 28 June 1985 – 1 May 1990

Personal details
- Born: 18 September 1930 Ibrány, Hungary
- Died: 7 July 2022 (aged 91) Budapest, Hungary
- Party: MDP (1951–1956); MSZMP (1956–1989); MSZMP (1989–1991); MSZDP (1997–1999)
- Other political affiliations: DISZ; KISZ
- Spouses: Annamária Lőwinger (m. 1955; died 1986) Anikó Sáfár (m. 1988–2022)
- Children: 3, including Marianne Berecz

János Berecz (18 September 1930 – 7 July 2022) was a Hungarian communist politician and ideologist, a leading member of the ruling Hungarian Socialist Workers' Party (MSZMP) in the 1980s. Along with Károly Grósz, he represented the party's hard-line Marxist-Leninist branch and was considered a potential candidate to succeed János Kádár as General Secretary of the Hungarian Socialist Workers' Party.

== Early life ==
János Berecz was born into farming peasant family in Ibrány in Szabolcs County on 18 September 1930, as the son of Elek Berecz and Emília K. Fekete. He attended elementary school in his birthplace (six-grade primary) and Dombrád (four-grade state civil school) until 1946. He attended the Reformed Gymnasium of Sárospatak from 1946, then Kossuth Lajos Gymnasium of Sátoraljaújhely from 1949. He graduated from there in 1950. He attended the Faculty of Arts of the University of Debrecen since 1950.

Berecz became a secretary of the Association of Working Youth (DISZ) within the university. He joined the Hungarian Working People's Party (MDP) in 1951. He studied scientific socialism in the Eötvös Loránd University since that year, then he was a student of the Lenin Institute, which emerged from ELTE, until 1955. He served as secretary of the youth communist organization DISZ within the institute and in charge of agitation and propaganda of its party committee.

== Early career ==
After earning a degree of scientific socialism, Berecz was delegated to the Budapest central committee of the DISZ as a political associate in 1955. In this capacity, he supervised the ideological operations of the University of Theatre Arts, the Academy of Music, the University of Fine Arts and the University of Applied Arts. Shortly after suppression of the Hungarian Revolution of 1956, Berecz joined the legal successor Hungarian Socialist Workers' Party (MSZMP) and later its youth branch Hungarian Young Communist League (KISZ). As a member of the Association of Hungarian University and College Students, he helped to drift the newly founded advocacy organization under the MSZMP in early 1957. Berecz was appointed president of the pro-communist Hungarian National Student Committee in the spring of 1958. He headed the university and Secondary School Department of the Central Committee of KISZ since September 1958. He established prosperous political relations with KISZ leader Zoltán Komócsin in this capacity.

Berecz studied in the Academy of Social Sciences of the Central Committee of the Communist Party of the Soviet Union in Moscow from 1963 to 1966. He defended his dissertation in 1967, earning candidate of historical sciences academic degree. His academic work titled Ellenforradalom tollal és fegyverrel ("A Counter-revolution with Pen and Gun"), which was published in 1969, was considered the scientific foundation of the "canonized" position of the Kádár regime on the events of 1956 until the dissolution of the Hungarian People's Republic in 1989.

== Party career ==
Returning to Hungary, Berecz entered foreign service. He functioned as Secretary of the Party Committee of the Ministry of Foreign Affairs since August 1966. In this capacity, he participated in preparation for opening diplomatic relations with West Germany and preliminary negotiations of the Warsaw Pact invasion of Czechoslovakia in August 1968. He was appointed deputy head (since 1972), then head (from 1974 to 1982) of the Foreign Affairs Department of the Central Committee of MSZMP. He was elected to the central committee in March 1980. He worked as editor-in-chief of Népszabadság from 1982 to 1985.

Berecz rose to prominence in the spring of 1985, when hard-line branch of the ruling party obtained important positions. He was delegated to the Secretariat of the Central Committee in March 1985, in charge of agitation and propaganda. Succeeding György Aczél, he was responsible for the task of censoring opposition writers. Berecz was also elected a Member of Parliament for Gávavencsellő (Szabolcs-Szatmár 6th constituency) in the 1985 Hungarian parliamentary election.Upon the request of János Kádár, Berecz was elected to the Political Committee of the MSZMP in June 1987. In the subsequent years, he became a close associate of prime minister then general secretary Károly Grósz. Due to his staunch Marxist–Leninist politician positions, he was gradually marginalized within the party, when a peaceful transition to democracy began. He was not re-elected to the Political Committee in April 1989, then was replaced as secretary for ideology and propaganda in June 1989. He chaired the parliament's foreign affairs committee from June 1989 to May 1990.

== Later life ==
When the last congress of MSZMP decided to abolish and reorganize itself into the Hungarian Socialist Party (MSZP) in December 1989, Berecz was among those hard-line communists who did not join the new social democratic party and established its "intellectual successor", also called the Hungarian Socialist Workers' Party (the present-day Hungarian Workers' Party). Berecz was announced to become leader of the 20-member caucus in the parliament, serving in this capacity from December 1989 to May 1990. Berecz ran as a candidate in the 1990 Hungarian parliamentary election, but did not secure a mandate and the MSZMP under the leadership of Gyula Thürmer did not reach the parliamentary threshold too. He left the party in 1991 and was a vocal supporter of the Left Wing Unity Movement. He was briefly a member of the Social Democratic Party of Hungary (MSZDP) between 1997 and 1999.

Berecz then retired and wrote several books. His autobiographical work Vállalom ("I maintain") was published in 2004. In 2003, he was elected honorary citizen in his native village of Ibrány.

== Personal life ==
His first wife was Annamária Lőwinger (1933–1986), deputy director of the National General Directorate of Spas. They married in 1955. They had three children, including diplomat Marianne Berecz. Annamária Lőwinger died in a car accident on 4 February 1986. Thereafter, Berecz married actress Anikó Sáfár in 1988.

János Berecz died in Budapest on 7 July 2022, at the age of 91.

== Bibliography ==
- Elek, István: Rendszerváltoztatók húsz év után, Magyar Rádió Zrt. és Heti Válasz Lap- és Könyvkiadó Kft., 2009. (interview, pp. 256–263.)
