= Sándor Haraszti =

Hungarian journalist and politician

Sándor Haraszti (18 November 1897 – 19 January 1982) was a Hungarian journalist and politician.

== Biography ==
Harszati was born in the family of a coachman. After graduating from school, he became a railway worker at the MÁV. During the Hungarian Soviet Republic, Haraszti fought in the Ranks of the Hungarian Red Army.

In 1919, he joined the Hungarian Social Democratic Party (MSZDP) in Pécs and went into exile in 1921 in the Kingdom of Yugoslavia. He then worked in Bač as an editor for the Hungarian-language newspaper Bács-megyei Naplóas. After returning to Hungary in 1929, he joined the illegal Hungarian Communist Party (KMP) as a member and was particularly involved in cultural work. In 1930, he became editor of the Kolozsvár newspaper Korunk and was repeatedly arrested for his illegal communist activities. In June 1944, as a member of the Peace Party (successor of the KMP). After the occupation of Hungary by the German Wehrmacht, he took part in armed struggles of the underground movement.

After the end of the Second World War, Haraszti was between 1945 and 1948 the editor of the Budapest daily newspaper Szabadság and then in 1948 deputy head of the Agitation and Propaganda Department of the Central Committee of the Hungarian Working People's Party (MDP), which was founded after upon the merger of the KMP and MSZDP.

In 1949, during the Rákosi era, he became director of the Athanaeum Publishing House, before he was arrested in 1950 for alleged anti-party activities and initially sentenced to death. The sentence was later commuted to life imprisonment. In the course of the cautious liberalization and de-Stalinization during the first government of Prime Minister Imre Nagy, he was rehabilitated and released from prison in 1954 together with numerous other victims of the show and secret trials. He then became editor of the newspaper Béke és Szabadság, but was dismissed in October 1955 for another deviation from the party line of Mátyás Rákosi. Together with other writers and journalists, he signed a memorandum for the release of political dissident Miklós Vásárhelyi. In July 1956 he was also expelled from the MDP and the journalists' association (MÚOSZ).

In October 1956, during the Hungarian uprising, Haraszti became editor-in-chief of the newly founded Népszabadság, Hungary's largest-circulation national daily. In the course of the suppression of the uprising with the support of the Soviet Army, he fled together with Imre Nagy on November 4, 1956, to the Yugoslav embassy, which was then surrounded by Soviet tanks for three weeks. He left the embassy with Nagy on November 22, 1956, but was arrested and deported to Snagov in Romania for solitary confinement. His successor as editor-in-chief of Népszabadság then became Dezső Nemes in January 1957.

In 1958 Haraszti was brought back to Budapest and sentenced to six years in prison before the sentence was released under an amnesty decreed by Hungarian Socialist Workers' Party Secretary General János Kádár in 1960. From 1960 to 1980 he worked as an editor at the Academy Publishing House (Akadémiai Kiadó), which published encyclopedias.
