= Béla Biszku =

Hungarian politician (1921–2016)

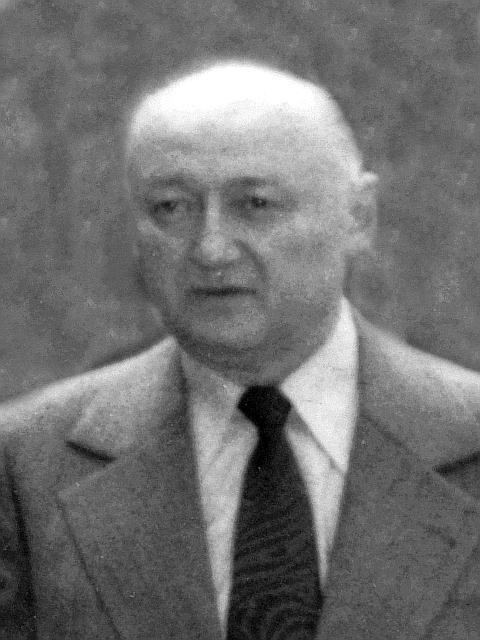
- Béla Biszku in 1985

Minister of the Interior
- In office 1 March 1957 – 13 September 1961
- Preceded by: Ferenc Münnich (in 1956)
- Succeeded by: János Pap

Personal details
- Born: 13 September 1921 Márokpapi, Hungary
- Died: 31 March 2016 (aged 94) Budapest, Hungary
- Party: MKP (1944–1948); MDP (1948–1956); MSZMP (1956–1989)
- Parent(s): György Biszku; Etelka Debreczeni
- Education: University of Zagreb
- Profession: politician

Béla Biszku (13 September 1921 – 31 March 2016) was a Hungarian communist politician, who served as Minister of the Interior from 1957 to 1961. He was charged of suspicion of committing war crimes during the suppression of the Hungarian Revolution of 1956, becoming the first and to date only former top-official in Hungary who has been prosecuted because of political role in the communist era.

== Early life ==
Béla Biszku was born in Márok, Bereg County (today Márokpapi, Szabolcs-Szatmár-Bereg County) on 13 September 1921 as the son of György Biszku and Etelka Debreczeni, who were farm workers. After finishing six years of elementary studies and four years of state civil school, he came afterwards to the locksmith's apprenticeship for the Wertheim Elevator & Machine Manufacture in 1937. Already in 1938 Biszku was active in the youth organisation of the metalworkers in the workers' area of Angyalföld in Budapest. From 1941 to 1942, he worked at Marx & Mérei Scientific Instruments Plant, and from 1942 to 1945, he was employed by Hungarian Philips Works. In 1943, Biszku joined Vasas Szakszervezet, the metalworker's trade union and participated energetically in organizing work.

Biszku joined the Hungarian Communist Party (MKP) in 1944 and participated in the Angyalföld resistance movement that fought against the Nazi German occupation force and against the collaborationist pro-fascist Arrow Cross Party government during the end of World War II. After the war, he played a role in the organization of the Budapest Police, then he established the Angyalföld branch of the communist party. He had worked for the MKP's Budapest Party Committee since 1946.

== Political career ==
For six weeks, he functioned as deputy head of the Cadre Department of the Central Leadership of the Hungarian Working People's Party (MDP) in May 1949. By the 1949 parliamentary election, the MDP had established a single party state and Soviet-type totalitarian dictatorship. Biszku worked for the Cadre Department of the Budapest Party Committee until 1951, when he was replaced. Following that, he became the secretary of the Party Committee of the Kőbánya branch. He had attended the party's Political College (PF) since September 1953. He was appointed First Secretary of the Angyalföld branch's Party Committee in the Spring of 1955.

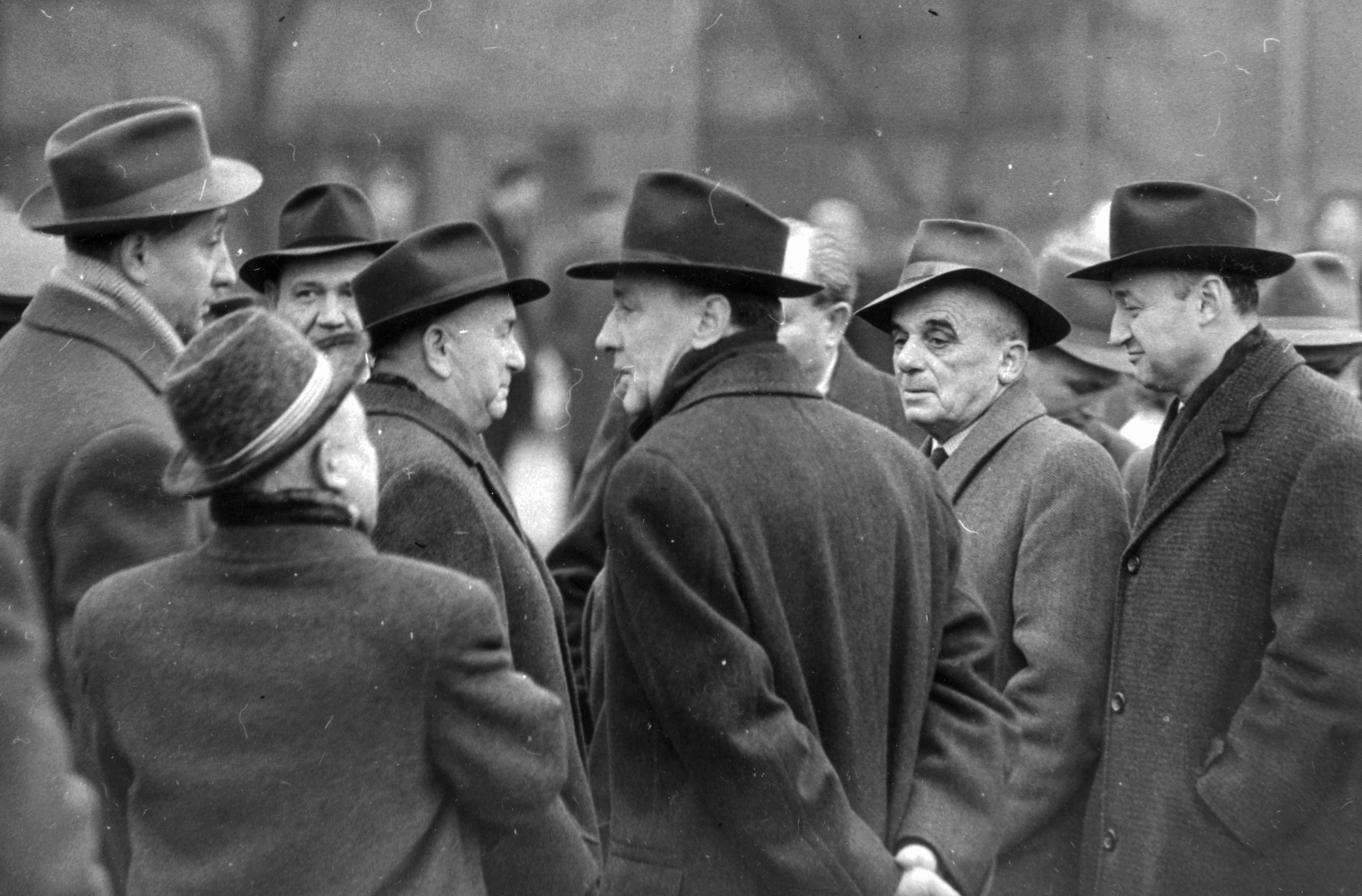
Communist politicians in 1960, including Biszku (right) and Kádár (middle)

During the 1956 Hungarian Revolution, he recruited local pro-communist armed groups among party members and workers against the rebels in the first days of the popular uprising. As a result, he was awarded with Medal for Worker-Peasant Power in April 1958, after the suppression of the revolution. Following long years of work in party organizations, Biszku sprang into prominence after the events of 1956.

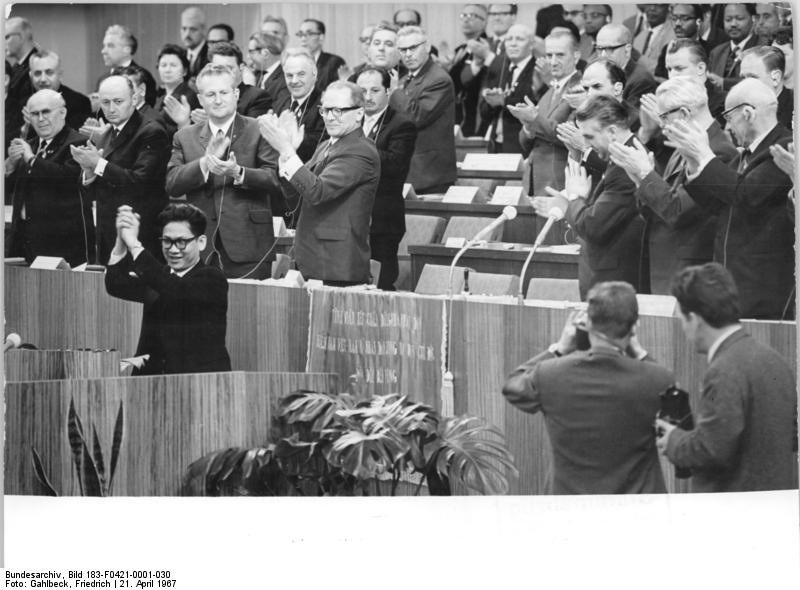
Biszku at the 7th Congress of the Socialist Unity Party of Germany in 1967

Between 1957 and 1961 he served as Minister of the Interior in the government of János Kádár. In this capacity, he became known for the severity he showed in suppressing and punishing after the 1956 revolution, which was one of the largest revolt against the communist government in the Eastern Bloc and its Soviet-imposed policies, was defeated. Between 1961–1962 Biszku became the deputy prime minister, alongside Antal Apró, Jenő Fock and Gyula Kállai. He was replaced by Lajos Fehér on 27 November 1962. Biszku was also elected Member of Parliament during the 1958 parliamentary election, representing Constituency I in Szabolcs-Szatmár County. He was MP until April 1971, when did not stand for re-election in the 1971 parliamentary election. From 1962 until 1978, he was the Secretary of the Central Committee of the Hungarian Socialist Workers' Party (MSZMP).

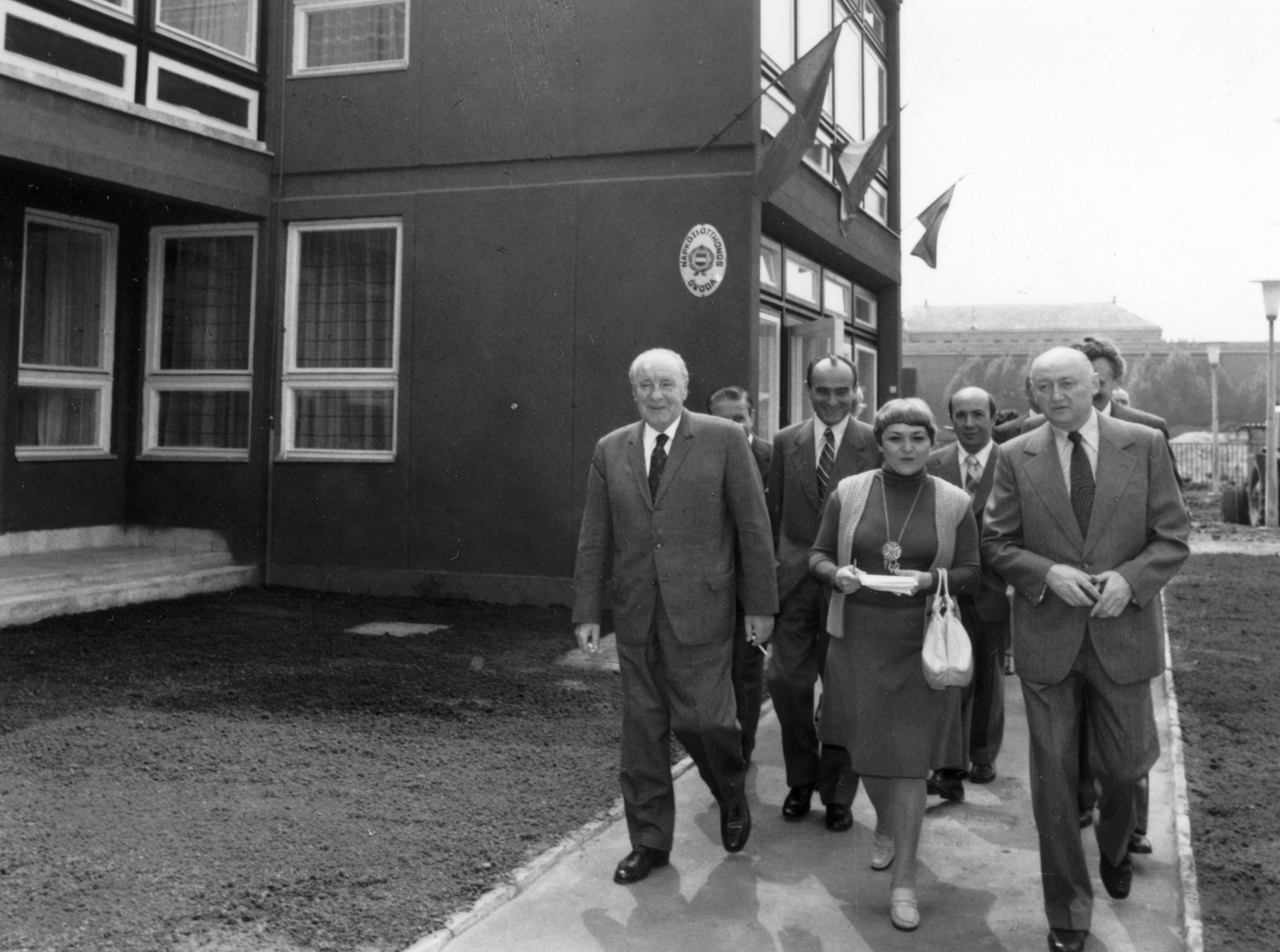
Kádár and Biszku in 1985

Biszku, as a hard-line communist, strongly opposed the New Economic Mechanism (ÚGM) which was imposed by the Kádár regime in 1968 and contained "capitalist elements". In 1972, together with Zoltán Komócsin, and other fellow communists, he became involved in a plot to force János Kádár to resign from virtually all of his public functions in an effort to return Hungary to a more orthodox Soviet-style line. To achieve his goals, Biszku tried to convince Yuri Andropov of the rightness of his cause, who immediately alerted Kádár. Afterwards Kádár slowly removed Biszku from power. Biszku was again MP between 1975 and 1985, representing Constituency II in Szabolcs-Szatmár County.

He was forced into retirement in 1978, when Károly Németh replaced him as Secretary of the Central Committee. From 1980 to 1989, he served as Chairman of the Audit Committee of the National Council of Trade Unions (SZOT). The MSZMP's leadership adopted a new electoral system for the 1985 parliamentary election which imposed a multiple candidacy system in each constituency. Biszku was defeated by another MSZMP member and lost his parliamentary seat.

== Retirement ==
From 1989, the end of communism and transition to democracy until 2011, he successfully evaded any kind of prosecution for human rights abuses committed under the Kádár regime while living in relative obscurity, and sought to portray the regime in a favorable light.

In the summer of 2008, Hungarian blogger and documentary filmmaker Fruzsina Skrabski published a post with the title "Kommunisták, reszkessetek!", where she announced a search for still living former Communist politicians. Skrabski and Tamás Novák presented themselves as members of a non-existent local organization to Biszku, claiming that they intended to make a movie about him, "Márokpapi's famous son". They disclosed their true intention only during their last meeting, after organizing a fake celebration with background performers in the village. At first, Biszku did not reject his contribution and answered sensitive political questions also. There, Biszku called the 1956 revolution a "counter-revolution" and added he had not felt any regret or remorse for the death penalties and retaliatory measures. He also said that Imre Nagy, prime minister of the revolution, had "deserved his fate".

Biszku first consented to the premiere but after major media coverage, withdrew his permission. His family also protested against screening in a cinema in Budapest. The documentary movie entitled "Crime Without Punishment" was screened in June 2010. Later, Biszku's daughters, after seeing the movie contributed to the projection. The parliamentary Committee on Culture and Media also supported the screening and the national assembly later adopted a law that historical documentaries in general should not be banned from public showing on grounds of rights to privacy.

== Criminal investigation and trial ==
The National Assembly adopted a so-called "lex Biszku" bill, which aims to prosecute former leading communist politicians and law enforcement officials who are seen as responsible for the deterring of the 1956 uprising. Gergely Gulyás told a press conference in October 2011 that the bill is constitutional and consistent with international law.

A criminal investigation against Biszku was opened in 2011. He is being charged with "denial of communist crimes" that may result in a three-year jail sentence.

On 10 September 2012, Biszku was placed under house arrest on charge of suspicion of committing war crimes. He is the first politician of the 1956 Communist leadership to face a criminal inquiry. He is accused of failing to protect civilians in wartime. In addition, he needs to hold responsibility for ordering the security forces to open fire on crowds. In case, he is found guilty of the charges brought up against him, which he himself has denied, he could face a life imprisonment.

His trial was scheduled to begin on 18 March 2014. On 13 May 2014 he was found guilty of war crimes during the suppression of the 1956 uprising. He was convicted of ordering security forces to open fire on civilians, killing 49 people, and was sentenced to five years and six months in prison. Biszku was also found guilty of other charges, including "denial of communist crimes". However, the Metropolitan Court of Appeals set aside the first degree sentence and ordered a new trial on 1 June 2015. The Court of Appeals argued that there were "essential and substantive differences between establishing historical responsibility and criminal responsibility."

During the repeat procedure, the Metropolitan Court of Budapest sentenced Biszku to two years in prison, suspended for three years for complicity in war crimes on 17 December 2015. The court also ruled, however, that there was insufficient evidence that Biszku as Minister of the Interior and member of the MSZMP's so-called Provisional Executive Committee had issued the order to fire on 49 protesters in Salgótarján in December 1956 or beat up academics in March 1957.

Biszku died in Budapest on 31 March 2016 at the age of 94, before the potential sentence of the repeat procedure's second degree. Fruzsina Skrabski, who made that documentary film which brought Biszku's impunity and high pension salary to the surface, said the Hungarian jurisdiction "are awaiting his death [...] to prevent the start of an avalanche [...] with regard to the impeachment of former high-ranking Communist politicians."

== Literature ==
- Szabó, Miklós: Adalékok a Magyar Néphadsereg 1961-1962. évi történetéhez. 1. rész, in: Új Honvédségi Szemle. LXI. évf., 2007/9. sz., 96. p
- Bölöny, József: Magyarország kormányai. 1848–1992, 4. bőv. és jav. kiad., Akadémiai Kiadó, Budapest, 1992. 269. p.
- G. Tabajdi, K. Ungvári: Elhallgatott múlt, Corvina, Budapest, 2008, pp. 99–100.

Political offices
Preceded by Ferenc Münnich	Minister of the Interior; 1957–1961	Succeeded by János Pap
