= Gábor Iványi =

Hungarian pastor (born 1951)

- Iványi Gábor
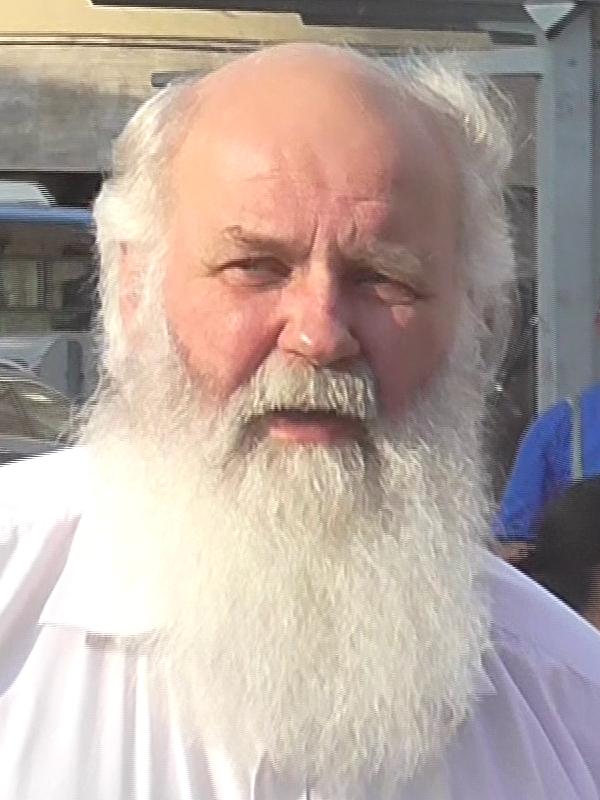
- Born: 3 October 1951 (age 74); Szolnok, Hungarian People's Republic
- Citizenship: Hungary
- Education: Wesley János Lelkészképző Főiskola
- Occupation: Pastor
- Organization: Hungarian Evangelical Fellowship
- Partner: Magdolna Sinka
- Children: 6

Gábor Iványi (born 3 October 1951) is a Hungarian pastor. The leader of the Hungarian Evangelical Fellowship, a Methodist congregation, he has become known for his advocacy of the poor in Hungary, as well as his criticisms of the country's Prime Minister, Viktor Orbán.

== Biography ==
Iványi was born in 1951 in Szolnok in what was then the Hungarian People's Republic. His cousin, Imre Papp, was a member of the rock band Gemini.

After training as a Methodist pastor, during the 1970s he became the leader of the Hungarian Evangelical Fellowship (Hungarian: Magyarországi Evangéliumi Testvérközösség, MET). Under his leadership, the MET became known for its social activism and outreach work, including the establishment of schools, care homes and homeless shelters across Hungary. The MET had a membership of around 20,000 as of 2024.

=== Activism and subsequent government confrontations ===
Iványi has been described as a former supporter and ally of Viktor Orbán, a prominent member of the national-conservative Fidesz political party; Iványi baptised two of Orbán's children, and presided over his vow renewal with his wife, Anikó. Iványi's activism, particularly in support of minority groups, including refugees and LGBTQ people, became increasingly at odds with Orbán's self-described "illiberal Christian democratic" ideology, which has led to Iványi being described as "one of Orbán's fiercest critics". In 2019, in response to an Orbán speech in which he stated he was "defending Christian freedom", Iványi was among a group of Christian dissidents who signed the Advent Declaration, which, among other issues, explicitly stated its support for refugees and LGBTQ people.

In 2011, the Orbán government stripped the MET's status as an officially recognised church in Hungary; in total, the number of officially recognised religious groups in Hungary was reduced from 358 to 14. As a result, the MET lost the funding that it previously received from the government. Iványi launched an application to the European Court of Human Rights, which in 2013 ruled Orbán's actions as illegal, ordering that the MET be reinstated as an official religious group and that it receive the funding that it should have received between 2011 and the ruling. As of 2025, the government had not reinstated the funding.

In February 2022, the Hungarian tax authority raided the offices of Oltalom Karitatív Egyesület, the MET's sister charitable organisation, due to allegations of social security fraud; Oltalom ran the MET's outreach services. During the raid, Iványi arranged for the media and local politicians, including Zita Gurmai, Anna Donáth, Bernadett Szél and Károly Herényi to be present as he attempted to enter the building and prevent the raid; this was ultimately unsuccessful. As a result of subsequent financial pressures, the MET was forced to close its homeless shelters; in 2024, Hungarian authorities removed the operating licences for three schools for children from low-income households, leading to them being shut down by Oltalom.

On 3 November 2025, Iványi, alongside Gurmai, Donáth, Szél and Herényi, were charged with "group-committed violence against an official person" in relation to the 2022 raid of the MET's offices, where it was alleged that they had pushed officers preventing their entry to the building. Iványi disputed this, stating that the officers had pushed him and his group, and suggested the timing of the charges were linked to the forthcoming 2026 Hungarian parliamentary election. The prosecutor subsequently recommended that Iványi receive a two-year suspended prison sentence.

== Recognition ==
Human Rights Watch has criticised the Hungarian government's harassment of Iványi and the MET, including its obstruction of the MET's humanitarian work and activities. It called on the government to end its harassment.

The New York Times described Iványi as having "near mythical status" in Hungary. Iványi was featured in the BBC World Service documentary The Pastor and the Prime Minister, aired in 2020, focusing on his relationship with Orbán.

In 2022, it was suggested that Iványi was being considered as a potential candidate for United for Hungary in the presidential election; however, his nomination was vetoed by Jobbik, and ultimately Péter Róna was selected. In 2026, following the election of Péter Magyar and his dismissal of Tamás Sulyok, Iványi was named by multiple outlets as a possible candidate for the presidency.
