= János Kamara =

Hungarian politician (1927–2000)

Minister of the Interior of Hungary
- In office 29 March 1985 – 16 December 1987
- Preceded by: István Horváth
- Succeeded by: István Horváth

Personal details
- Born: 1 May 1927; Budapest, Hungary
- Died: 3 July 2000 (aged 73)
- Political party: MSZMP
- Profession: politician

Lt. Gen. János Kamara (1 May 1927 – 3 July 2000) was a Hungarian communist politician, who served as Interior Minister between 1985 and 1987.

Political offices
Preceded by István Horváth	Minister of the Interior; 1985–1987	Succeeded by István Horváth
