= Népszabadság =

Hungarian daily newspaper (1956–2016)

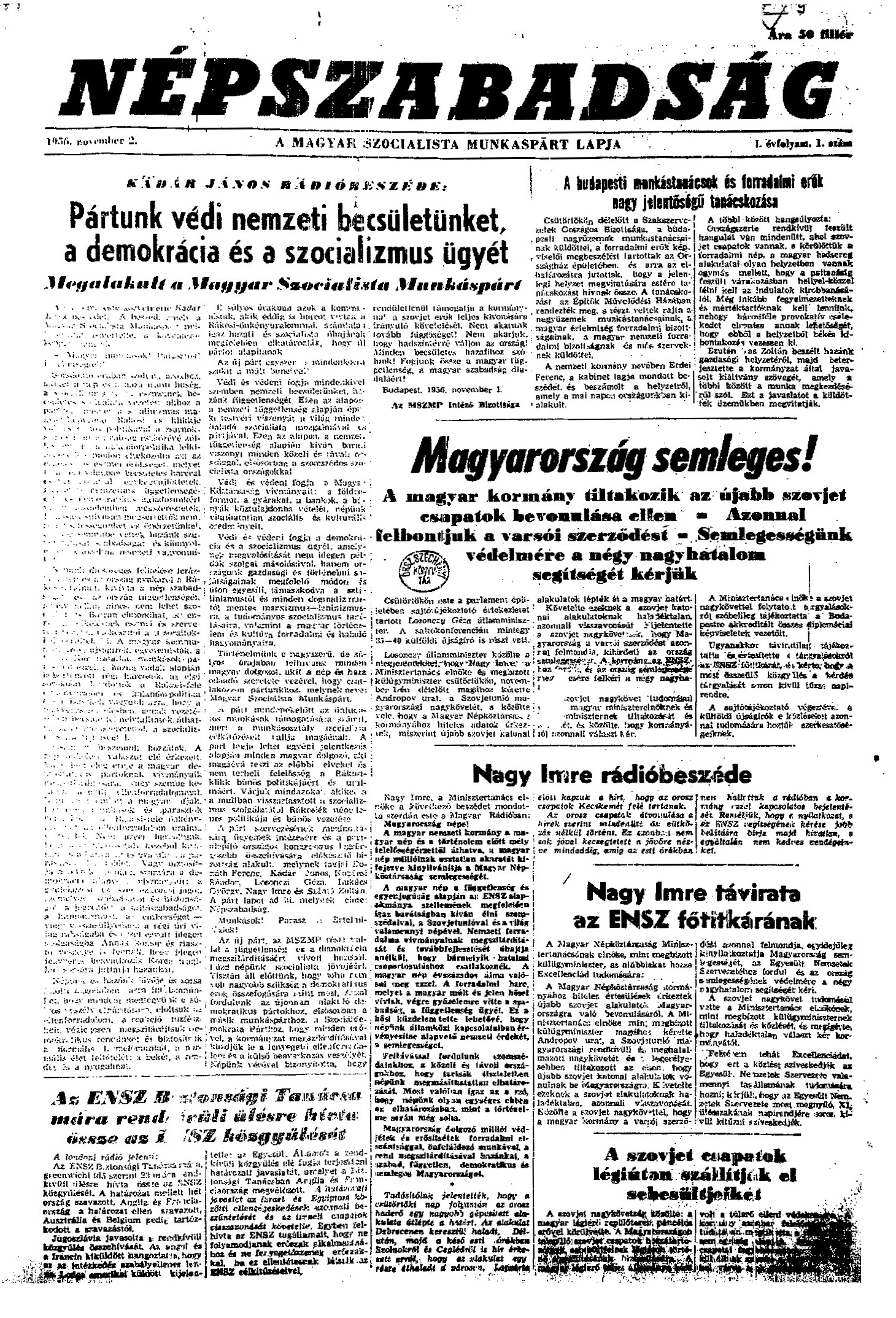
- Front page of the first issue
- Type: News magazine (since 2026); Daily newspaper (1956–2016)
- Format: Broadsheet (before 2016)
- Publisher: Liberty Press Kft.
- Editor-in-chief: Ákos Tóth
- Deputy editor: Gábor Horváth; Zoltán Lakner; Brigitta Szabó; Dóra Varga
- Founded: 2 November 1956
- Ceased publication: 8 October 2016
- Relaunched: 8 October 2026
- Political alignment: Left-wing
- Language: Hungarian
- Headquarters: 1054 Budapest, Honvéd utca 8.
- Country: Hungary
- Circulation: 37,164 (as of Q2 2016)
- ISSN: 0133-1752 (print); 1416-4906 (web)
- OCLC number: 35363283
- Website: nszo.hu

Népszabadság (Hungarian: [ˈneːpsɒbɒt͡ʃːaːɡ]; lit. 'Liberty of the People') is a Hungarian weekly news magazine which was formerly the official press organ as a daily newspaper of the Hungarian Socialist Workers' Party during the Hungarian People's Republic. Before its closure, Népszabadság was considered the de facto newspaper of record for Hungary. After its abrupt and controversial closure in 2016 under the third Orbán government, the paper relaunched exactly a decade later, in 2026.

== History and profile ==
=== Pre-closure ===
Former logo used during the communist era

Népszabadság was founded on 2 November 1956 during the Hungarian Revolution as successor of Szabad Nép (Hungarian: Free People) which was established in 1942 as the central organ of the dissolved Hungarian Working People's Party. Népszabadság was also the organ of the party.

At the beginning of the 1990s, following the collapse of the communist regime, the paper was privatized and the owners became Bertelsmann AG Germany (50%), the Free Press Foundation (Szabad Sajtó Alapítvány in Hungarian), a foundation of the Socialist Party (MSZP) (26%), the First Hungarian Investment Fund (16.8%), and the Editorial Staff Association (6%). In 2005, the paper was acquired by Ringier; in 2014, after the Hungarian Competition Authority prevented the merger of Ringier and Axel Springer partly because of their ownership of Népszabadság, it was sold to Vienna Capital Partners, which created a subsidy, Mediaworks Hungary Zrt., for its Hungarian media interests. MSZP sold its shares to Mediaworks in 2015.

The paper was published in broadsheet format and had its main office in Budapest. In 2004, the newspaper secured sufficient funds to build an entirely new, high-capacity, full-color printing facility for its own exclusive use, which was unusual for the Hungarian press. The expanded use of color was meant as a means to help Népszabadság's competitive position among daily newspapers. It had more copies circulated than all of its Hungarian competitors combined, although circulation was already in the process of decline (see below).

The paper was close to the MSZP and Alliance of Free Democrats (SZDSZ) parties and its editorials often supported, though frequently also criticized, the socialist-liberal government. Its international agenda was usually supportive of the EU's and the USA's policies, though rare criticism included U.S. President George W. Bush's "democracy export" initiative. Népszabadság followed the US in calling certain countries rogue states or part of the axis of evil and was somewhat critical of Arab countries, both on political and human rights grounds.

Marcell Murányi was appointed as editor-in-chief in July 2014. He resigned in May 2015 after being charged with a fatal hit and run, and was replaced in August by his brother András Murányi. Murányi Marcell was eventually sentenced to a jail term suspended for two years; he continued to serve as an advisor for the Népszabadság.

=== Closure ===
The paper was suddenly closed by its owner Mediaworks on 8 October 2016. The journalists were preparing for a move to a new headquarters; on Friday they vacated their old office and were still planning a Sunday opening party in the new office; on Saturday they were told they were all suspended and not allowed to enter the building. Publication ceased and its website was disconnected. The departure of former Mediaworks CEO Balázs Rónai was announced on the same day. Mediaworks announced that the closure was a business decision due to the paper suffering losses. The liquidation of the paper was performed by acting CEO Viktor Katona, who himself resigned (claiming health reasons) on the following Monday, making it impossible for the journalists to negotiate with anyone in charge.

The closure was considered by the political left to be the work of governing party Fidesz acting behind the scenes. Alleged meetings between prime minister Viktor Orbán and Mediaworks owner Heinrich Pecina over the transfer of Népszabadság were reported as early as June. Contrary to the owner's assertion of unprofitability, portal 'The Budapest Beacon' commented that after the previous losses, the paper turned a profit of HUF 130 million (US$480,000) in 2015, but does not provide any source or proof for this information. Heinrich Pecina, the owner of the Mediaworks Hungary Zrt said that the decision was based merely on a financial basis: in the last few years the Népszabadság had a 5 billion Forints loss in total. He also added that he had offered to sell the Népszabadság to the Hungarian Socialist Party, but they later "had no courage to buy it".

=== Relaunch ===
On 8 October 2026, a decade after its closure, Népszabadság relaunched as a weekly news magazine and news site. The reopening was funded by four Hungarian businessmen.

== Circulation ==
Népszabadság had the largest circulation in Hungary until 2002 when it was overtaken by Blikk, a tabloid newspaper and Metropol, a free newspaper. The circulation of Népszabadság then declined and the number of readers fell significantly in the period between 2005 and 2010. Even so, it had the highest circulation amongst political dailies (the next largest, Magyar Nemzet, had a circulation of 17,390 in the second quarter of 2016).

The following circulation numbers are based on audited data:

- 1989: 460,000
- 1991: 327,000
- 1993: 305,000
- 1994: 300,000
- 1995: 285,000
- 1998: 225,000
- 2000: 203,000
- 2002: 195,000
- 2003: 172,000
- 2009: 100,000
- 2010: 70,000
- 2011: 63,000
- 2013: 46,000
- 2016: 37,000

== Scandals ==
In 2003, Népszabadság was subject to a high-profile scandal after the paper published a letter on the front page purportedly from Edward Teller. The letter, later proved to be a fake, appeared in Népszabadság shortly after the death of the Hungarian-born physicist and known Fidesz-sympathiser Teller, claiming to express dissatisfaction with antisemitism and anti-US sentiments in the party. The letter turned out to be written by the retired journalist László Zeley, Teller's Hungarian editor, who tried but failed to convince Teller to sign it. Népszabadság published the letter without verifying its authenticity, and had to retract it the following day, prompting an ethical reprimand from MÚOSZ (Association of Hungarian Journalists). The editor-in-chief resigned following the affair, and got elected to the head of the Ethical Committee of the MÚOSZ between 2004 and 2011.

== Editors-in-chief ==
- 31 October 1956 – 8 April 1957: Sándor Haraszti
- 1957–1961: Dezső Nemes (head of the editorial board)
- September 1961 – June 1965: Zoltán Komócsin
- 1965–1970: János Gosztonyi
- 1970–1974: István Sarlós
- 1974–1977: István Katona
- 1977–1980: Dezső Nemes
- 1980–1982: Péter Várkonyi
- 1982–1985: János Berecz
- 1985–1989: Gábor Borbély
- 1989–2004: Pál Eötvös
- 2004–2011: Károly T. Vörös
- 2011–2014: Levente Tóth
- 2014–2015: Marcell Murányi
- 2015: Péter N. Nagy
- 2015–2016: András Murányi
- 2026–present: Ákos Tóth
