= Fruzsina Skrabski =

Hungarian filmmaker

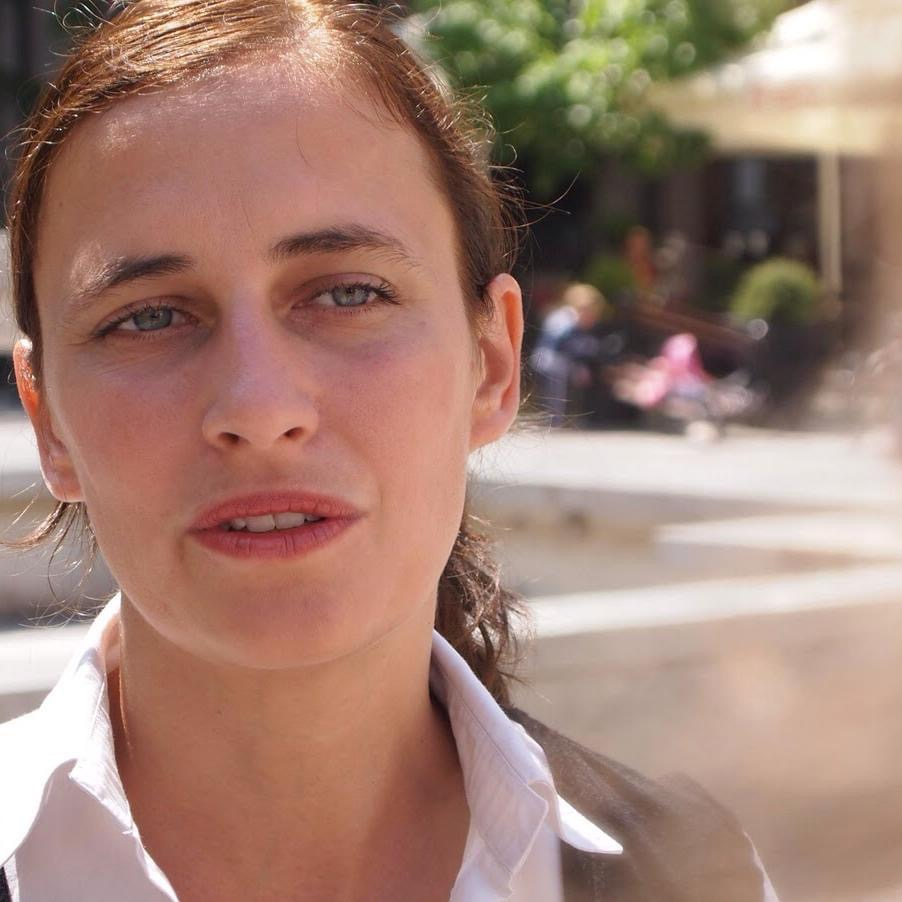
Skrabski in 2021

Fruzsina Annamária Skrabski (born 22 November 1975 in Budapest) is a Hungarian film director, producer, screenwriter, journalist, and university lecturer.

As a filmmaker, Skrabski specializes in the documentary genre. Her works explore Hungarian historical, political, and social themes. Her debut film was Crime without Punishment (Bűn és büntetlenség, 2010), co-directed by Tamás Novák, focusing on Béla Biszku. Another critically acclaimed documentary is Silenced Shame (Elhallgatott gyalázat, 2013), which addresses the wartime sexual violence inflicted by Soviet soldiers upon Hungarian women during World War II.

From May 2022 until her resignation, she served as an adviser to President Katalin Novák.

== Early life and education ==
Skrabski attended Nagy Sándor József Gimnázium. In 1996 she was admitted to the Budapest Media Institute of University of Szeged, where she obtained a degree in communication in 2000. Between 2003 and 2006 she participated in the Communication Program of the Doctoral School of Linguistics at the Faculty of Humanities, University of Pécs.

== Career ==
Between 2000 and 2002, Skrabski worked as a journalist at Magyar Nemzet, first in the foreign affairs and later in the magazine section. At the same time, from 2000 she also served as editor-in-chief of Fészekrakó Magazin. In 2003 she joined Esti Hírlap in the domestic politics section, and from 2004 until 2006 she worked as press officer. In 2008 she also taught at the Pázmány Péter Catholic University, in the Department of Communication.

Together with Tamás Novák she began working on documentary film projects. Their debut documentary film Crime without Punishment (Bűn és büntetlenség) about the communist politician Béla Biszku was released 2010. Between 2011 and 2012 she was editor-director of the online magazine Becsengetünk és elfutunk at Heti Válasz. From 2012 to 2013 she served as director, presenter and producer of the monthly investigative documentary series of the same title at MTVA.

Since 2018 Skrabski has chaired the directors' section of the Magyar Filmakadémia representing creators of television films. In 2023 she became a board member.

== Family ==
Skrabski is married and has one child. Her parents were the renowned physician and psychologist Mária Kopp and sociologist Árpád Skrabski.

== Selected filmography ==
- Crime without Punishment (Bűn és büntetlensé, 2010), documentary that brought Béla Biszku, Hungary's former communist interior minister and a key figure in the post-1956 repression, into the public spotlight, prompting renewed scrutiny of his role
- Silenced Shame (Elhallgatott gyalázat, 2013), screened nationwide and broadcast on Hungarian public television (Duna, M1)
- Victims 2006 (Áldozatok 2006, 2021), documentary on the 2006 police violence against demonstrators in Budapest
- Inherited Shame (Megörökölt gyalázat, 2022), sequel to Silenced Shame, focusing on the descendants of women raped by Soviet soldiers in 1945; the film explores how historical trauma is transmitted across generations

== Book ==
- András Csókay and Fruzina Skrabski, Párbeszéd a megpróbáltatásról – a létről és jelenlétről (2019)

== Awards ==
- Knight's Cross of the Hungarian Order of Merit (2012)
- Budapestért díj of the General Assembly of Budapest (2018)
