= György Szabad =

Hungarian politician

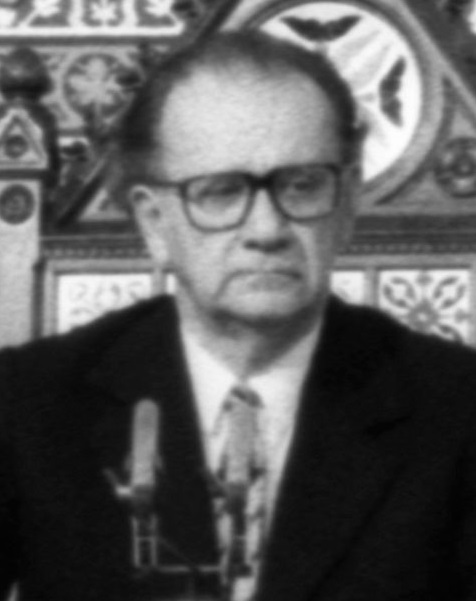
- Szabad in 1990

Speaker of the National Assembly
- In office 3 August 1990 – 27 June 1994
- Preceded by: Árpád Göncz
- Succeeded by: Zoltán Gál

Member of the National Assembly
- In office 2 May 1990 – 17 June 1998

Personal details
- Born: 4 August 1924 Arad, Romania
- Died: 3 July 2015 (aged 90) Budapest, Hungary
- Party: MDF, MDNP
- Spouse(s): Judit Szegő; Andrea Suján (1982-2015)
- Children: Júlia
- Education: Eötvös Loránd University

György Szabad (4 August 1924 – 3 July 2015) was a Hungarian politician and historian, founding member of the Hungarian Democratic Forum (MDF). He was the Speaker of the National Assembly of Hungary between 1990 and 1994. He was a member of the Batthyány Society of Professors.

== Personal life ==
His first wife was Judit Szegő. After their divorce he married Andrea Suján. He had a daughter, Júlia from his second marriage.

== Death ==
He died on 3 July 2015 at the age of 90.

== Honours and awards ==
Ribbon	Name	Year	Notes
-	Széchényi Award	2006	Awarded in recognition of his active participation in the renewal of professional Hungarian historiography, for his work in the best traditions of Hungarian historiography, and in recognition of his life's work.
-	President's Medal for Merit	2005	Awarded for his outstanding creative work, for his political activity, always based on values, in the service of the community.
-	Dr. Hagelmayer István Award	2000	Awarded for his outstanding work as a researcher, historian and public figure in the creation of a new democratic state, and for his contribution to the work of the State Audit Office.
	Grand Cross of the Order of Merit of the Republic of Hungary	2000	Awarded for his role in the preparation of the regime change, for his activities in the creation of parliamentary democracy, for the revival of the best traditions of Hungarian parliamentarianism, and in recognition of his decades-long career of scientific and teaching work.

== Publications ==
- A tatai és gesztesi Esterházy-uradalom (1957)
- Forradalom és kiegyezés válaszútján 1860–61 (1967)
- Hungarian Political Trends… 1849–1867 (1977)
- Kossuth politikai pályája (1977)
- Az önkényuralom kora 1849–1867 (1979)
- Miért halt meg Teleki László? (1985)
- Magyarország önálló államiságának kérdése a polgári átalakulás korában (1986)
- A zsellérilletmény (1987)
- A kormány parlamenti felelősségének kérdése (1998)
- The Conceptualization of a Danubian Federation (1999)
- A parlamentáris kormányzati rendszer megteremtése, védelmezése, és kockáztatása Magyarországon 1848–1867 (2000)
- Kossuth irányadása (2002)
- Egy történész „aforizmáiból” (2005)

Political offices
Preceded by Árpád Göncz	Speaker of the National Assembly; 1990–1994	Succeeded by Zoltán Gál
