= Duna-gate =

Political scandal in Hungary

Duna-gate, also known as Danubegate and Budapest Watergate, was a political scandal in Hungary that emerged in 1990.

The scandal involved the wiretapping of political enemies by the officials within the Communist government's secret services, the state security organisation of the Ministry of Interior, and the shredding of state security documents. Activists had sneaked into government buildings and filmed evidence that surreptitious activities including the secret surveillance of political party leaders and activists were going on even following the October 1989 downfall of the Communist regime precipitated by Mátyás Szűrös's 23 October 1989 declaration that Hungary was a republic.

The Alliance of Free Democrats and the Alliance of Young Democrats held a press conference on 5 January 1990 to release evidence that officials of the state security organisation had collected private information on a number of people, an act made illegal by a 1989 Constitutional amendment. A key figure in the scandal was József Végvári, an intelligence officer within the secret services, who allowed the infiltration. Interior Minister István Horváth resigned due to the scandal.

The scandal was the subject of protests and government investigations, and may have contributed to the poor showing of the Hungarian Socialist Party in the 1990 Hungarian parliamentary election.
