= Balázs Horváth =

Hungarian politician (1942–2006)

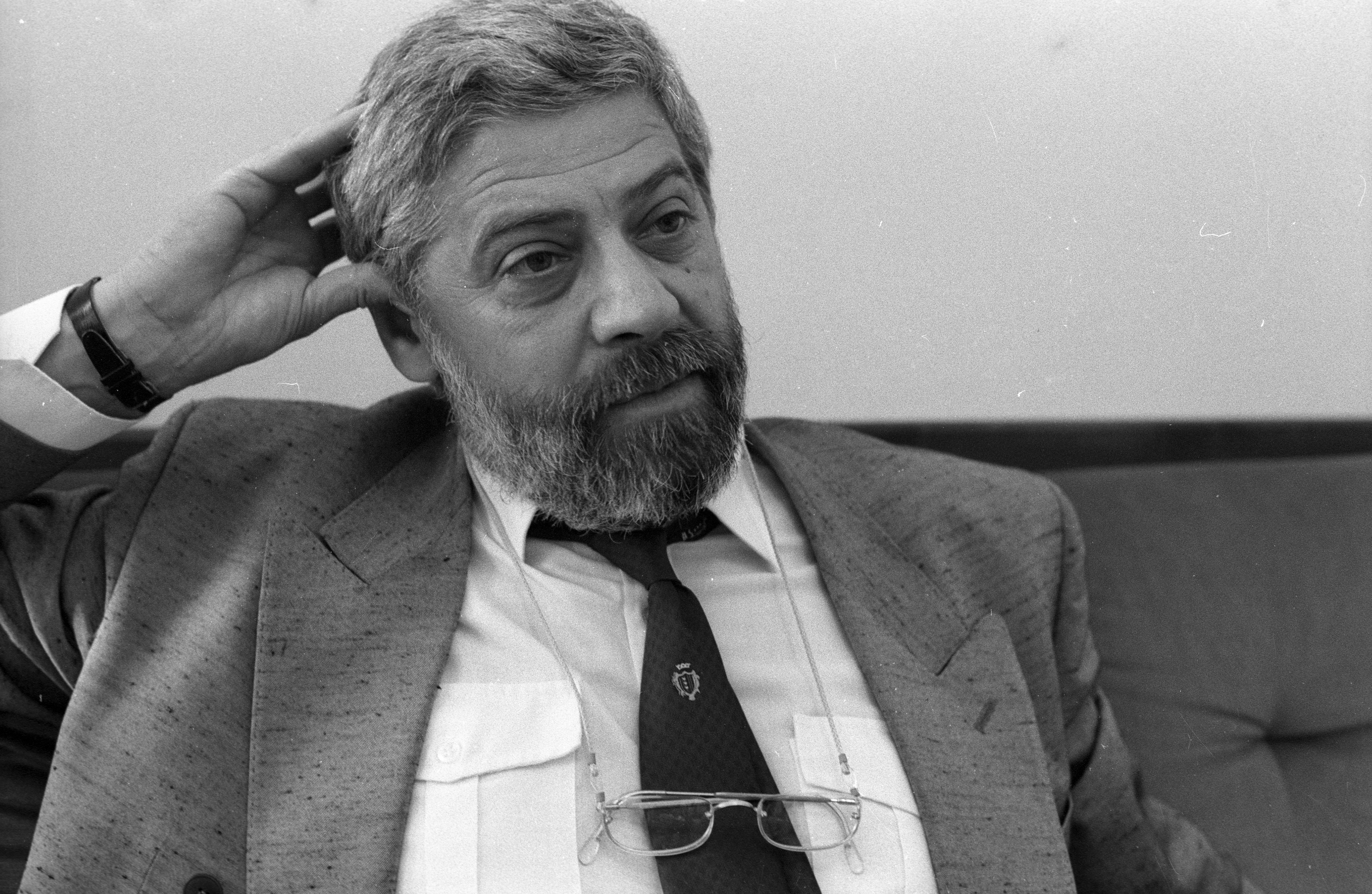

Minister of the Interior of Hungary
- In office 23 May 1990 – 21 December 1990
- Preceded by: Zoltán Gál
- Succeeded by: Péter Boross

Personal details
- Born: 13 August 1942 Budapest, Kingdom of Hungary
- Died: 2 July 2006 (aged 63) Veszprém, Hungary
- Party: MDF, National Forum
- Profession: politician

Balázs Horváth (13 August 1942, Budapest – 2 July 2006) was an Interior minister of Hungary. He was a member of the Hungarian Democratic Forum.

He was a lawyer, a graduate of the Faculty of Law of the Eötvös Loránd University in Budapest. In 1988,

he was among the founders of the Hungarian Democratic Forum, in 1990 for several months served as interior minister in the government of József Antall. Later he left the Hungarian Democratic Forum, for a time was an independent MP, in 2004, he founded the National Forum with several representatives, which entered into a coalition with Fidesz block. On behalf of the Fidesz won a parliamentary mandate in April 2006, but died two months later. His nephew, Zsolt Horváth succeeded him in that position.

Political offices
Preceded by Zoltán Gál	Minister of the Interior; 1990	Succeeded by Péter Boross
