= Zoltán Gál =

Hungarian politician (born 1940)

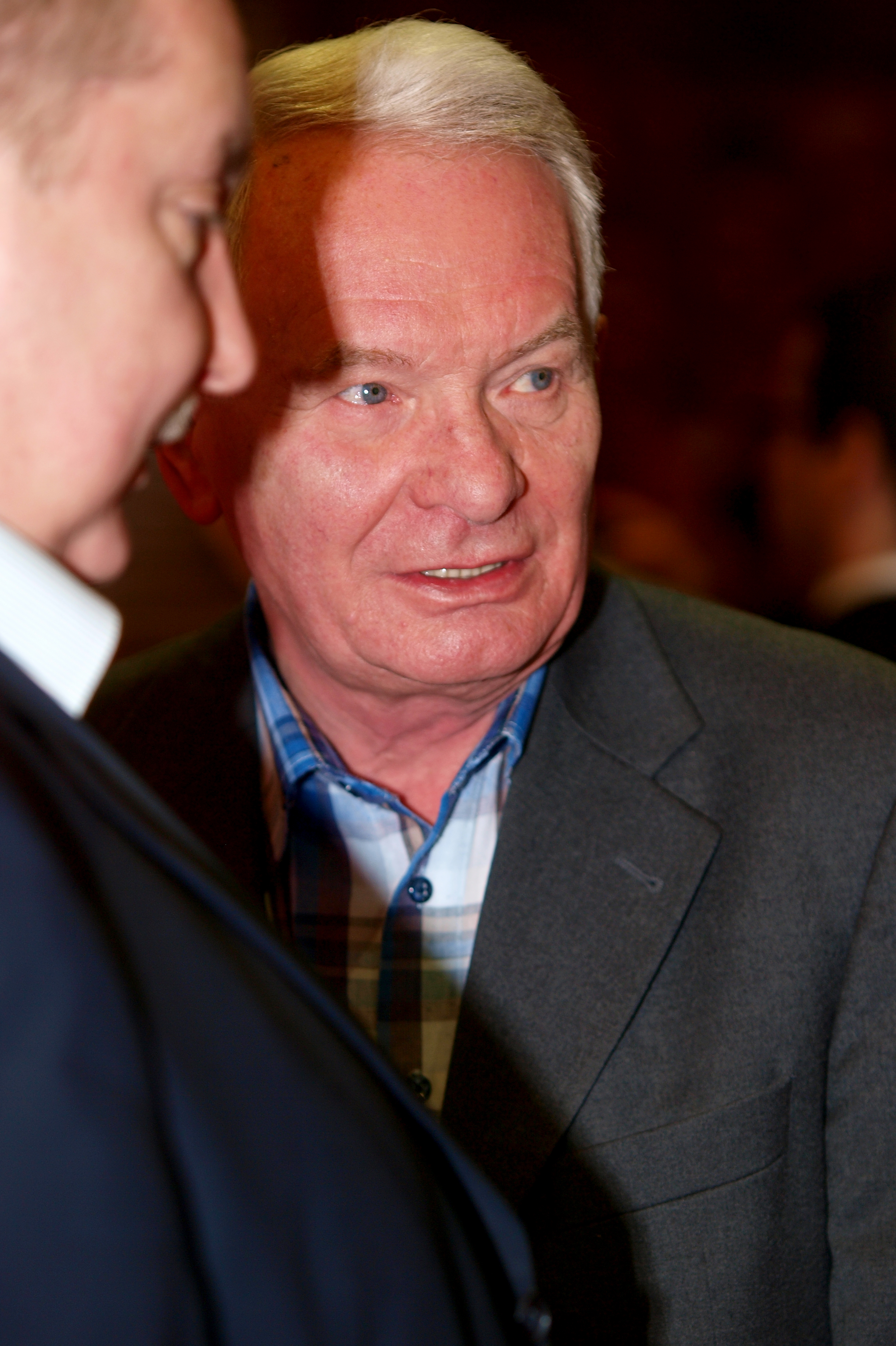
- Gál in 2013

Speaker of the National Assembly
- In office 28 June 1994 – 17 June 1998
- Preceded by: György Szabad
- Succeeded by: János Áder

Minister of the Interior
- In office 23 January 1990 – 23 May 1990
- Prime Minister: Miklós Németh (Provisional)
- Preceded by: István Horváth
- Succeeded by: Balázs Horváth

Personal details
- Born: 10 December 1940 (age 85) Budapest, Hungary
- Party: MSZMP, MSZP
- Spouse: Krisztina Pölz
- Children: Zoltán
- Profession: politician

Zoltán Gál (born 10 December 1940) is a Hungarian politician, who served as Interior Minister for a short time in 1990 before the first parliamentary elections. He was the Speaker of the National Assembly of Hungary between 1994 and 1998. His son is Zoltán J. Gál former spokesman of the Hungarian Socialist Party government.

Political offices
Preceded by István Horváth	Minister of the Interior; 1990	Succeeded by Balázs Horváth
Preceded by György Szabad	Speaker of the National Assembly; 1994–1998	Succeeded by János Áder
Party political offices
Preceded by Imre Pozsgay	Leader of the MSZP parliamentary group 1990–1994	Succeeded by Imre Szekeres
