= Zsolt Horváth (politician, born 1969) =

Hungarian jurist and politician

Member of the National Assembly
- In office 9 October 2006 – 5 May 2014

Personal details
- Born: 29 March 1969 (age 57) Veszprém, Hungary
- Party: Fidesz (since 2005)
- Profession: jurist, politician

Zsolt Horváth (born March 29, 1969) is a Hungarian jurist and politician, member of the National Assembly (MP) for Veszprém (Veszprém County Constituency VI) between 2006 and 2014.

He studied law at the Pázmány Péter Catholic University between 1997 and 2002. He joined Fidesz in 2005. He won a mandate to the National Assembly in a by-election, replacing his uncle Balázs Horváth, a former Minister of the Interior, who died on July 2, 2006. He became also Member of Parliament for Veszprém during the 2010 Hungarian parliamentary election. He was a member of the Constitutional, Judicial and Standing Orders Committee since 2006, therefore he participated in the drawing up of the new constitution in 2011.
