= House of Reconciliation =

Coordinates: 47°36′10″N 19°04′06″E

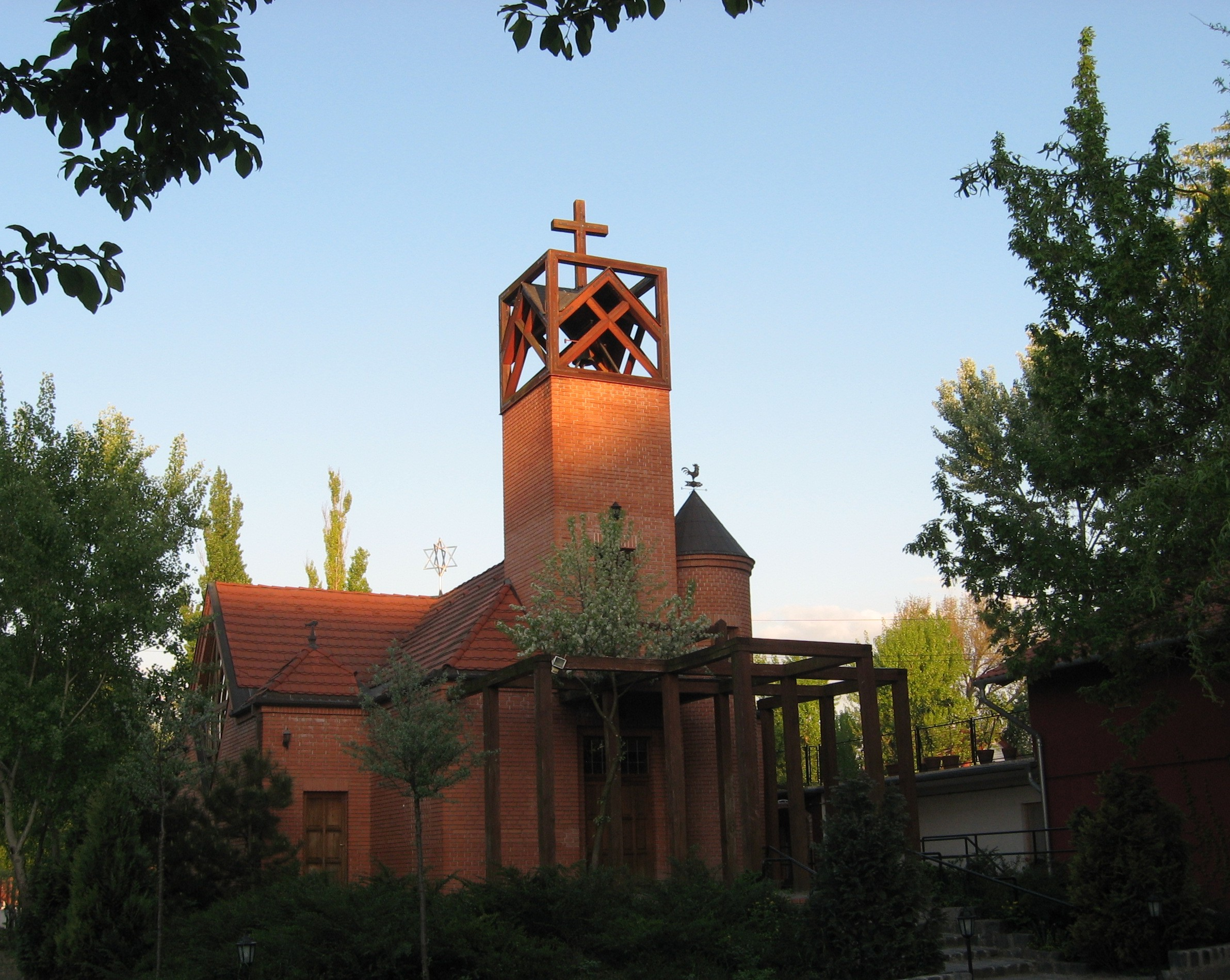
House of Reconciliation

The House of Reconciliation is a church of the Hungarian Evangelical Fellowship in Budapest, Békásmegyer.

== History ==
The Fellowship is a free, Evangelical Church based on Methodist principles of faith. It is heir to the Movement initiated by the theologian and pastor John Wesley, organized into an independent Methodist Church at the end of the 18th century. The Fellowship was established in the mid-seventies as a result of the refusal to co-operate with the notorious Office of Church Affairs by a group within the Hungarian Methodist Church, followed by their secession. As a consequence, their churches were impropriated and their ministers were given suspended sentences of imprisonment. After eight years of persecution they were finally recognized by the state on 1 October 1981. The small community, numbering approximately 3000 members, is served country-wide by ten pastors.

Among its institutions is the John Wesley Theological College, where 500 students study theology, ministry, teaching of religion, social work and environmental security. It supports one-parent families, three hostels for the homeless and a hospital which was visited by Queen Elizabeth II in 1993.

Divine services were held by a converted, former public house. In 1992 they received a plot of land measuring 5,500 m^{2} to build a church and lay out a park. The poor-quality soil is being cleaned continuously, so far 1,000 trees, shrubs and pines have been planted.

For the design of the church the planning office of Bálint Nagy & Co. and for the building the contractors Zsigmond & Co. have been appointed. Work was completed by Tulát Ltd. Partnership in 1998 on the basis of a modified plan and was consecrated by the President of the Church, Tibor Iványi on 1 October. Costs were borne by the Foundation for the House of Reconciliation, the Capital Budapest, the Municipality of the 3rd district and the Church. Locality of the planned parsonage is to be ascertained.

== Description ==
The small church, comprising 500 m^{2}, professes the brotherhood of Christian and Jewish religion by the repeated representation of the Cross, the Star of David, and Moses’ Tablets of Stone, both outside and inside the building. The walls of the interior, which radiates a warm, friendly atmosphere, are built from brick, the ceiling is faced by wood. It has a traditional cross plan. The pews, made of larch, turn towards the altar in V-form, separated by a nave, on their front and on the Moses-chair we see the Star of David. The upper part of the side of the pews is carved in the form of two semicircles, reminiscent of Moses’ Tablets, with a cross underneath each. The Menorah is depicted on the window on the right, a picture of the ship the "preserver" is on the left one. Moses’ Tablets appear again above the altar. An ornament of the chancel is a living vine-plant behind the altar, its branches climbing up on a T-shaped cross, symbolising Nature, with large stones at its foot and the light streaming in from above through a large V-shaped glass roof. Beside the small Lord’s Table, on the left is a red copper baptismal font, on its right is the pulpit. A concert is being held on the last Monday of each month. The bell (weighing 80 kg) is a Dutch donation, received through the Capital.

Opposite the altar, projecting from the gallery is the fine, old organ, assembled from several parts received from various places (Solt, Nagykőrös), based on the work of the renowned Angster organ factory of Pécs.
