= János Pap =

Hungarian politician (1925–1994)

Minister of the Interior of Hungary
- In office 13 September 1961 – 7 December 1963
- Preceded by: Béla Biszku
- Succeeded by: András Benkei

Personal details
- Born: 23 December 1925
- Died: 22 February 1994 (aged 68)
- Party: MSZMP
- Profession: politician

János Pap (23 December 1925 – 22 February 1994) was a Hungarian communist politician, who served as Interior Minister between 1961–1963. Member of the Central Committee of the Hungarian Socialist Workers' Party (1959–1985). First secretary of the HSWP in Veszprém county (1956–1961, 1965–1985). Pap committed suicide.

Political offices
Preceded by Béla Biszku	Minister of the Interior; 1961–1963	Succeeded by András Benkei
