= Dezső Nemes =

Hungarian politician, journalist, and historian

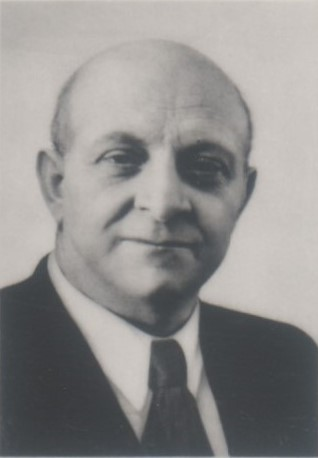
Dezső Nemes in 1967

Dezső Nemes (6 September 1908 – 30 March 1985) was a Hungarian communist politician, journalist and historian.

== Biography ==
Nemes was born in to the family of a customs officer. He lost his parents in 1919, and was sent to live with his uncle in Budapest. In early 1926, he worked as an upholsterer's assistant and joined the woodworkers' union and in the fall of the same year he also became a member of the illegally operating Hungarian Communist Party. However, he was soon dismissed, and in 1927 he was sent to the brick factory in Újpest, where he worked as a bricklayer, but was injured while working, so he became unable to work for a while. In the second half of 1927, he participated in the reorganization of the Hungarian Communist Youth Workers' Association and in 1928 he became secretary of the Central Committee. He was arrested in August 1928 for his illegal political activities and sentenced to three years in prison in 1930, but the time spent in pretrial detention was later credited so he was released in 1931, after which he emigrated to the Soviet Union. From September 1931 to 1933, he studied at the International Lenin School in Moscow. In mid-1933, he returned to his homeland, illegally, and worked as the secretary of the Budapest committee of the Communist Party of Hungary and a member of the Central Committee in Budapest. In 1936, he traveled back to the Soviet Union and studied history at Moscow State University from 1939 to 1943.

After the start of Operation Barbarossa, he became an agent of the Communist International and became an instructor in the Hungarian group of the Comintern School. After the dissolution of the Comintern he carried out political agitation work for two years in Hungarian prisoner-of-war camps and in the Krasnogorsk prisoner-of-war school, of which he was also the director for a while. He completed his higher education in 1943 at the Binsk College. In 1945, he edited the prisoner-of-war newspaper Igaz Szó for a few months. He returned to Hungary that same year.

Between 1945 and 1948, he worked as the secretary of the National Council of Trade Unions. Nemes was also involved in the editing of the Cominform newspaper For a Lasting Peace, For a People's Pemocracy!. Between 1950 and 1953, he was the head of department of the Ministry of Popular Culture, from 1953 to 1956, he was the director of the Szikra Publishing House, and in 1956, the Party College. In 1956, after the invasion of Soviet troops, he joined the new leadership of János Kádár. Initially, he worked in the party headquarters, and between 1957 and 1961, he headed the editorial board of Népszabadság.

From June 29, 1957, he was an alternate member of the Central Committee of the MSZMP, and from December 5, 1959, a full member, until March 27, 1980. In 1958, he was elected a corresponding member of the Hungarian Academy of Sciences, and in 1964, a full member. In 1982, he became an external member of the Academy of Sciences of the Soviet Union. Between September 19, 1961, and June 25, 1965, he worked as the Secretary of the Central Committee, supervising the Foreign Affairs Department of the Central Committee, the Central Control Committee, the Party History Institute, the editorial office of the Social Review. He became a member of the Agitation and Propaganda Committee of the Central Committee in early 1960. He held the position of Director General of the Party History Institute until December 5, 1966. He then served as the Director of the Political College of the Hungarian Socialist Workers' Party until 1975, and then as its Rector until April 13, 1977. In 1977, he was again appointed editor-in-chief of Népszabadság, and in May 1980, director of the Party History Institute, after he was left out of the Politburo at the 12th party congress. He retired in July 1983.

== Works ==
- A szakszervezeti mozgalom; MKP, Bp., 1946 (Szemináriumi füzetek)
- A szakszervezetek feladatai; Szakszervezeti Tanács–Munka, Bp., 1947 (A Szakszervezeti Tanács alapfokú szemináriuma)
- Nemzetközi munkásmozgalom. 1-2. rész; Szikra, Bp., 1947 (Munka és tudás könyvtára)
- A Szakszervezeti Világszövetség működése. Beszámoló a Szakszervezeti Világszövetség főtanácsának 1. ülésszakáról. Prága, 1947. VI. 7-14.; Szakszervezeti Tanács., Bp., 1947 (A munka könyvtára)
- A községi tanácsok népművelési feladatai; Jogi, Bp., 1952
- Az Általános Munkásegylet története 1868–1873 (Budapest, 1952)
- Az ellenforradalom hatalomrajutása és rémuralma Magyarországon 1919-1921; szerk., bev. Nemes Dezső; Szikra, Bp., 1953 (Iratok az ellenforradalom történetéhez)
- A Kommunisták Magyarországi Pártjának harca 1919 augusztusától 1929 őszéig; Szikra, Bp., 1954 (Az MDP Pártfőiskolája Magyar Párttörténeti Tanszék)
- A Szovjetunió iránti szeretet és bizalom a magyar nép tömegeiben. 1919-1945; Szikra, Bp., 1954 (Magyar Történészkongresszus, 1953. június 6-13. előadásaiból)
- A hazafiság kérdése és a jobboldali jelenségek; Szikra, Bp., 1955
- Magyarország felszabadulása; Szikra, Bp., 1955
- Fehér könyvek I-IV. - a Minisztertanács Tájékoztatási Hivatala adta ki négy kötetben Ellenforradalmi erők a magyar októberi eseményekben címmel. Az első kötet 1956 novemberében jelent meg, a kiadásáról szóló MSZMP-határozat nem maradt fenn. A szerkesztőbizottság tagjai: Betlen Oszkár, Darvasi István, Fellegi Tamás, Lovas Márton, Nemes Dezső, Nemes János, Orbán László, Szirmai István.
- A magyarországi revizionizmus kifejlődése, mint az ellenforradalom eszmei előkészítésének szerves része; Akadémiai, Bp., 1958
- A Magyar Tanácsköztársaság történelmi jelentősége; Akadémiai, Bp., 1959
- A népi Magyarország 15 éves fejlődése (Budapest, 1960, 1961)
- Magyarország felszabadulása Magyarország fejlődése a felszabadulás után; 2., jav. kiad.; Kossuth, Bp., 1960
- A kommunizmus építésének elvi kérdései; Kossuth, Bp., 1962 (Az MSZMP Központi Bizottsága politikai akadémiája)
- Az ellenforradalom története Magyarországon 1919–1921 (Budapest, 1962)
- A Bethlen-kormány külpolitikája 1927-1931-ben. Az aktív külpolitika kifejlődése és kudarca; Kossuth, Bp., 1964
- A nemzetközi kommunista mozgalom időszerű kérdései; Kossuth, Bp., 1964 (Az MSZMP Központi Bizottsága politikai akadémiája)
- A nemzetközi helyzet és a kommunista világmozgalom; Kossuth, Bp., 1965 (Az MSZMP Központi Bizottsága politikai akadémiája)
- A szocialista demokrácia fejlődése Magyarországon; Vasas soksz., Bp., 1965
- A magyar forradalmi munkásmozgalom története, 1-3.; szerk. biz. vez. Nemes Dezső; Kossuth, Bp., 1966-1970
- A lenini eszmék ereje (Budapest, 1970)
- A magyar munkásmozgalom történetéhez. Tények, viták, tanulságok (Budapest, 1974)
- A fasizmus kérdéséhez; Magvető, Bp., 1976 (Gyorsuló idő)
- Észrevételek Borsányi György: Kun Béla politikai életrajza c. munkájához; Athenaeum Ny., Bp., 1979
- Forradalmak és Tanácsköztársaság Magyarországon. 1918–1919 (Budapest, 1979)
- A biatorbágyi merénylet és ami mögötte van… (Budapest, 1981)
- Az 1919. januári politikai válság Magyarországon és a munkáspártok; Kossuth Kiadó soksz., Bp., 1983
- Kun Béla és a Tanácsköztársaság; Kossuth Kiadó soksz., Bp., 1984
- Kun Béla Tanácsköztársaság utáni tevékenységéről; Kossuth Kiadó soksz., Bp., 1984
- Kun Béla politikai életútjáról (Budapest, 1985)
- Történelem és jelenkor Az MSZMP és az SZKP nemzetközi együttműködése; főszerk. Huszár István, Nemes Dezső, A. G. Jegorov, bev. V. G. Kolicsev et al.; Kossuth, Bp., 1989
