= Zoltán Komócsin =

Hungarian communist politician

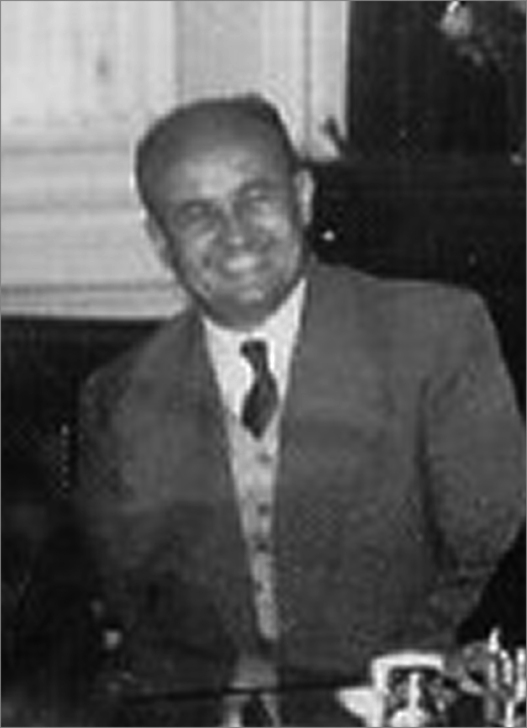
- Zoltán Komócsin in 1961

Personal details
- Born: 18 March 1923 Tatabánya, Hungary
- Died: 28 May 1974 (aged 51) Budapest, Hungary
- Party: MKP (1945–1948); MDP (1948–1956); MSZMP (1956–)
- Profession: Politician, journalist

Zoltán Komócsin (18 April 1923 – 28 May 1974) was a Hungarian communist politician and journalist.

== Biography ==
Komócsin was born in to the family of a construction worker and union leader. His younger brother Mihály also became a politician.

After completing the six elementary grades, he worked as a day laborer, apprentice, and later as a commercial employee until 1944. He was brought into contact with the communist movement by his father at a young age; In October 1944, he started working on the establishment of the Szeged organization of the Communist Youth Workers' Union of Hungary (KIMSZ). At the beginning of 1945, he organized the Hungarian Democratic Youth Association (MADISZ), which was under communist control.

In 1945, he studied at the party school of the Hungarian Communist Party (MKP) in Debrecen. From 1945 to 1948, he was the organizing secretary of the party committee of the MKP in Szeged. From June to December 1948, he was an employee of the Secretariat of the Hungarian Working People's Party (MDP) Central Leadership, and from December 1948 to June 1949, he was the secretary of the Vas County Committee of the MDP. In 1949 he was elected to the National Assembly and remained a member until his death.

From June 1949 to October 1950 and between January 1953 and the beginning of 1954 he was deputy head of the Central Committee propaganda department, and from the beginning of 1954 to December 1955, he was its head. Meanwhile, between 1950 and 1953, he studied at the CPSU Moscow Party College, where he obtained a diploma.

From 1955 to December and 1957 he was the first secretary of the Party Committee in Hajdú Bihar county. During the Hungarian Revolution in 1956, he took part in the suppression of the uprising. In March 1957, Komócsin was appointed chairman of the organizing committee to rebuild the Hungarian Communist Youth League (KISZ), the youth organization of the Hungarian Socialist Workers' Party (MSZMP) which had emerged from the MDP after the popular uprising. After the reorganization was completed, he became First Secretary of the KISZ and held this position until he was replaced by Árpád Pullai in September 1961. On February 26, 1957, he also became a member of the Central Committee of the MSZMP and on June 29, 1957, he was elected a candidate member of the Politburo of the Central Committee. Together with Gyula Hegyi and Sándor Gáspár, he was also president of the National Olympic Committee (MOB) between 1958 and 1962.

Between September 1961 and June 1965, Komócsin was the editor-in-chief of Népszabadság. In June 1965, Komócsin became Secretary of the Central Committee of the MSZMP and held this party office until his death.

In the MSZMP Komócsin belonged to the so-called "Muscovite" faction alongside Béla Biszku, which opposed the implementation of the New Economic Mechanism in 1968. He was a fierce debater, attacking the reform policy of János Kádár and the Fock government as a hardliner within the party. He died suddenly of a stroke in 1974. His grave is located in Budapest, in the Kerepesi cemetery.
