= Ilk =

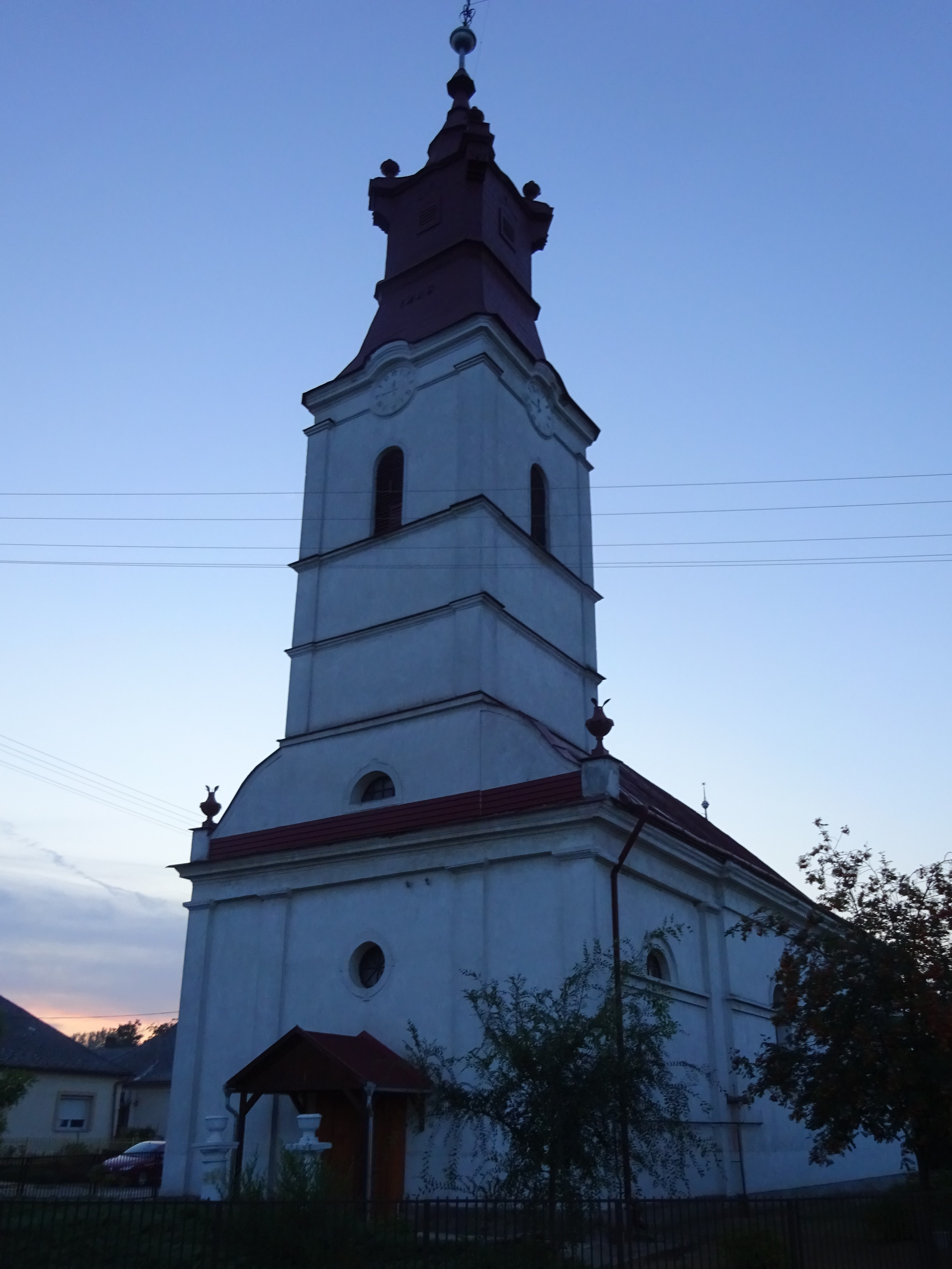

- Location of Ilk in Hungary.
- Country: Hungary
- Region: Northern Great Plain
- County: Szabolcs-Szatmár-Bereg
- District: Vásárosnamény District

Government
  - Mayor: Peter Nagy

Area
  - Total: 14.56 km^{2} (5.62 sq mi)

Population (2022)
  - Total: 1,214
  - Density: 83.38/km^{2} (216.0/sq mi)
- Time zone: UTC+1 (CET)
  - Summer (DST): UTC+2 (CEST)
- Postal code: 4566
- Area code: 45

Ilk is a village in Szabolcs-Szatmár-Bereg county, in the Northern Great Plain region of eastern Hungary.

== Geography ==
It covers an area of 14.56 km^{2} (6 sq mi) and has a population of 1214 people (2022 census).
