= Gemini (Hungarian band) =

Hungarian rock band

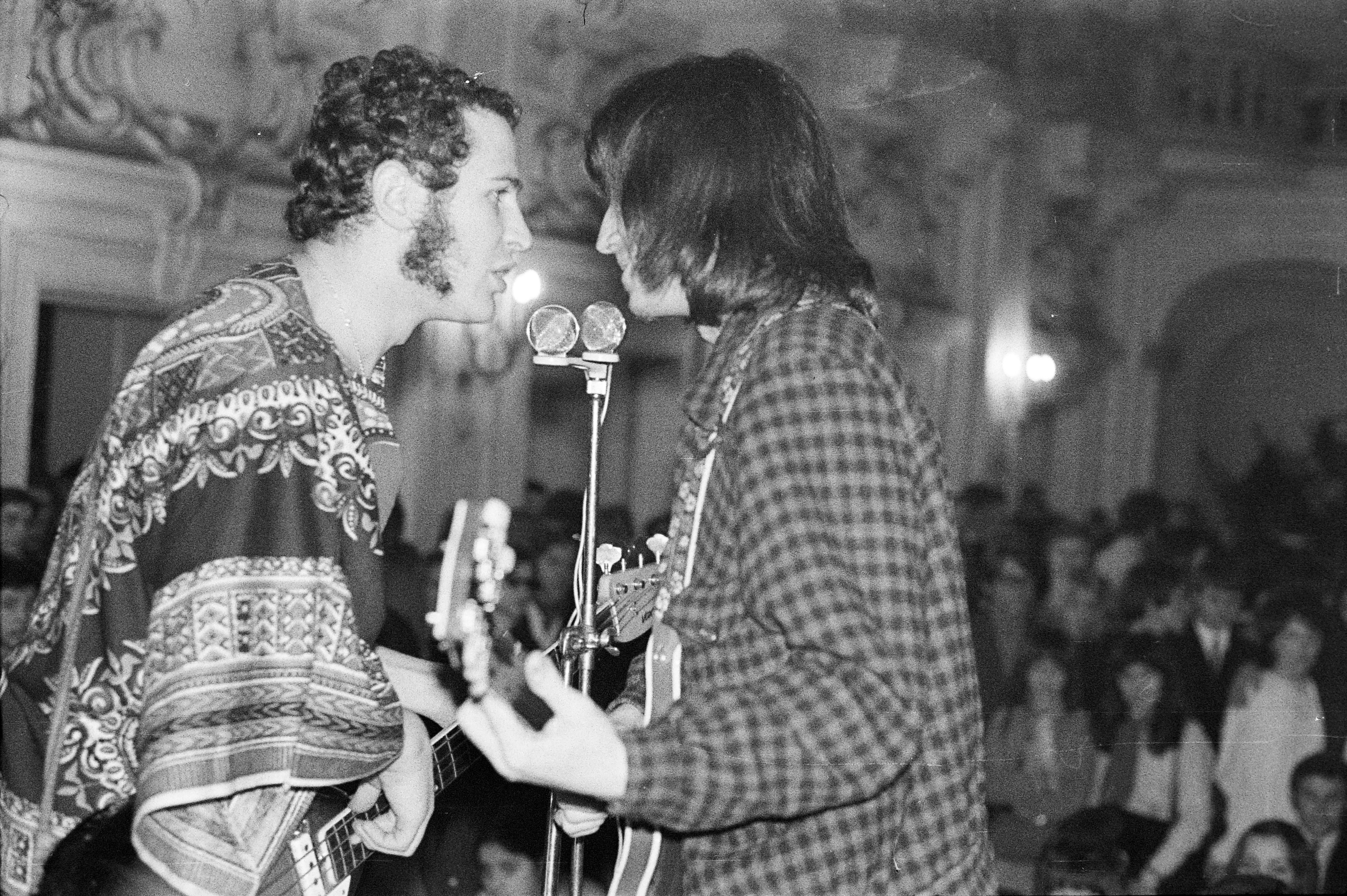
Gemini (Hungarian band)

Gemini is a Hungarian rock band established in 1965 and reformed in 1979. Their first LP was released in 1976.

== Members ==
- Gábor Várszegi (bass, 1965–79)
- Gyula Bardóczi (drums, 1965–79)
- György Szabó (vocals, 1965–75)
- Gábor Pusztai (guitar, 1965–79)
- Zoltán Kékes (guitar, 1969–72)
- András Markó (organ, 1969–71, 1973-?)
- Iván Rusznák (guitar, 1971–79)
- Imre Papp (keyboards, vocals, 1971–81)
- László Baranszky (guitar, 1972–79)
- Gábor Heilig (bass, vocals, 1975–79)
- Gábor Dávid (drums, 1979-?)
- Edit Szigeti (guitar, 1979-?)
- Gábor Albert (bass, 1979-?)

== Discography ==
=== Studio albums ===
- Gemini (1976)

=== Singles ===
- Aki soha nem próbálta / Nem nyugszik a szívem (SP 964, 1972)
- Lívia (other side: Victor Máté: Szólj a fűre, fákra) (SP 988, 1972)
- Vándorlás a hosszú úton / Neked csak egy idegen (SP 70113, 1973)
- Ki mondja meg (other side: Syconor: Kék égből szőtt szerelem) (SP 70139, 1973)
- Ez a dal lesz az üzenet (other side: Apostol: Gyere, gyere, gyorsan) (SP 70192, 1975)
- Rock and Roll / Hogyha újból gyerek lennék (SPS 70184, 1975)
- Álomvonat (other side: Illés: Hogyha egyszer (SPS 70275, 1977)
- Félek (other side: M 7: Mondd meg bátran) (SPS 70422, 1980)

== Sources ==
- Ki kicsoda a magyar rockzenében?
- Gemini Allmusic.hu
