= Hope Educational Foundation =

Hope Educational Foundation International, Inc.
- Founded: 2004
- Founder: George Mansour Hoskins
- Type: Children and education organization
- Headquarters: Pompano Beach, Florida
- Region served: South Africa; United States
- Key people: George Hoskins, President; John McB. Hodgson, M.D., Chairman of the Board; Emma Gebert, Program Director; Magali Hoffiz, Operations Manager; Karen Powell, Director of Finance
- Website: www.hopeeducation.org

Hope Educational Foundation (HEF) aims to protect children by teaching them the knowledge, skills, and convictions that they will need to combat systemic threats like HIV/AIDS and intestinal worms. They serve in areas like Swaziland, South Africa, and Togo. In 2008, 27,431 children were fed through partnership with Food for Peace in Swaziland. In 2008, HEF was awarded a 5-year, $5 million PEPFAR Grant to implement the HIV prevention education program, iMatter in South Africa. Between 2008 and 2012, approximately 1.7 million children were reached with iMatter in South Africa. 21,442 South African public school teachers were trained with HIV prevention, education knowledge, and skills. In 2010, HEF was requested by Centers for Disease Control and Prevention to implement the Families Matter! Program pilot in South Africa They also just begun implementation of Project AIM, another CDC program designed to reduce HIV risk among youth ages 11 to 14. It indirectly targets HIV while directly targeting how youth conceptualize their futures.

HEF has developed a hygiene education curriculum called Hygiene Matters. The current edition is in French and was designed for use in francophone Africa, specifically based on validation performed in the Central African Republic.
