= István Horváth =

Hungarian politician (born 1935)

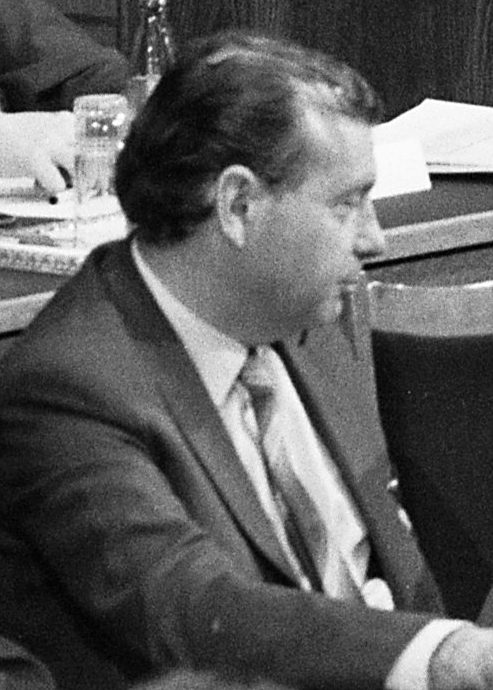
- István Horváth in 1986

Minister of the Interior of Hungary
- In office 27 June 1980 – 29 March 1985
- Preceded by: András Benkei
- Succeeded by: János Kamara
- In office 16 December 1987 – 23 January 1990
- Preceded by: János Kamara
- Succeeded by: Zoltán Gál

Personal details
- Born: 1 September 1935 (age 89); Paks, Hungary
- Political party: MSZMP
- Profession: politician

István Horváth (1 September 1935, Paks) is a former Hungarian communist politician, who served as Interior Minister twice: between 1980–1985 and between 1987 and 1990.

Horvath studied law at ELTE. He joined the MSZMP in 1956. He was the first secretary of KISZ (1970–1973), first secretary of the MSZMP Party Committee in Bács-Kiskun County (1973–1980), member of the Central Committee (1970–1989), secretary of the latter (1985–1987). Member of the Hungarian Parliament (1971–1975) and of the Presidential Council (1971–1975).

He was first interior minister between 1980–1985. He tried some careful reforms. On the other hand, he participated in the creation of CC-decisions concerning the opposition, and in his time was Carlos in Hungary, although Horváth opposed Carlos's visit in Hungary. Horváth's second period as interior minister (1987–1990) has no special characteristic. He submitted his resignation when it became clear that the secret police kept the opposition under surveillance even in the last days of the Kádár regime.

Political offices
Preceded by András Benkei	Minister of the Interior; 1980–1985	Succeeded by János Kamara
Preceded by János Kamara	Minister of the Interior; 1987–1990	Succeeded by Zoltán Gál
