= Gemzse =

Coordinates: 48°08′N 22°12′E

- Interactive map of Gemzse
- Country: Hungary
- County: Szabolcs-Szatmár-Bereg

Area
  - Total: 13.60 km^{2} (5.25 sq mi)

Population (2015)
  - Total: 930
  - Density: 68.6/km^{2} (178/sq mi)
- Time zone: UTC+1 (CET)
  - Summer (DST): UTC+2 (CEST)
- Postal code: 4567
- Area code: 45

Location of Szabolcs-Szatmar-Bereg county in Hungary

Gemzse is a village in Szabolcs-Szatmár-Bereg county, in the Northern Great Plain region of eastern Hungary. It is mentioned in archival sources as far back as 1347. For many centuries, until the liberation of the serfs, the land was mainly owned by the Karolyi counts.

Gemzse is in an agricultural region, with a distinctive sandy yellow soil. This is ideal for crops such as potato and tobacco, which predominate. The town is noted for the free-standing belfry of the Protestant church. It dates from 1789, and was constructed with wooden spikes without any metal nails. The advantage of the free-standing belfry, found in many villages in the area, is that the bell can easily be rung from ground level.

In the late 1800s, about 10% of Gemzse's population consisted of Jewish farmers, which is unusual for Europe, where Jews were mainly in trade. During the Holocaust, the Nazis murdered most of Hungary's Jews, including the village's Jews, today no Jews remain, but the Jewish cemetery has been preserved, and is located across the road from the Christian cemetery.

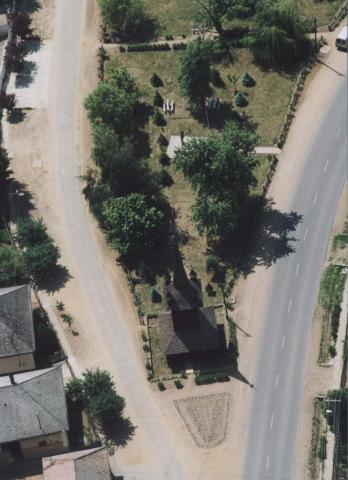
Aerial photography of the Belfry

== Geography ==
It covers an area of 13.60 km^{2} (5 sq mi) and has a population of 930 people (2015).
