= Gulács =

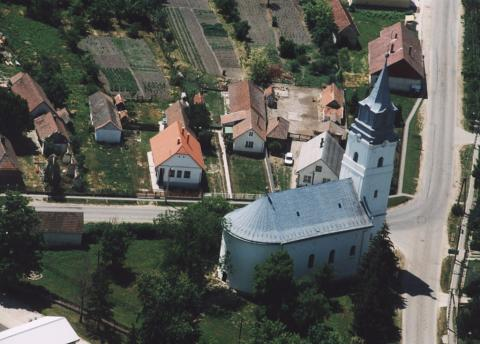
- Aerial photo of Gulács

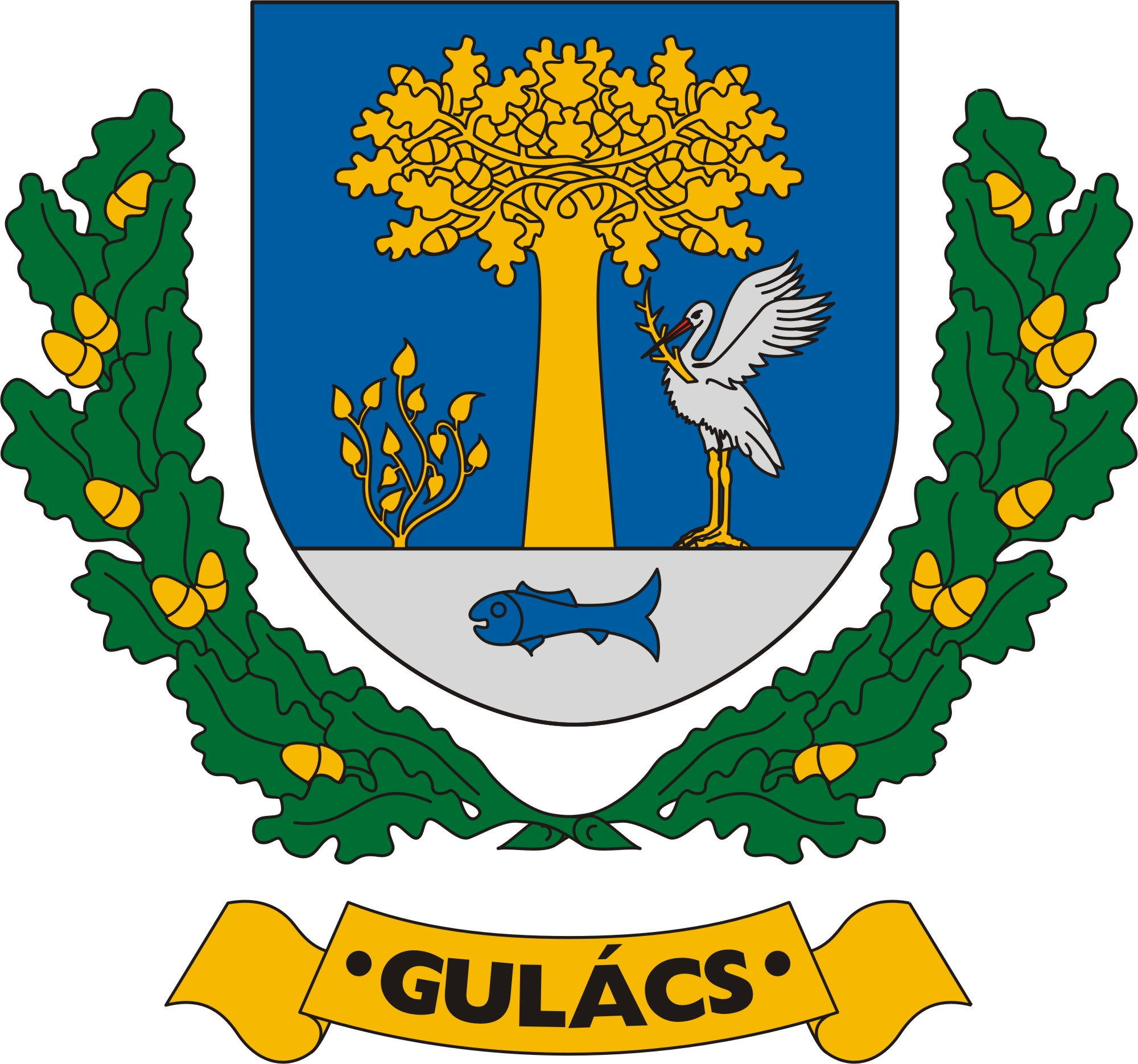
- Coat of arms

- Location of Gulács in Hungary
- Coordinates: 48.08°N 22.47°E
- Country: Hungary
- Region: Northern Great Plain
- County: Szabolcs-Szatmár-Bereg

Area
  - Total: 23.35 km^{2} (9.02 sq mi)

Population (2014)
  - Total: 838
  - Density: 35.9/km^{2} (93.0/sq mi)
- Time zone: UTC+1 (CET)
  - Summer (DST): UTC+2 (CEST)
- Postal code: 4842
- Area code: +36 45
- Website: http://www.gulacs.hu/

Gulács is a village in Szabolcs–Szatmár–Bereg county, in the Northern Great Plain region of eastern Hungary.

== History ==
=== The Jewish community ===
Jews began to settle in Gulács at the beginning of the 20th century. Most of them owned farms and a minority were engaged in trade and craft. There was a synagogue and a Jewish cemetery.

In 1941, six young Jews from the village were recruited for forced labor. Three of them died.

In 1944, after the German occupation, all the Jews were transferred to the Berehove ghetto, where about 10,000 Jews living in the area were concentrated. In mid-May, they were sent to the Auschwitz extermination camp.

After the war, only two Jewish women who left soon returned to Gulács. The synagogue and the Jewish cemetery were not damaged in the war.

== Population ==
Population of Gulács
Census Year	Population
1980-01-01	1,237
1990-01-01	1,069
2001-02-01	951
2011-10-01	879
2014-01-01	838
