= Hetefejércse =

Coordinates: 48°07′N 22°29′E

- Interactive map of Hetefejércse
- Country: Hungary
- County: Szabolcs-Szatmár-Bereg

Area
  - Total: 15.45 km^{2} (5.97 sq mi)

Population (2015)
  - Total: 295
  - Density: 19.1/km^{2} (49/sq mi)
- Time zone: UTC+1 (CET)
  - Summer (DST): UTC+2 (CEST)
- Postal code: 4843
- Area code: 44

Location of Szabolcs-Szatmar-Bereg county in Hungary

Hetefejércse is a village in Szabolcs-Szatmár-Bereg county, in the Northern Great Plain region of eastern Hungary.

== Geography ==
It covers an area of 15.45 km^{2} (6 sq mi) and has a population of 295 people (2015).
