= Gyüre =

Coordinates: 48°11′N 22°17′E

- Interactive map of Gyüre
- Country: Hungary
- County: Szabolcs-Szatmár-Bereg

Area
  - Total: 15.98 km^{2} (6.17 sq mi)

Population (2015)
  - Total: 1,244
  - Density: 78.4/km^{2} (203/sq mi)
- Time zone: UTC+1 (CET)
  - Summer (DST): UTC+2 (CEST)
- Postal code: 4813
- Area code: 45

Location of Szabolcs-Szatmar-Bereg county in Hungary

Gyüre is a village in Szabolcs-Szatmár-Bereg county, in the Northern Great Plain region of eastern Hungary.

== Geography ==
It covers an area of 15.98 km^{2} (6 sq mi) and has a population of 1244 people (2015).
