= Jánd =

Coordinates: 48°07′N 22°23′E

- Interactive map of Jánd
- Country: Hungary
- County: Szabolcs-Szatmár-Bereg

Area
  - Total: 16.51 km^{2} (6.37 sq mi)

Population (2015)
  - Total: 778
  - Density: 51.54/km^{2} (133.5/sq mi)
- Time zone: UTC+1 (CET)
  - Summer (DST): UTC+2 (CEST)
- Postal code: 4841
- Area code: 45

Location of Szabolcs-Szatmar-Bereg county in Hungary

Jánd is a village in Szabolcs-Szatmár-Bereg county, in the Northern Great Plain region of eastern Hungary.

== Geography ==
It covers an area of 16.51 km^{2} (6 sq mi) and has a population of 778 people (2015).

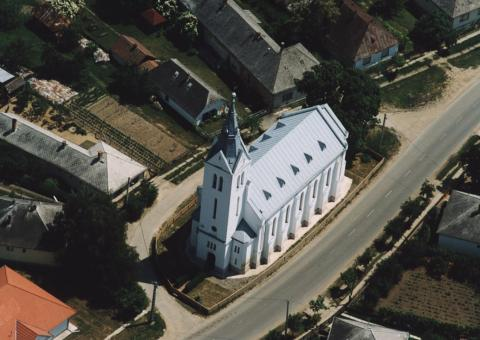
Reformed Church, Jánd from a bird's eye view
