= Márokpapi =

Coordinates: 48°09′N 22°31′E

- Interactive map of Márokpapi
- Country: Hungary
- County: Szabolcs-Szatmár-Bereg

Area
  - Total: 21.18 km^{2} (8.18 sq mi)

Population (2015)
  - Total: 523
  - Density: 24.7/km^{2} (64/sq mi)
- Time zone: UTC+1 (CET)
  - Summer (DST): UTC+2 (CEST)
- Postal code: 4932
- Area code: 45

Location of Szabolcs-Szatmar-Bereg county in Hungary

Márokpapi is a village in Szabolcs-Szatmár-Bereg county, in the Northern Great Plain region of eastern Hungary.

Jews lived in Márokpapi for many years until they were murdered in the Holocaust

== Geography ==
It covers an area of 21.18 km^{2} (8 sq mi) and has a population of 523 people (2015).
