= Németh Government =

Last communist government cabinet of Hungary

- 61st Cabinet of Hungary

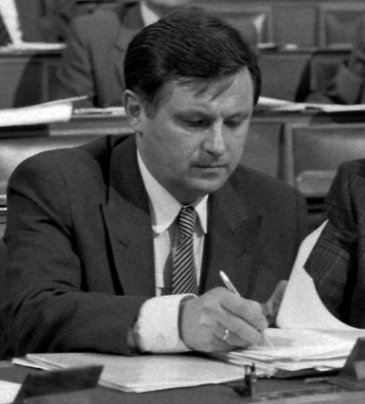
- Date formed: 24 November 1988
- Date dissolved: 23 May 1990

People and organisations
- Head of state: Brunó Ferenc Straub (MSZMP); Mátyás Szűrös (MSZMP/MSZP)
- Head of government: Miklós Németh
- Member party: MSZMP (to 1989); MSZP (from 1989)
- Status in legislature: Majority 288 / 387 (74%)

History
- Election: -
- Outgoing election: 1990 election
- Legislature term: 1985–1990
- Successor: Antall Government

The government of Miklós Németh was the last governing cabinet of Hungary before the end of Communism. It oversaw the transition to democracy, the Hungarian Round Table Talks and the declaration of the Third Hungarian Republic.

== Party breakdown ==
=== Beginning of term ===
Party breakdown of cabinet ministers at the beginning of the government term:

- MSZMP
- Independents
15
2

=== End of term ===
Party breakdown of cabinet ministers at the end of the term:

- MSZP
- Independents
15
1

== Composition ==
Office	Image	Incumbent	Political party	In office
Prime Minister		Miklós Németh	MSZMP	24 November 1988 – 23 May 1990
Deputy President of the Council of Ministers		Péter Medgyessy	MSZMP	24 November 1988 – 23 May 1990
Minister of State		Rezső Nyers	MSZMP	24 November 1988 – 27 June 1989
Minister of State		Imre Pozsgay	MSZMP	24 November 1988 – 23 May 1990
Minister of Internal Affairs		István Horváth	MSZMP	24 November 1988 – 23 January 1990
Minister of Internal Affairs		Zoltán Gál	MSZP	23 January 1990 – 23 May 1990
Minister of Foreign Affairs		Péter Várkonyi	MSZMP	24 November 1988 – 10 May 1989
Minister of Foreign Affairs		Gyula Horn	MSZMP	10 May 1989 – 23 May 1990
Minister of Finance		Miklós Villányi	MSZMP	24 November 1988 – 10 May 1989
Minister of Finance		László Békesi	MSZMP	10 May 1989 – 23 May 1990
Minister of Industry		István Horváth	MSZMP	24 November 1988 – 10 May 1989
Minister of Industry		Ferenc Horváth	MSZMP	10 May 1989 – 23 May 1990
Minister of Trade		Tamás Beck	MSZMP	24 November 1988 – 23 May 1990
Minister of Agriculture and Food		Jenő Váncsa	MSZMP	24 November 1988 – 10 May 1989
Minister of Agriculture and Food		Csaba Hütter	MSZMP	10 May 1989 – 23 May 1990
Minister of Justice		Kálmán Kulcsár	Independent	24 November 1988 – 23 January 1990
Minister of Social Affairs and Health		Judit Csehák	MSZMP	24 November 1988 – 23 January 1990
Minister of Education		Tibor Czibere	Independent	24 November 1988 – 10 May 1989
Minister of Education		Ferenc Glatz	MSZMP	10 May 1989 – 23 May 1990
Minister of Defense		Ferenc Kárpáti	MSZMP	24 November 1988 – 23 January 1990
Minister of Environment and Water Management		László Maróthy	MSZMP	24 November 1988 – 21 November 1989
Minister of Environment and Water Management		Miklós Varga	MSZMP	21 November 1989 – 23 May 1990
Minister of Construction and Urban Development (until 1 January 1989)		László Somogyi	MSZMP	24 November 1988 – 1 January 1989
Minister of Transport (until 1 January 1989)		Lajos Urbán	MSZMP	24 November 1988 – 1 January 1989
Minister of Transport, Communications and Construction (from 1 January 1989)		András Derzsi	MSZMP	1 January 1989 – 23 May 1990
President of the National Planning Office		János Hoós	MSZMP	24 November 1988 – 10 May 1989
President of the National Planning Office		Ernő Kemenes	MSZMP	10 May 1989 – 23 May 1990
