= Ferenc Miszlivetz =

Sociologist and historian

Prof. Dr. Ferenc Miszlivetz
- Born: June 10, 1954 (age 71)
- Education: MKKE (1973-1978) ELTE BTK (1976-1983)
- Spouse: Jody P. Jensen
- Children: 3

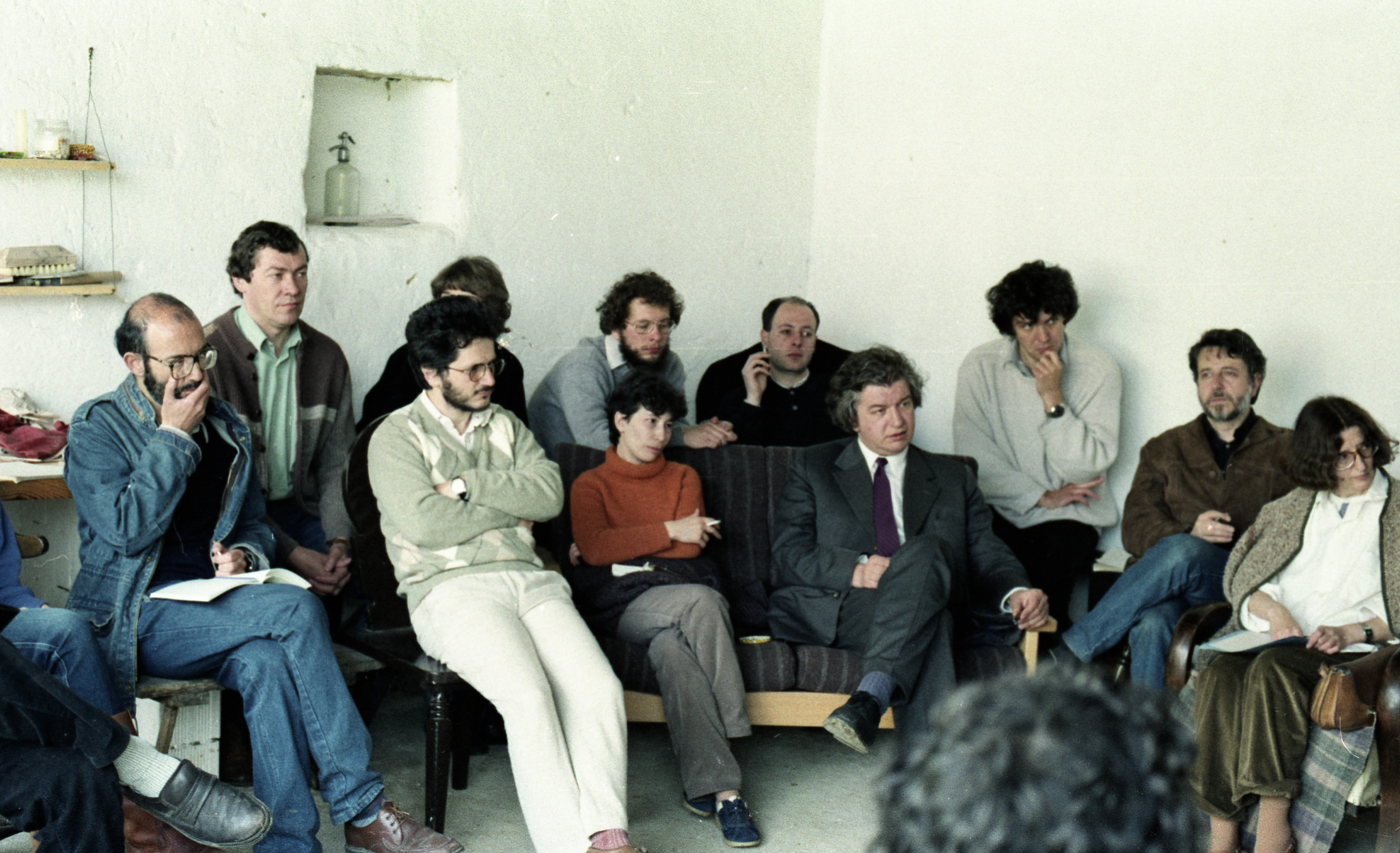
From left to right: János Kis, Iván Bába, Sándor Radnóti in a suit, Ferenc Miszlivetz in a white sweater by the wall, Ferenc Kőszeg next to him. Perőcsény, Hungary, 1987.

Ferenc Miszlivetz (born June 10, 1954) is a Hungarian academic. He is full professor at the University of Pannonia, and director of the Institute of Advanced Studies Kőszeg (iASK). His research interests include democracy, civil society, Central-European and European Studies, globalization and sustainability.

== Education and career ==
Miszlivetz graduated with an M.A. from Karl Marx University of Economics, Budapest, in 1978, and obtained a PhD in 20th Century European History from ELTE, Budapest in 1983. He studied abroad at the University of Sussex in 1983-84 and at the University of California, Berkeley and Harvard University as a Fellow of the MacArthur Foundation in 1989. He received his habilitation from Corvinus University of Budapest in 2004, and was acknowledged as Doctor of the Hungarian Academy of Sciences in International Relations in 2005.

In the early 1990s, Miszlivetz worked at the Dániel Berzsenyi Teacher Training College in Szombathely. While there, he also worked at the Sociological Research Institute of the Hungarian Academy of Sciences and served as the spokesman for the Democratic Charter. In 1993 he founded Savaria University Press. In the 2000s, he was visiting professor at Babeș-Bolyai University, University of Vienna, and Columbia University. From 2008 till 2017 he was guest lecturer at the University of Bologna (MIREES programme) and from 2009 till 2013 he held a UNESCO Chair in cultural heritage management and sustainability at ISES-Corvinus, Kőszeg. In 2010-2012 Miszlivetz was research professor at Pázmány Péter Catholic University and from 2014 full professor at the University of Pannonia in Veszprém – Kőszeg. The following year he founded the Institute of Advanced Studies, Kőszeg (IASK), which he directs since.

Since 2012 Miszlivetz has served as chair of the social sciences unit of the Hungarian UNESCO Committee and holds a UNESCO Chair in Cultural Heritage and Sustainability in Kőszeg.

Since 2026 he is an ordinary member of the European Academy of Sciences and Arts.

== Selected publications ==
- The Empire of a Golden Age: Messages from a Creative Era (co-author Izabella Agárdi). Kőszeg: Felsőbbfokú Tanulmányok Intézete, 2018. p. 107
- At the Intersections of Networks: Societal Challenges of the Fourth Industrial Revolution (co-author János Abonyi). Kőszeg: Felsőbbfokú Tanulmányok Intézete, 2018. p. 152
- Hálózatok metszéspontjain: A negyedik ipari forradalom társadalmi kihívásai. (The Intersection of Networks: The social Challenges of the Industrial Revolution 4.O) [Kőszeg-Szombathely]: Savaria University Press, 2016. p. 151
- Creative Cities and Sustainability. Szombathely: Savaria University Press, 2015., p. 236
- Reframing Europe's Future: Challenges and Failures of the European Construction (co-edited with Jody Jensen) New York: Routledge, 2015. p. 268
- Global Challenges- European and Local Answers. (co-edited with Jody Jensen) Szombathely, Savaria University Press, 2013.
- The Hungarian Work Culture in a Global Context [A magyar munkaerő kultúrája globális környezetben], Szombathely: Társadalomtudományok és Európa- tanulmányok Intézete, 2010. p. 240
- The Languages of Civil Society. Europe and Beyond, with Jody Jensen. Florence: European University Institute, 2005. Working paper.
- Central Europe ante Portas [Közép-Európa a kapuk előtt], Szombathely: Savaria University Press, 2001. p. 216
- Illusions and Realities, Szombathely: Savaria University Press: Szombathely, 1999. p. 302
- Wild East Party [Vadkelet-party], Szombathely: Savaria University Press, 1995. p. 260
- Reinventing the Boundaries of the Possible. Nationalism and Civil Society in East-Central Europe before and after 1989 [A lehetséges határainak újrafogalmazása], Budapest: Pesti Szalon, 1993. p. 230
- Frogs on the Dry Shore. Essays on New Social Movements, Arms Race and East-West Dialogue [Békák a szárazon], Budapest: Múzsák, 1989. p. 224

== Honours and awards ==
Ribbon	Name	Year	Notes
	Officer's Cross of the Hungarian Order of Merit	2021	Awarded in recognition of his decades of outstanding scientific research and teaching as well as his role in the development of the KRAFT Programme.
	Knight's Cross of the Order of Merit of the Republic of Hungary	2005	Awarded in recognition of his academic and research work in the field of civil society organisation and European integration.
