= List of ambassadors of Hungary to China =

Coordinates: 39.940729°N 116.457088°E

Ambassador of Hungary to the People's Republic of China
- Incumbent; Máté Pesti since March 23, 2018
- Inaugural holder: Emanuel Safranko
- Formation: 1950

The Hungarian ambassador in Beijing is the official representative of the Government in Budapest to the Government of China.

== List of representatives ==
Diplomatic agrément/Diplomatic accreditation	ambassador	Observations	List of heads of state of Hungary	Premier of the People's Republic of China	Term end
1950	Emanuel Safranko	In 1955 he was Ambassador to the German Democratic Republic.	István Dobi	Zhou Enlai	April 4, 1953
1954	Szobek Andras		István Dobi	Zhou Enlai	
1954	Szkaladan Agoston		István Dobi	Zhou Enlai	
May 17, 1957	Sándor Nógrádi		István Dobi	Zhou Enlai	1960
1960	Martin Ferenc		István Dobi	Zhou Enlai	
1970	Halasz Jozsef		Pál Losonczi	Zhou Enlai	
1970	Godor Ferenc		Pál Losonczi	Zhou Enlai	1976
September 3, 1976	Robert Ribanszki	was Secretary of the National Council of the Patriotic People's Front Országos Tanácsának	Pál Losonczi	Hua Guofeng	1983
September 7, 1983	Ivan Laszlo		Pál Losonczi	Hua Guofeng	1987
1988	Ivan Nemeth		Brunó Ferenc Straub	Li Peng	1988
1992	Klára Mészáros	(*1951) the first Hungarian woman ambassador.	Árpád Göncz	Li Peng	1995
1998	Otto Juhász		Árpád Göncz	Jiang Zemin	August 23, 1999
August 23, 1999	Bayer Mihaly		Árpád Göncz	Jiang Zemin	August 2, 2004
2008	Sandor Meszáros		László Sólyom	Hu Jintao	
2008	Kusai Sándor Zoltán	born at Szeghalom on November 4, 1959.	László Sólyom	Hu Jintao	
July 8, 2014	Andrea Cecília Szilas		János Áder	Li Keqiang	
March 14, 2015	Éva Szilvia Szojka	Chargé d'Affaires	János Áder	Li Keqiang	
January 19, 2018	Máté Pesti		János Áder	Li Keqiang	
