= End of communism in Hungary =

1988–1989 transition to a multi-party system

- Part of the Revolutions of 1989 and the Cold War
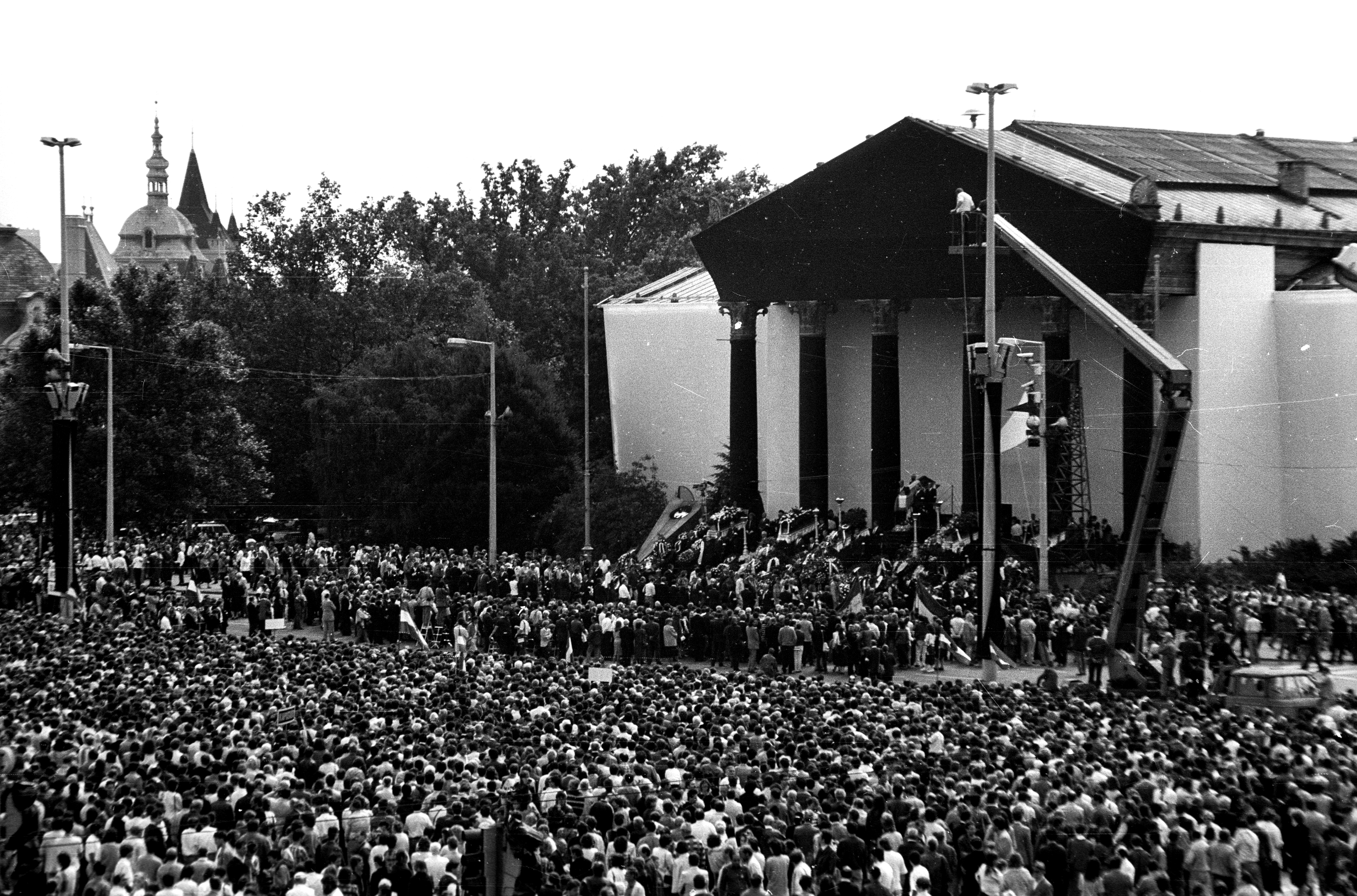
- The reburial of Imre Nagy and other prominent figures of the 1956 Hungarian Revolution on June 16, 1989, in Heroes' Square, Budapest
- Date: 22 May 1988 – 23 May 1990
- Location: Hungary
- Result: Hungarian opposition victory: End of the Communist state in Hungary; End of the Hungarian People's Republic and proclamation of the Third Hungarian Republic on 23 October 1989; Implementation of a multi-party liberal democracy; Free elections held in March–April 1990; Dismantling of the planned economy and implementation of a free market system; Rehabilitation of the memory of the 1956 Revolution

Parties
Hungarian opposition; Democratic Forum; Alliance of Free Democrats; Alliance of Young Democrats; Other dissident groups	Government of Hungarian People's Republic; Hungarian Socialist Workers' Party; Ministry of Internal Affairs III; Workers' Militia

Lead figures
József Antall; Péter Boross; Árpád Göncz; János Kis; Viktor Orbán	János Kádár # Károly Grósz; Rezső Nyers; Miklós Németh; Brunó Ferenc Straub; Mátyás Szűrös

Communist rule in the Hungarian People's Republic came to an end in 1989 by a peaceful transition from a one-party state to a multi-party and liberal-democratic system. After the Hungarian Revolution of 1956 was suppressed by Soviet forces, Hungary remained a Marxist–Leninist state. As the Soviet Union weakened at the end of the 1980s, the Eastern Bloc disintegrated.

Decades before the Hungarian Round Table Talks of 1989, political and economic forces within Hungary put pressure on the ruling Hungarian Working People's Party (MSZMP). These pressures contributed to the fall of Communism in Hungary in 1989. The events in Hungary were part of the Revolutions of 1989, known in Hungarian as the rendszerváltás (lit. 'system change').

== Prelude ==
=== Economic problems ===
The New Economic Mechanism (NEM) was the only set of economic reform in Eastern Europe enacted after the wave of 1950s and 60s revolutions that survived past 1968. Despite this, it became the weakest point of Hungarian Communism, and a pressure that contributed greatly to the transition to democracy. In 1968, the Central Committee of the MSZMP launched the NEM to alleviate Hungary's economic issues and introduced decentralization and fixed prices to offset the flaws of a centrally-planned economy. The NEM was multifaceted and multi-directional, a vigorous overhaul of the Hungarian economy. It sought to accomplish reforms in many sectors of its economy, attempting autonomous self-management of collective farms, the break-up of monopoly industries, and curtailing subsidies other than those used for exports. It also began linking prices to the world market via exchange rates, authorizing workers to produce independently in the state-owned plants after their regular hours, and substituting economic regulators for compulsory directives in the dominant state-owned sector. Finally, it legalized private artisanal, retail, and service activity.

This created a complex and extremely trade-dependent national economy, which was thus vulnerable to general fluctuations in the world market, but also to changes in prices of Soviet-imported raw materials and energy resources. Hungary, being a resource-poor satellite of the USSR, was, for its politically-independent spirit, very dependent on Soviet imports. In 1972, shortly after the NEM's introduction, the regime began restricting and limiting application of the market mechanisms that were originally implemented. This made it clear that the huge industrial combines, which had more ideological than economic value, would continue to receive the same state protection as in the past, underlining a basic weakness in the system.

By the 1980s, Hungary began to suffer from inflation, which particularly hurt people on fixed incomes. Hungary ran a massive foreign debt, and poverty became widespread. Following the institutionalization of the NEM in the 1970s, price hikes became commonplace in Hungary; however, János Kádár, the General Secretary of the MSZMP, handled them with adeptness, banking on his continuing political credibility. Kádár had proven his ability to "manage" the Kremlin, and had even stayed in power during the transition from Nikita Khrushchev to Leonid Brezhnev, remaining one of the only stable political figures in Eastern Europe. Thus, he could explain the higher prices as a down payment to the NEM, and promise good times to come without losing public approval and social order. Soon enough, the NEM "roused more widespread opposition, as many party members who had genuinely supported the strategy of reconciliation with the Soviet system could not make their peace" with the real effects of the economic system. By 1985, with political instability accompanying the economic instability, Kádár and the regime were forced to recognize the impending collapse of Communism in Hungary.

=== Attitudes toward the Warsaw Pact ===
In 1988, Hungary started making it easier for its own citizens to travel to the West, which led to the removal of Hungary's border fence with Austria in May 1989. This allowed East Germans, who were allowed only to travel to other Communist states, to go to Hungary and escape to West Germany through Austria, never again to return to East Germany. Putting foreign and Communist relations at risk, Hungary's Foreign Minister declared in September that it would not stop the thousands of East Germans fleeing to Austria. This reflected Hungary's general attitude towards the Soviet satellite setup: popular opinion was against Marxism–Leninism, and Hungarians wanted independence. With Mikhail Gorbachev's new policy of not using military action in the satellite states, and of permitting general sovereignty within the confines of each individual country, obeying popular public opinion was necessary. The imposition of order through military force was also out of the question. Imre Pozsgay told the MSZMP's general secretary that "a Hungarian soldier ordered to shoot on his own people would either shoot his commander or go home to his mother."

=== Domestic political resistance ===
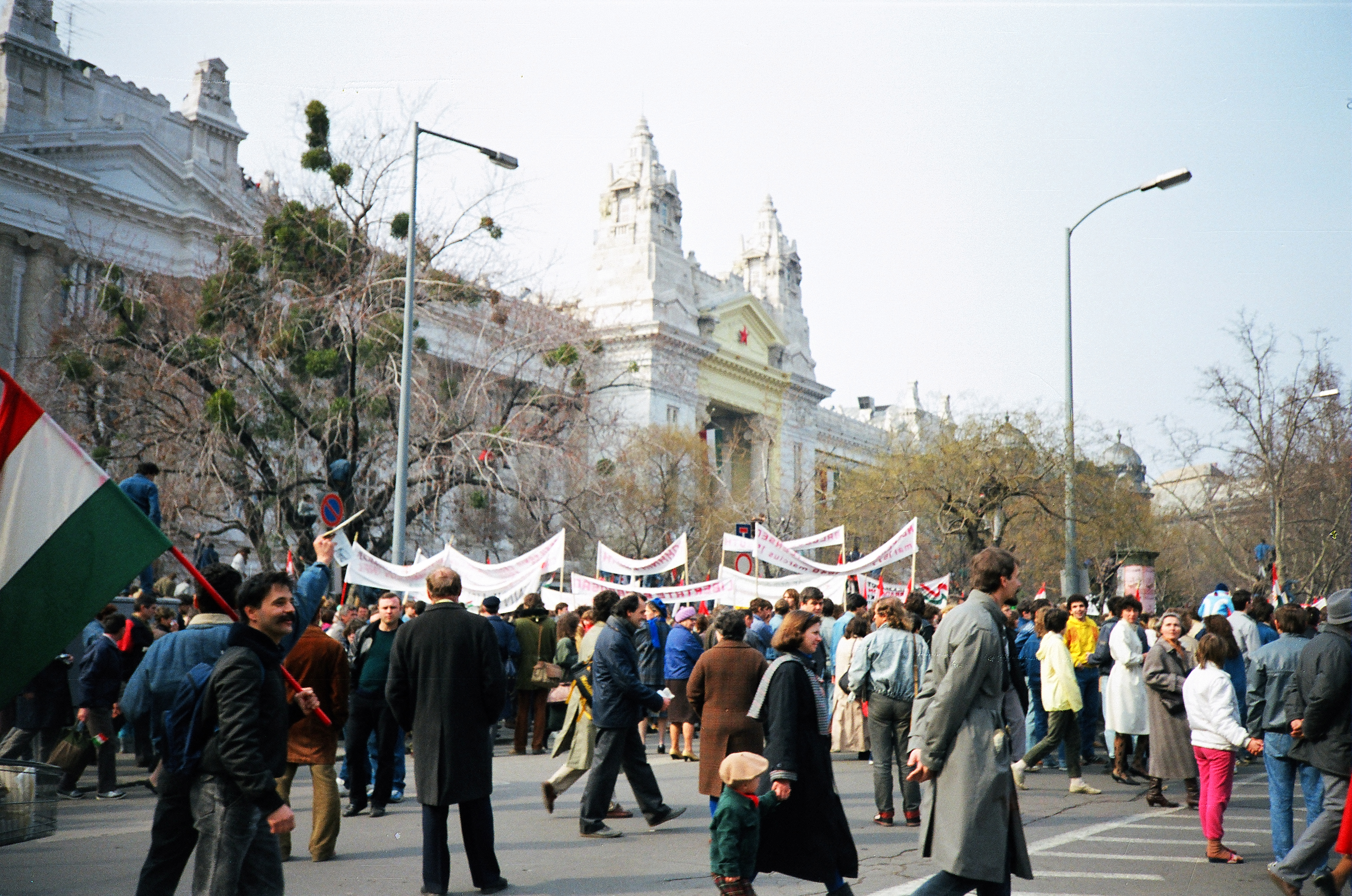
Demonstration in front of Magyar Televízió headquarters, 15 March 1989

The Hungarian Communist elite believed the economic crisis they faced could turn into social upheaval, which came on the backs of decreasing real wages, high inflation, and a mounting debt crisis. A survey from 1986 said that 61% of the Hungarian population described their position as hopeless or continually worsening. Since real wages continued to drop in the following years, there is little reason to believe that the attitudes towards the economic situation became more positive in 1989. Another survey from 1989 indicates that the Hungarians were fully aware of their relative decline. 80% of those surveyed thought Austrians had a higher standard of living, while only 13% believed that Hungarians were better off.

After 1968, an illegal group of thinkers and activists, known as the Democratic Opposition [hu], which loosely connected to the Budapest School, was formed. They were heavily observed and oppressed by the regime though later they played an important role during the changes. Hungarian elites were in agreement that the country was undergoing a severe economic crisis, which required radical reforms; however, they disagreed as to whether or not political democratization was a prerequisite for gaining public support for said reforms. Politically, the 1980s brought a wave of discontent and demands for reform. Unlike in 1956, there were many reformers from within as well as outside of the MSZMP, showing the political fragmentation of the Hungarian system. Radical reformers and many others demanded a multi-party system which was impossible to attain under a Soviet system. They did not want the Soviet system, but instead to claim the right to national self-determination. On the other hand, General Secretary Grosz was known for advocating "one-party pluralism". In December 1988, Prime Minister Miklós Németh expressed the attitude of many reformers by stating publicly that the market economy was "the only way to avoid a social catastrophe or a long, slow death". This fear that continued economic decline would lead to social upheaval is usually given as the main reason for the regime's decision to negotiate with the opposition, and a prime pressure that caused the fall of socialism in Hungary.

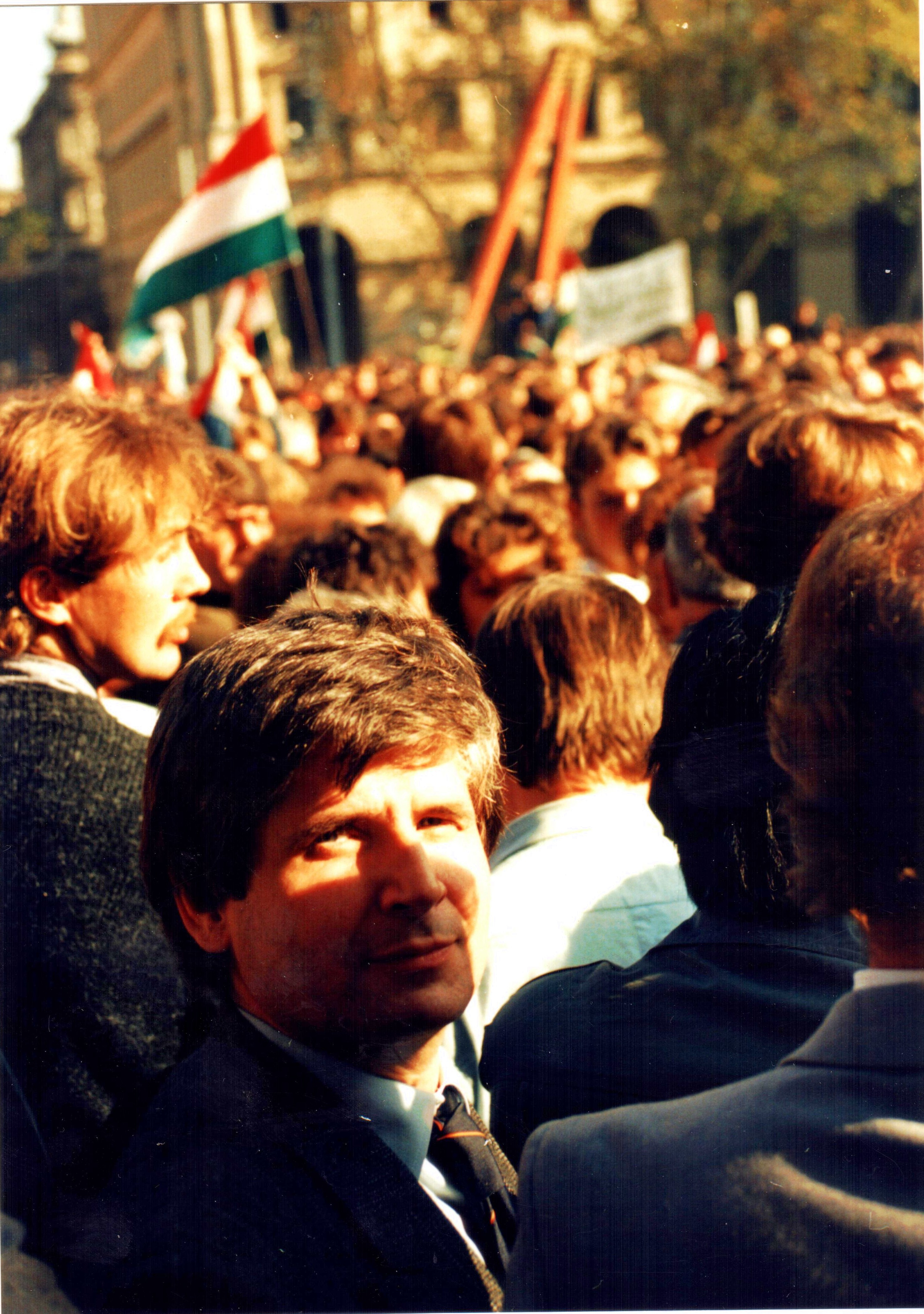
Proclamation of the Republic of Hungary

== Round table talks ==
Although Hungary had achieved some lasting economic reforms and limited political liberalization during the 1980s, major reforms only occurred following the replacement of János Kádár as General Secretary of the MSZMP on 22 May 1988. The following year, the parliament adopted a "democracy package", which included trade union pluralism; freedom of association, assembly, and the press; a new electoral law; and a radical revision of the constitution, among others. Imre Nagy, whom Communists had executed decades ago, was politically rehabilitated and his remains reburied on the 31st anniversary of his execution in the same plot after a funeral organized by, among others, opponents of the country's Communist regime. Over 100,000 people are estimated to have attended Nagy's reinterment. The Pan-European Picnic was a peace demonstration held on the Austrian–Hungarian border near the town of Sopron on 19 August 1989, an important event in political developments which led to the fall of the Iron Curtain and the reunification of Germany.

In October 1989, the MSZMP convened its last congress and re-established itself as the Hungarian Socialist Party (MSZP). In a historic session from 16 October to 20 October, the parliament adopted a package of nearly 100 constitutional amendments providing for multi-party parliamentary elections and a direct presidential election. The legislation transformed Hungary from a People's Republic into the Republic of Hungary, guaranteed human and civil rights, and created an institutional structure that ensured separation of powers among the judicial, legislative, and executive branches of government. On 23 October 1989, at Kossuth tér, Budapest, the Republic of Hungary was proclaimed by Mátyás Szűrös, the provisional president of Hungary, from a balcony of the Hungarian Parliament Building.

== First free elections ==
The first free parliamentary election, held in May 1990, was a plebiscite of sorts on the Communist past. The revitalized and reformed socialists under the MSZP performed poorly despite having more than the usual advantages of an incumbent party. Populist, centre-right, and liberal parties fared best, with the Hungarian Democratic Forum (MDF) winning 43% of the vote and the Alliance of Free Democrats (SZDSZ) capturing 24%. Under Prime Minister József Antall, the MDF formed a centre-right coalition government with the Independent Smallholders, Agrarian Workers and Civic Party (FKGP) and the Christian Democratic People's Party (KDNP) to command a 60% majority in the newly-established parliament, the National Assembly. Parliamentary opposition parties included the SZDSZ, the MSZP, and the Alliance of Young Democrats (FIDESZ).

== End of the Soviet occupation ==
Between 12 March 1990 and 19 June 1991, the Soviet troops (known as the Southern Group of Forces) left Hungary. The last units commanded by General Viktor Silov crossed the Hungarian–Ukrainian border at Záhony. The total number of Soviet military and civilian personnel stationed in Hungary was around 100,000. The withdrawal was performed with 35,000 railway cars. Since 2001, by a special bill passed in the National Assembly, 16 June was declared a national memorial day.

== Aftermath ==
On 16 March 1999, Hungary joined NATO. On 1 May 2004, along with the other Visegrad countries, it also joined the European Union, strengthening its ties with Western European countries and the United States. In April 2011, a new constitution (known as the Fundamental Law of Hungary) was adopted as part of the Orbán era, and officially came into force on 1 January 2012.
