= Péter Tölgyessy =

Hungarian politician (born 1957)

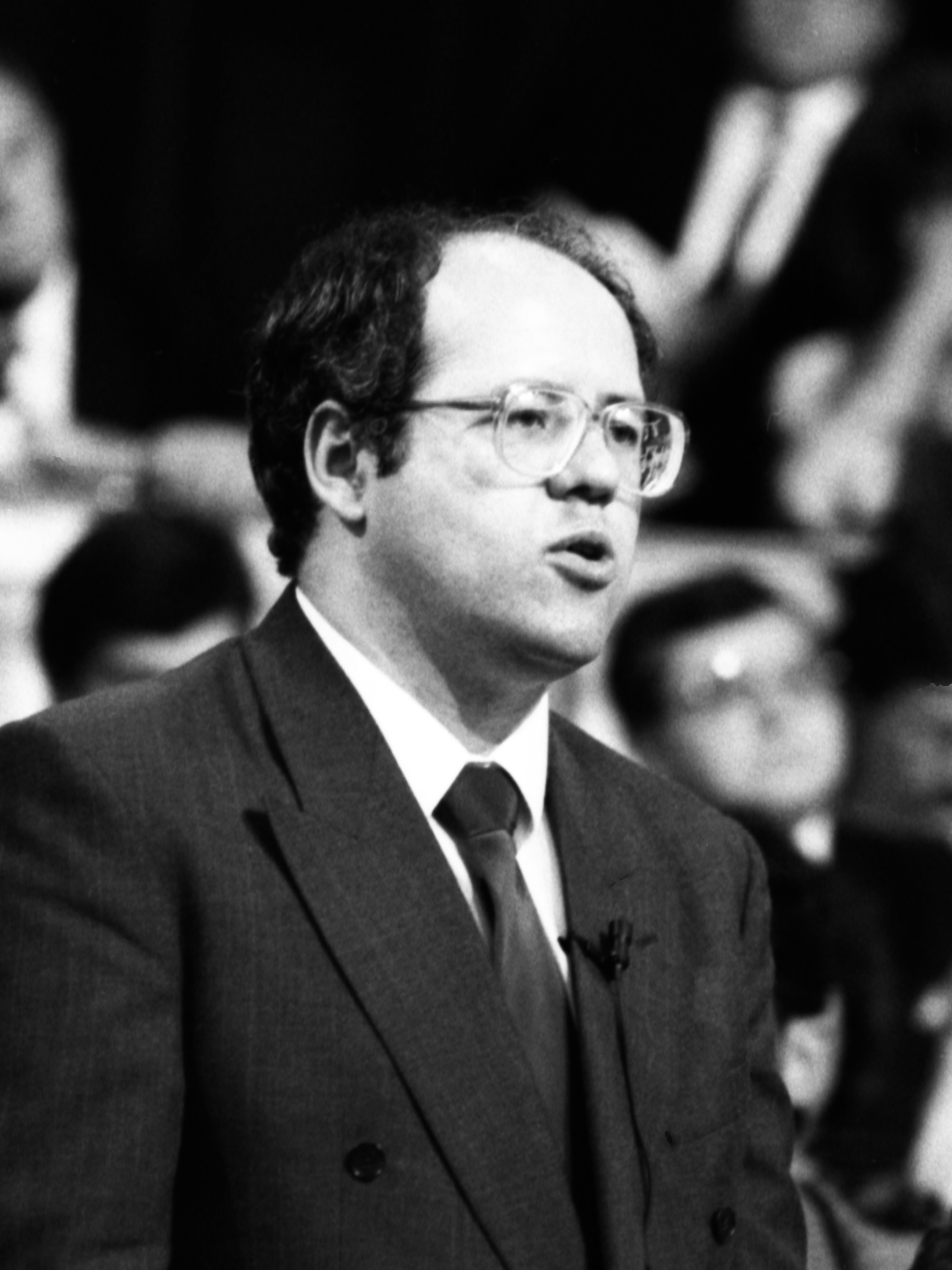
- Tölgyessy in 1990

President of the Alliance of Free Democrats
- In office 23 November 1991 – 13 November 1992
- Preceded by: János Kis
- Succeeded by: Iván Pető

Faction leader of the Alliance of Free Democrats
- In office 2 May 1990 – 15 October 1990
- President: János Kis
- Preceded by: Position established
- Succeeded by: Iván Pető

Member of the National Assembly
- In office 2 May 1990 – 15 May 2006
- Constituency: Komárom-Esztergom County (1990–1994); Nationwide (1994–2006)

Personal details
- Born: 15 September 1957 (age 69) Esztergom, Hungary
- Party: SZDSZ (1988–1996); Independent (1996–1998); Fidesz (1998–2006)
- Spouse: Magdolna Sass
- Education: Eötvös Loránd University
- Occupation: Lawyer; political scientist; politician

Péter Tölgyessy (Note: Hungarian: Tölgyessy Péter; Hungarian pronunciation: [ˈpeːtɛr ˈtølɟɛʃːi]) (born 15 September 1957) is a Hungarian lawyer, political scientist, and politician. In the time of the political transition in 1989, he was one of the representatives of the Alliance of Free Democrats in the Opposition and the National Round Table Talks. He was the president of SZDSZ between 1991 and 1992, the party's first fraction leader and the Leader of the Opposition between 1990 and January 1991. He was a member of the National Assembly between 1990 and 2006.

During the Orbán era he was one of the most significant political thinkers in the independent public sphere in Hungary.

== Early life ==
Tölgyessy was born on 15 September 1957 in Esztergom.

He attended the Sándor Petőfi Elementary School in Esztergom and graduated from the József Károly Hell Vocational High School in 1975. After completing his military service, he began his university studies at the Faculty of Law and Political Sciences at Eötvös Loránd University, where he earned his doctorate in law in 1981. After graduating, he was hired as a research fellow at the Institute of Law and Political Sciences of the Hungarian Academy of Sciences. His research was focused on interest groups and public law.

== Career ==
In 1987, he contributed to the compilation of the collected essays titled Turning Point and Reform. Subsequently, he participated in drafting the platform of the newly formed Alliance of Free Democrats, serving as the author or co-author of the sections on constitutional law and political transition. In 1989, he joined the party and was an active participant in various roundtable negotiations. In these, he served as the head of the subcommittee on constitutional matters and electorial law. At his initiative, the mixed electorial system (i.e., one combining list-based and individual elements) was introduced. Since his party and Fidesz did not sign the final document of the national roundtable talks, he was one of the initiators of the signature drive aimed at calling the so called "four-yes" referendum. He served as the party's acting chairman between 1989 and 1990, as well as between 1992 and 1994. He also served on the National Council starting in 1989. In 1991, he was elected as president of SZDSZ, a position held until 1992; during his one-year presidency, conflicts between the various factions within the party intensified, and at the 1992 party convention, Iván Pető was elected party president. In 1996, he left the party due to the policies of the Horn Government.

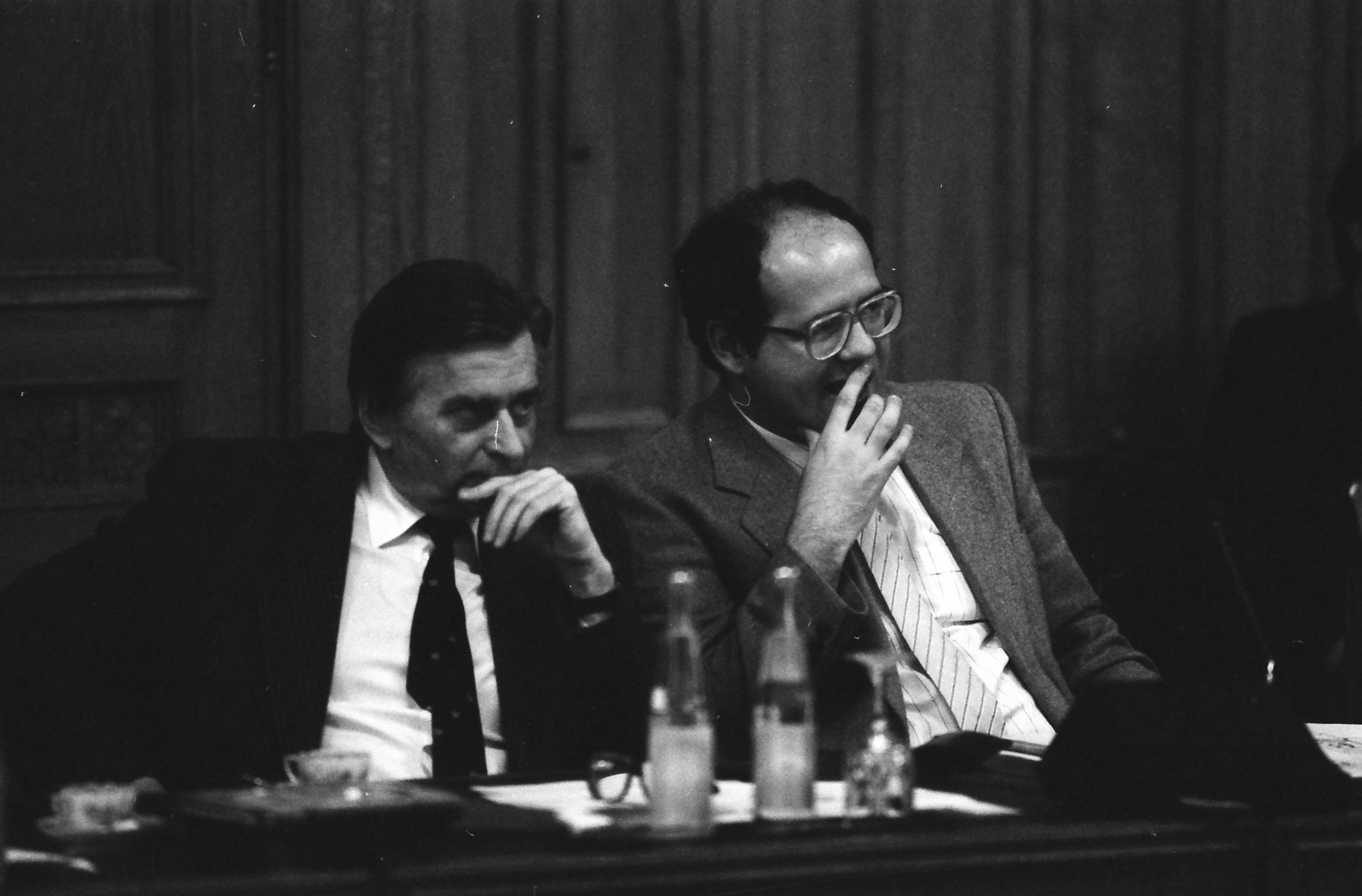
Prime minister József Antall and SZDSZ leader Péter Tölgyessy in the National Assembly.

In the 1990 parliamentary elections following the change of regime, he was elected to the National Assembly from his party's list for Komárom-Esztergom County. He was subsequently elected as the parliamentary group leader. He held his position until October 1990, when he was replaced by Iván Pető. He was a member of the Rules of Procedure Committee, as well as the Constitutional, Legislative, and Judicial Affairs Committee (the latter until 1992). In the 1994 parliamentary elections, he won a seat in the National Assembly from SZDSZ's national list. He was a member of the Audit Committee. After leaving his party, he continued his work as an independent representative; at the time, due to the Rules of Procedure in effect at the time, he also had to relinquish his committee seat. In the 1998 and 2002 parliamentary elections, he won a seat on the Fidesz national list (he was not a member of the party). He served as a member of the Audit Committee. He did not run in the 2006 parliamentary elections, at which point he retired from active politics. His parliamentary career became notable, among other things, for the fact that he never once spoke in the National Assembly since 1993; instead, he expressed his views on public affairs in opinion pieces and interviews.

Following his political career, he became a research fellow at the Institute of Political Science of the Hungarian Academy of Sciences in 2007. There, he is a researcher in the Department of Democracy and Political Theory. His research focuses on the crisis of the Hungarian model and the challenges facing the restored constitutional order since the transition to democracy. In addition, he is a visiting lecturer at the Institute of Political Science at the Faculty of Law and Political Sciences of Eötvös Loránd University. For several years, he also hosted a program on Magyar Rádió as part of Kossuth Rádió's 180 Minutes. His program ended in 2010. In 2009, he was awarded the Grand Cross of the Order Merit of the Republic of Hungary in recognition of his activities during the transition to democracy.

== Major publications ==
- Business Interest Groups in Hungary
  (Gazdasági érdekképviseletek Magyarországon); MSZMP KB TTI, Bp., 1988 (Műhelytanulmányok MSZMP KB Társadalomtudományi Intézete)
- A Balance of Discontent: Selected Writings
  (Elégedetlenségek egyensúlya. Válogatott írások; Helikon, Bp., 1999 (Helikon universitas. Politológia)
- Overburdened Democracy: Our Constitutional and Governmental Framework
  (Túlterhelt demokrácia: alkotmányos és kormányzati alapszerkezetünk) (co-author, 2006)
- The Intellectuals and the Transition to Democracy
  (Értelmiség és a rendszerváltás) (2008)
- Restitution of constitutionalism in Hungary (2009)
- Commentary on the Constitution, Volumes I–II
  (Az Alkotmány kommentárja I-II.) (co-author, 2010)
- Fidesz and a Possible New Direction for Hungarian Politics
  (A Fidesz és a magyar politika lehetséges új iránya) (2012)
- The Fundamental Law Under Scrutiny: A Collection of Interviews on Hungary’s New Constitution. László Sólyom, László Trócsányi, András Jakab, Csaba Tordai, István Kukorelli, Herbert Küpper, András Patyi, Péter Tölgyessy
  (Mérlegen az alaptörvény. Interjúkötet hazánk új alkotmányáról. Sólyom László, Trócsányi László, Jakab András, Tordai Csaba, Kukorelli István, Herbert Küpper, Patyi András, Tölgyessy Péter;); szerk. Molnár Benedek, Németh Márton, Tóth Péter; HVG ORAC–Stádium Intézet, Bp., 2013
- Nature of the Orbán Regime, Volumes I–V
  (Az Orbán-rendszer természete I-V.) (2013)
- A sense of immovability forged in times of crisis
  (Válság idején teremtett mozdíthatatlanság) (2014)

== Awards ==
- Grand Cross of the Order of Merit of the Republic of Hungary (2009)
