= End of Communism =

End of Communism in 1989 may refer to:

- Revolutions of 1989
- End of Communism in Bulgaria (1989)
- End of Communism in Hungary (1989)
- End of Communism in Poland (1989)
- Fall of the Berlin Wall
- Romanian Revolution
- Velvet Revolution
