= Gergely Berzeviczy =

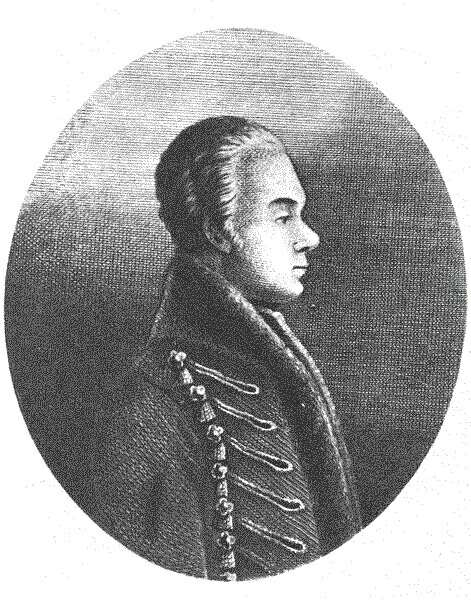
- Born: 15 June 1763; Veľká Lomnica, Kingdom of Hungary
- Died: 23 February 1822 (aged 58); Veľká Lomnica, Kingdom of Hungary, Austrian Empire
- Occupations: Political economist and writer
- Notable work: De conditione et indole rusticorum in Hungaria (1806); Notizen über das Zipser Komitat in Ungarn (1810)

Gergely Berzeviczy berzeviczei és kakaslomniczi (Hungarian: Berzeviczy Gergely, Slovak: Gregor Berzevici or Gregor Berzeviczy, German: Gregor Berzeviczy; 15 June 1763 – 23 February 1822) was a Slovak political economist and writer. He was a follower of Adam Smith and one of the first political economists in the Kingdom of Hungary. He wrote enthusiastically about the High Tatras. He is renowned both in Hungary and Slovakia.

== Life ==
He was born on 15 June 1763 in Kakaslomnic in the Kingdom of Hungary (now Veľká Lomnica, Slovakia). He graduated from the Lyceum of Kežmarok (Késmárk) as a lawyer in 1783, then he continued his studies until 1786 at the University of Göttingen. Berzeviczy travelled modern-day Germany, France, Belgium and England, before returning to Hungary. After returning, he became as a state clerk, which involved a lot of travel within the country. During his inland travel experiences, Berzeviczy wrote many reform ideas to the king, Joseph II about boosting the economy of Hungary, but they were not accepted. In 1795, Berzeviczy took a minor part in the jacobinist Martinovics Plot against the new emperor Francis I, named after its leader, Ignác Martinovics. After its failure, Berzeviczy retired from active work and turned to science, especially to economics and ethnography, and writing. He was one of the first economists in Hungary to realize that feudalism was blocking the country's economic advancement greatly. He also criticized the exploitation of the peasants by the nobles, using a very sharp tone.

De commercio et industria Hungariae was the first book in Hungary to contain the elements of Adam Smith's theories. In his book De conditione et indole rusticorum in Hungaria Berzeviczy compared the peasants of Europe by countries, being the first one to do it in Hungary. Berzeviczy's research and publications in ethnography and economics earned him a place in the Company of Scholars in Göttingen in 1802.

He wrote his works in Latin and German only.

== Important works ==
- De commercio et industria Hungariae (Lőcse, 1797)
- De conditione et indole rusticorum in Hungaria (Lőcse, 1806)
- Notizen über das Zipser Komitat in Ungarn Vaterländer Blätter (1810)
- Oeconomica Publico Politica etc. (1818, first printed in Budapest in 1902)
- Die Karpathen in Ungern, ihre natürliche Beschaffenheit, ihre naturerscheinungen, ihre Seen un Thäler, Thiere, Pflanzen und Mineralien, in Franz Sartori: Oesterreichs Tibur (Vienna, 1819)
- Die merkwürdigen Karpathen in Ungarn in Franz Sartori: Naturwunder und ausserordenliche Naturerscheinungen unserer Zeit in dem österr. Kaiserthum (Graz, 1821)

== Memorials ==
The Berzeviczy Gergely School of Trade and Catering in Miskolc, Hungary was named after him.
