= Károly Németh (politician) =

Hungarian politician (1922–2008)

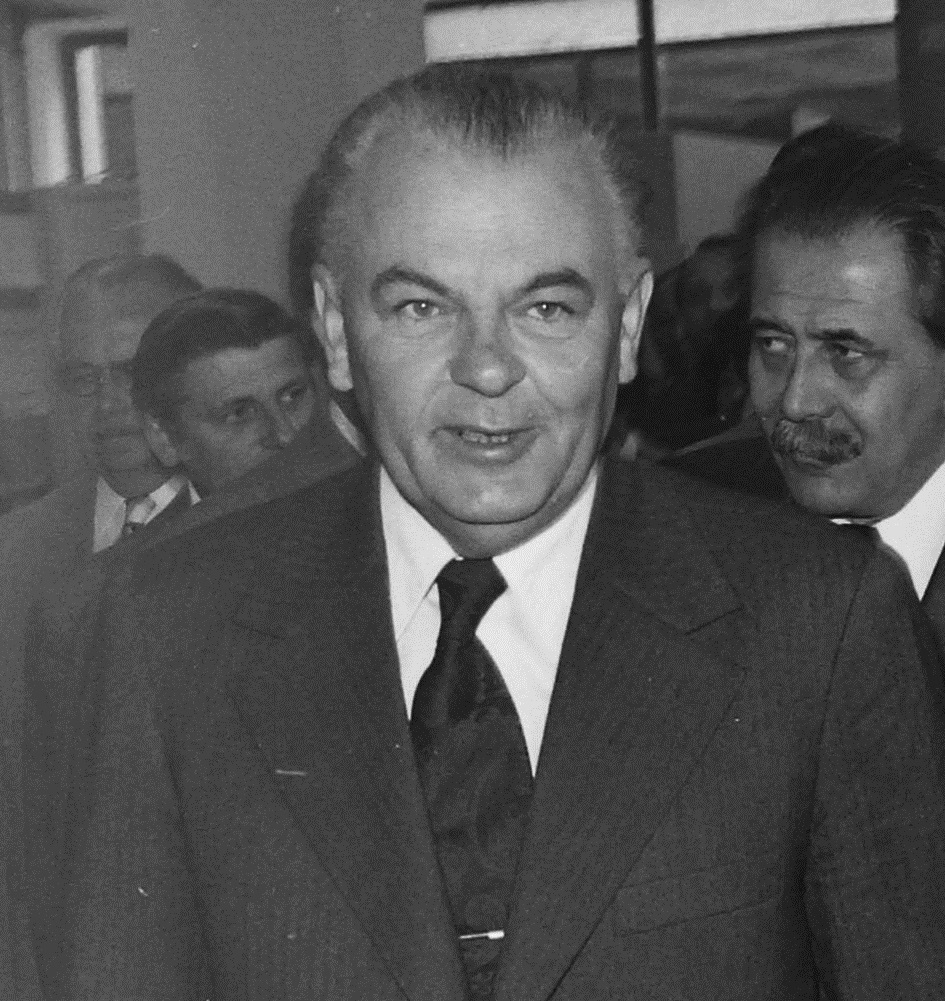

Chairman of the Presidential Council of the People's Republic of Hungary
- In office 25 June 1987 – 29 June 1988
- Chairman of the Council of Ministers: Károly Grósz
- Preceded by: Pál Losonczi
- Succeeded by: Brunó Ferenc Straub

Personal details
- Born: 14 December 1922 Páka, Kingdom of Hungary
- Died: 12 March 2008 (aged 85) Budapest, Hungary
- Party: Hungarian Socialist Workers' Party

Károly Németh (14 December 1922 – 12 March 2008) was a Hungarian political figure born in Páka. He served as the chairman of the Hungarian Presidential Council from 25 June 1987 to 29 June 1988.

== Biography ==
He began his working life as a butcher in the food industry. He had been a member of the Hungarian Communist Party since 1945. After graduating from the Higher Party School, from 1954 — secretary, first secretary of the party cell in the Chongrad media center (until 1959). From 1957 — member of the Central Committee of the Hungarian Socialist Workers' Party (HSWP), in 1960–1965 — head of the agricultural department of the HSWP Central Committee, from 1966 — a candidate, and from November 1970 – 1989 — a member of the Politburo of the HSWP Central Committee. In 1962–1965 and from March 1974 – 1985 — secretary of the HSWP Central Committee.

In June 1965 – 1974 he was also the first secretary of the Budapest City Committee of the HSWP. For 30 years, from 1958 to 1988 — a deputy of the Hungarian parliament, he was a member of the Presidium of the National Assembly of Hungary.

On 28 March 1985, in the context of a complicated economic situation, he was made Deputy General Secretary of the HSWP Central Committee under János Kádár, as a supporter of the liberalization of the political course. On 25 June 1987, he replaced Pál Losonczi in the position of Chairman of the Presidium of the National Assembly of Hungary, but he held this position for just over a year, and on 29 June 1988, he left his post.

Political offices
| Preceded by Pál Losonczi | Chairman of the Hungarian Presidential Council; 1987–1988 | Succeeded by Brunó Ferenc Straub |
