= Veľká Lomnica =

- Municipality
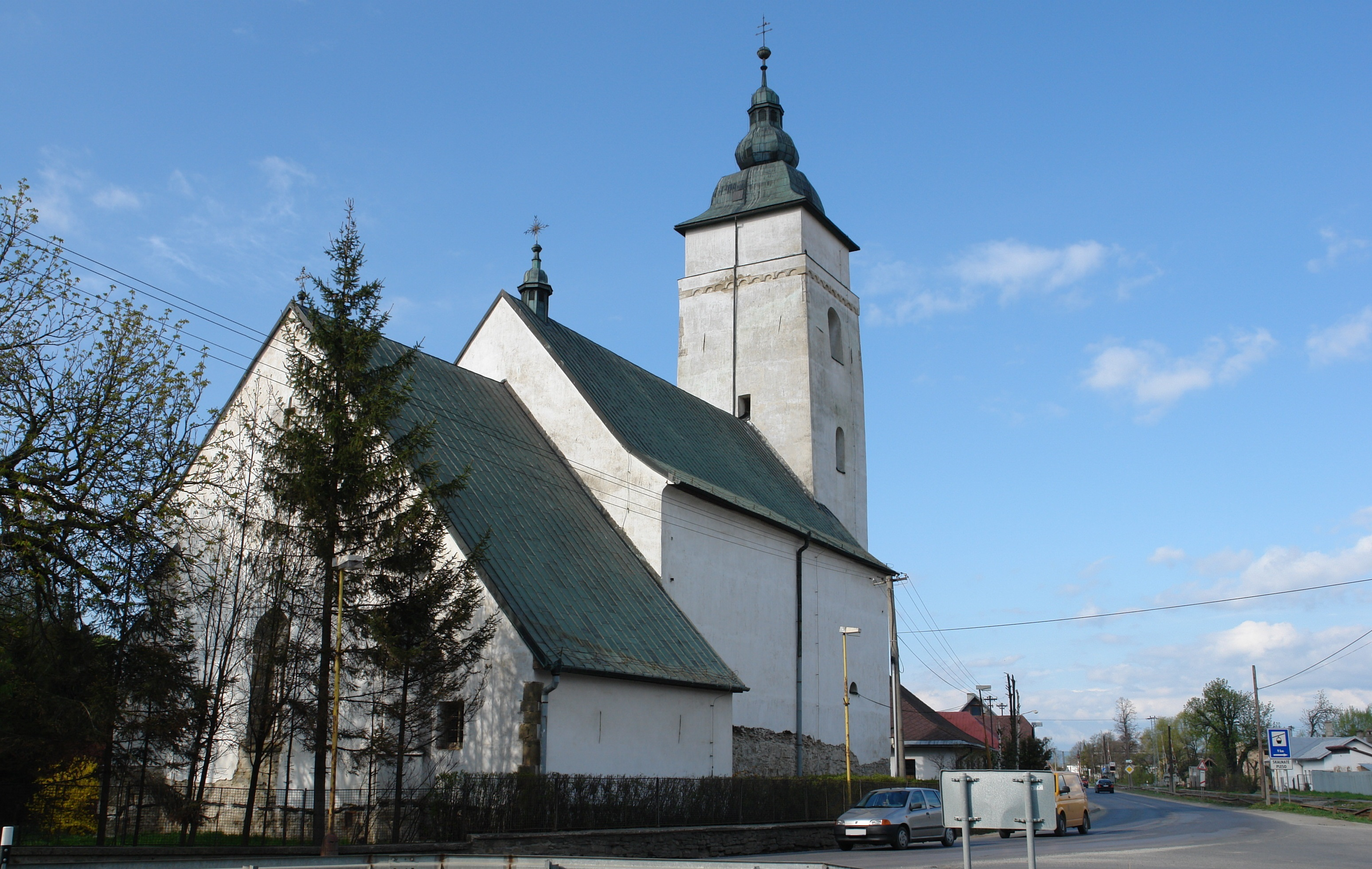

- Flag

- Location of Veľká Lomnica in the Prešov Region Location of Veľká Lomnica in Slovakia
- Coordinates: 49.12°N 20.35°E
- Country: Slovakia
- Region: Prešov Region
- District: Kežmarok District
- First mentioned: 1257

Area
  - Total: 19.11 km^{2} (7.38 sq mi)
- Elevation: 647 m (2,123 ft)

Population (2025)
  - Total: 5,612
- Time zone: UTC+1 (CET)
  - Summer (DST): UTC+2 (CEST)
- Postal code: 595 2
- Area code: +421 52
- Vehicle registration plate (until 2022): KK
- Website: www.velkalomnica.sk

Veľká Lomnica (Hungarian: Kakaslomnic, German: Großlomnitz, Rusyn: Велька Ломнїца) is a large village and municipality in Kežmarok District in the Prešov Region of north Slovakia.

== Geography ==
The municipality lies at an altitude of 647 metres (2,123 ft) and covers an area of 19.11 km^{2} (7.38 sq mi) (2025).

== Etymology ==
Lomnica is thought to stem from Slav word Lom - (rock) quarry, the name Veľká (great) has been added in later records to differentiate it from two other settlements with the same name.

== History ==
Archaeological finds of fortified settlement of Baden culture in the locality Burchbrich are dated to the end of stone and beginning of Bronze Age, more than 4000 years ago. 70 small animal sculptures were found as well as many tools. In the first century BC, the Celts settle here and during Great Moravia period the Slavs arrive. The village was first mentioned in 1257. The original Slav population was outnumbered by German settlers in the Middle Ages. Before the establishment of independent Czechoslovakia in 1918, Veľká Lomnica was part of Szepes County within the Kingdom of Hungary. From 1939 to 1945, it was part of the Slovak Republic. On 28 January 1945, the Red Army dislodged the Wehrmacht from Veľká Lomnica in the course of the Western Carpathian offensive and it was once again part of Czechoslovakia. In the upheavals of 1945 the Germans were expelled and now the population is formed by Slovak settlers mainly from Pohorela and region of Gorals and also by Roma ethnic group. The well preserved romano-gothic church of Catherine of Alexandria was built in the 13th century and rebuilt in the 15th century. It has unique gothic wall frescoes discovered in the 1950s. The fresco "King Ladislaus fighting the Cumans" is considered one of the most valuable in Slovakia.

== Population ==
Population statistic (10 years)
Year	1995	2005	2015	2025
Count	3324	3799	4609	5612
Difference		+14.29%	+21.32%	+21.76%

Population statistic
Year	2024	2025
Count	5529	5612
Difference		+1.50%

It has a population of 5612 people (31 December 2025).

=== Ethnicity ===
Census 2021 (1+%)
Ethnicity	Number	Fraction
Slovak	4471	87.32%
Romani	1002	19.57%
Not found out	298	5.82%
Total	5120	

In year 2021 was 5120 people by ethnicity 4471 as Slovak, 1002 as Romani, 298 as Not found out, 23 as Czech, 21 as Other, 10 as Rusyn, 9 as Hungarian, 8 as Polish, 7 as German, 5 as Ukrainian, 2 as Italian, 2 as English, 1 as Russian and 1 as Canadian.

Note on population: The difference values of population numbers in the table "Population statistic" and in the sections "Ethnicity" & "Religion" is caused by the use of various statistical methods.

A significant portion of the municipality's population consists of the local Roma community. In 2019, they constituted an estimated 50% of the local population.

=== Religion ===
Census 2021 (1+%)
Religion	Number	Fraction
Roman Catholic Church	4014	78.4%
None	594	11.6%
Not found out	241	4.71%
Evangelical Church	120	2.34%
Total	5120	

In year 2021 was 5120 people by religion 4014 from Roman Catholic Church, 594 from None, 241 from Not found out, 120 from Evangelical Church, 45 from Other and not ascertained christian church, 45 from Greek Catholic Church, 14 from Eastern Orthodox Church, 10 from Jehovah's Witnesses, 6 from Christian Congregations in Slovakia, 5 from Ad hoc movements, 4 from Calvinist Church, 4 from Other, 4 from Buddhism, 3 from United Methodist Church, 3 from Seventh-day Adventist Church, 3 from Apostolic Church, 2 from Paganism and natural spirituality, 2 from Baptists Church and 1 from Old Catholic Church.

== Golf course ==
In 2005 had been opened a nine holes golf course and a year later additional nine holes course circuit, so in 2012 has Veľká Lomnica altogether 18 holes course. Before opening is another nine holes circuit. The village is a place of annual golf tournament Charity Golf Cup.

== Notable people ==
- Gergely Berzeviczy (1763–1822), economist
- Adolf Burger (1917–2016), Slovak Jewish typographer, memoir writer and Holocaust survivor
