= Institute of Advanced Studies Kőszeg =

Research institute

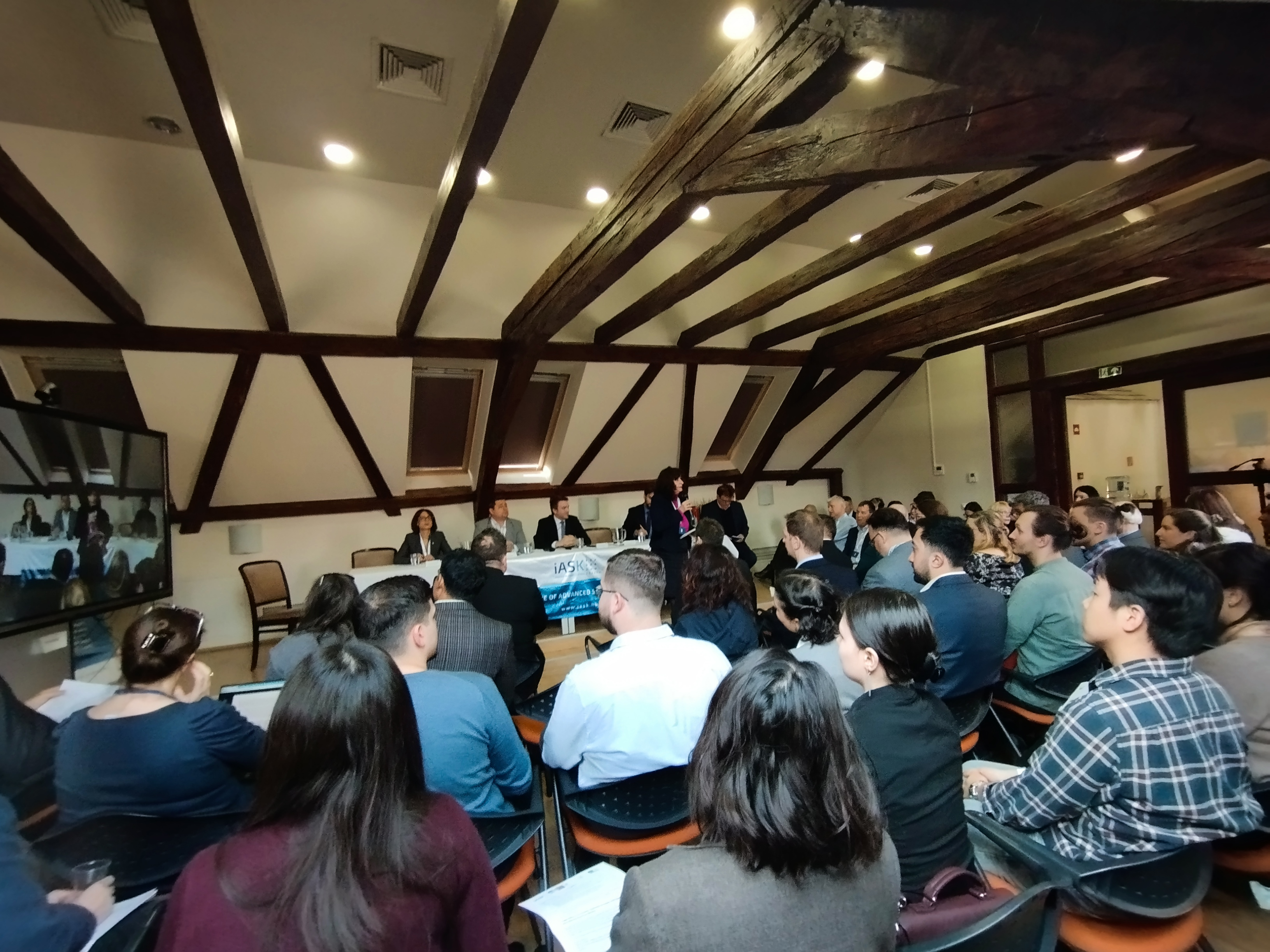
- 2025 iASK UNESCO Winter School
- Established: 2015; 11 years ago
- Location: Kőszeg, Hungary
- Campus: Urban
- Website: iask.hu/en/

The Institute for Advanced Studies Kőszeg (iASK; Hungarian: Felsőbbfokú Tanulmányok Intézete, FTI), is a research institute located in Kőszeg, a city on the border between Hungary and Austria. It was established in 2015.

== Overview ==
The Institute for Advanced Studies Kőszeg covers environmental science, regional development, complexity studies, regional studies, and digital society research. It closely cooperates with the University of Pannonia in Kőszeg. The institute offers research fellowships lasting 3–5 months across research areas.
