= Imre Dimény =

Hungarian politician (1922–2017)

Minister of Agriculture and Food
- In office 14 April 1967 – 4 July 1975
- Prime Minister: Jenő Fock; György Lázár
- Preceded by: Pál Losonczi (Minister of Agriculture)
- Succeeded by: Pál Romány

Personal details
- Born: 3 August 1922 Comolău, Romania
- Died: 15 March 2017 (aged 94) Budapest, Hungary
- Party: MSZMP
- Profession: politician

Imre Dimény (3 August 1922 – 15 March 2017) was a Hungarian agrarian engineer and Communist politician, who served as Minister of Agriculture and Food between 1967 and 1975. He was a member of the Hungarian Academy of Sciences.

== Works ==
- A gépesítés ökonómiája a mezőgazdaságban, Akadémiai Kiadó 1971, 236 p.
- Mezőgazdaságunk és a műszaki fejlesztés, Kossuth Könyvkiadó,1973, 183 p.
- Az állattartás gépesítésének ökonómiája, Akadémiai Kiadó, 1973,249 p.
- A gépesítésfejlesztés ökonómiája a mezőgazdaságban, Akadémiai Kiadó, 1975, 507 p.
- A gépesítésfejlesztés a kertészeti ágazatokban, Akadémiai Kiadó,1981, 227 p.
- A kertgazdaság vállalati alapjai, Mezőgazdasági Kiadó, 1983, 262 p.
- A kertgazdaság ökonómiai alapjai, Akadémiai Kiadó, 1989, 565 p.
- Élelmiszergazdasági erőforrások hatékonyságának javítása, Akadémiai Kiadó, 1992, 197 p.
- A vertikális kapcsolatok fejlesztésének összefüggései. In: Gazdálkodás, 1994, 5. 21-27 p.(társszerző: Rédai István)
- Agrárpolitikai megfontolások és a műszaki fejlesztés, Debreceni Agrártudományi Egyetem Tiszántúli Mezőgazdasági Tudományos Napok Ökonómiai Szekció, Debrecen 1999, 3-10. p.
- (Társsz.: Kovács Ferenc– Szűcs István): A mezőgazdaság szerepe a halmozottan hátrányos helyzetű térségek fejlesztésénél, MTA Agrártudományok Osztálya, Budapest, 1999. 245. p.
- (Társsz.: Széles Gyula – Szűcs István): Korszakváltások és kihívások az agrár-közgazdasági tudományokban, MTA Agrártudományok Osztályának 2001. évi Tájékoztatója, Budapest, 2001. 73–82. p.
- Kozma Pál a szőlészet tudós professzora. In: Csoma Zsigmond-Balogh István Milleneumi Szőlő-boros könyv, Agroinform, Budapest, 2000. 592–599. p.
- Zárszó helyett, a hazai agrárpolitika tanulságai és lehetőségei, FM-MTA Agrártudományok Osztálya, Budapest, 1998. 116–122. p.
- A mezőgazdaság sikeressége a 60-as, 70-es években. In: Nagy János – Kovács János „Személyiségek a magyar agráriumban” 79-105. p. Debrecen 2005.

== Sources ==
- Jávor András: A Debreceni Egyetem Agrártudományi Centrum Díszdoktorai, Debrecen 2002. Debreceni Egyetem Agrár- és Műszaki Tudományok Centruma
- Székely Hírmondó
- Budapesti Corvinus Egyetem Élelmiszertudományi Kar Élelmiszeripari Gazdaságtan Tanszék
- Z. Kiss László: Dimény Imre köszöntése 85. születésnapján In: Kertgazdaság, 2008. 40. évf. 1.

Political offices
Preceded by Pál Losonczi	Minister of Agriculture and Food; 1967–1975	Succeeded by Pál Romány
