= Sándor Dominich =

Sándor Dominich (July 12, 1954 – August 13, 2008) was the George Pólya Professor of Computer Science, and the founding leader of the Centre for Information Retrieval, Faculty of Information Technology, University of Pannonia, Veszprém, Hungary.

Born in Aiud, Romania, Dominich proposed the Interaction Information Retrieval (I2R) model based on the Copenhagen Interpretation of Quantum Mechanics using Artificial Neural Networks. The I2R model was implemented in the I2RMeta Web meta-search engine, in the NeuRadIR medical image intranet search engine, and in the (i2r)Application intranet search engines.

He died at the age of 54 in Sopron in 2008.

Dominich is the author of the books "Mathematical Foundations of Information Retrieval", Kluwer Academic Publishers, (now Springer Verlag), 2001, and "The Modern Algebra of Information Retrieval", Springer Verlag, 2008.
