= Pál Romány =

Hungarian agrarian engineer and politician (1929–2019)

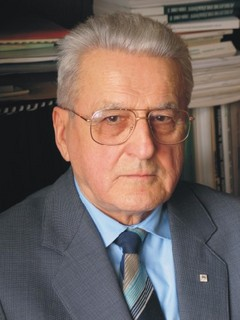

Minister of Agriculture and Food
- In office 4 July 1975 – 27 June 1980
- Prime Minister: György Lázár
- Preceded by: Imre Dimény
- Succeeded by: Jenő Váncsa

Personal details
- Born: 17 November 1929 Szajol, Hungary
- Died: 16 December 2019 (aged 90) Budapest, Hungary
- Party: MSZMP
- Profession: politician

Pál Romány (17 November 1929 – 16 December 2019) was a Hungarian agrarian engineer and former Communist politician, who served as Minister of Agriculture and Food between 1975 and 1980. He was the last Rector of Hungarian MSZMPs Political School in 1988–89.

== Sources ==
- Bölöny, József – Hubai, László: Magyarország kormányai 1848–2004 [Cabinets of Hungary 1848–2004], Akadémiai Kiadó, Budapest, 2004 (5th edition).

Political offices
Preceded by Imre Dimény	Minister of Agriculture and Food; 1975–1980	Succeeded by Jenő Váncsa
