= Jenő Váncsa =

Hungarian politician (1928–2016)

Minister of Agriculture and Food
- In office 27 June 1980 – 10 May 1989
- Prime Minister: György Lázár; Károly Grósz; Miklós Németh
- Preceded by: Pál Romány
- Succeeded by: Csaba Hütter

Personal details
- Born: 17 October 1928 Braşov, Romania
- Died: 17 January 2016 (aged 87) Agárd, Hungary
- Party: MSZMP
- Profession: Politician

Jenő Váncsa (17 October 1928 – 17 January 2016) was a Hungarian agrarian engineer and former Communist politician, who served as Minister of Agriculture and Food between 1980 and 1989.

On 17 January 2016, he died at the age of 87.

== Sources ==
- Bölöny, József – Hubai, László: Magyarország kormányai 1848–2004 [Cabinets of Hungary 1848–2004], Akadémiai Kiadó, Budapest, 2004 (5th edition).

Political offices
Preceded by Pál Romány	Minister of Agriculture and Food; 1980–1989	Succeeded by Csaba Hütter
