= Gertrud Szabolcsi =

Hungarian biochemist, First Lady of Hungary 1988-1989

Gertrud Szabolcsi (26 January 1923, in Oradea, Romania – 28 March 1993, in Budapest, Hungary) was a biochemist. Her research centered on the structure and function of enzymes. She was a member of the Hungarian Academy of Sciences. She was First Lady of Hungary as the second wife of Brunó Ferenc Straub, the last chairman of the Hungarian Presidential Council from 1988 until 1989.

She and her husband received the 41st president of the United States, George H. W. Bush and his wife, Barbara Bush who visited Hungary on 12 July 1989. Her daughter from her first marriage is linguist Anna Szabolcsi.

== Selected works ==
- P Friedrich, L Polgár, G Szabolcsi, 1964. Effect of Photo-oxidation on Glyceraldehyde-3-phosphate Dehydrogenase. nature.com
- T Devenyi, P Elodi, T Keleti, G Szabolcsi, 1969. Strukturelle Grundlagen der Biologischen Funktion der Proteine. Akadémiai Kiadó.
- B Szajani, M Sajgo, E Biszku, P Friedrich, G Szabolcsi, 1970. Identification of a cysteinyl residue involved in the activity of rabbit muscle aldolase. European Journal of Biochemistry.
- E Biszku, M Sajgo, M Solti, G Szabolcsi, 1973. On the mechanism of formation of a partially active aldolase by tryptic digestion. European Journal of Biochemistry.
- T Devenyi, K. Bocsa, F Kovats, S Pongor, G Szabolcsi, M Such, 1983. Method of modifying the conformation of food and feed proteins. US Patent.
- G Szabolcsi, 1991. Enzimes Analizis. Akadémiai Kiadó.
