= János Kis =

Hungarian philosopher and political scientist

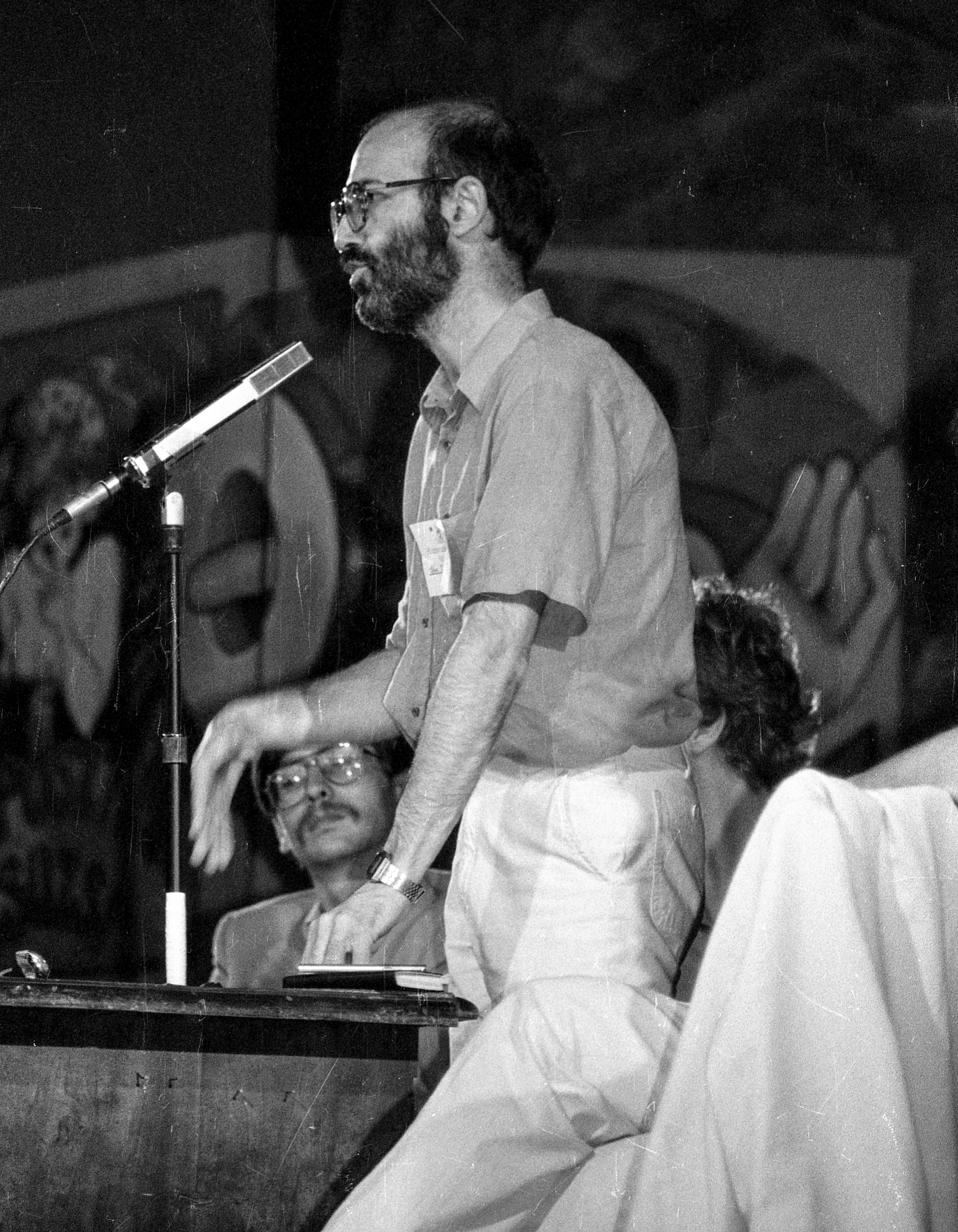
- Kis in 1989

President of the Alliance of Free Democrats
- In office 23 February 1990 – 23 November 1991
- Preceded by: Position established
- Succeeded by: Péter Tölgyessy

Personal details
- Born: 17 September 1943 (age 83) Budapest, Kingdom of Hungary
- Party: SZDSZ (1988–2002)
- Education: Eötvös Loránd University
- Occupation: Philosopher, political scientist

János Kis (born 17 September 1943) is a Hungarian philosopher and political scientist, who served as the inaugural leader of the liberal Alliance of Free Democrats (SZDSZ) from 1990 to 1991. He is considered to be the first Hungarian parliamentary opposition leader.

== Early life ==
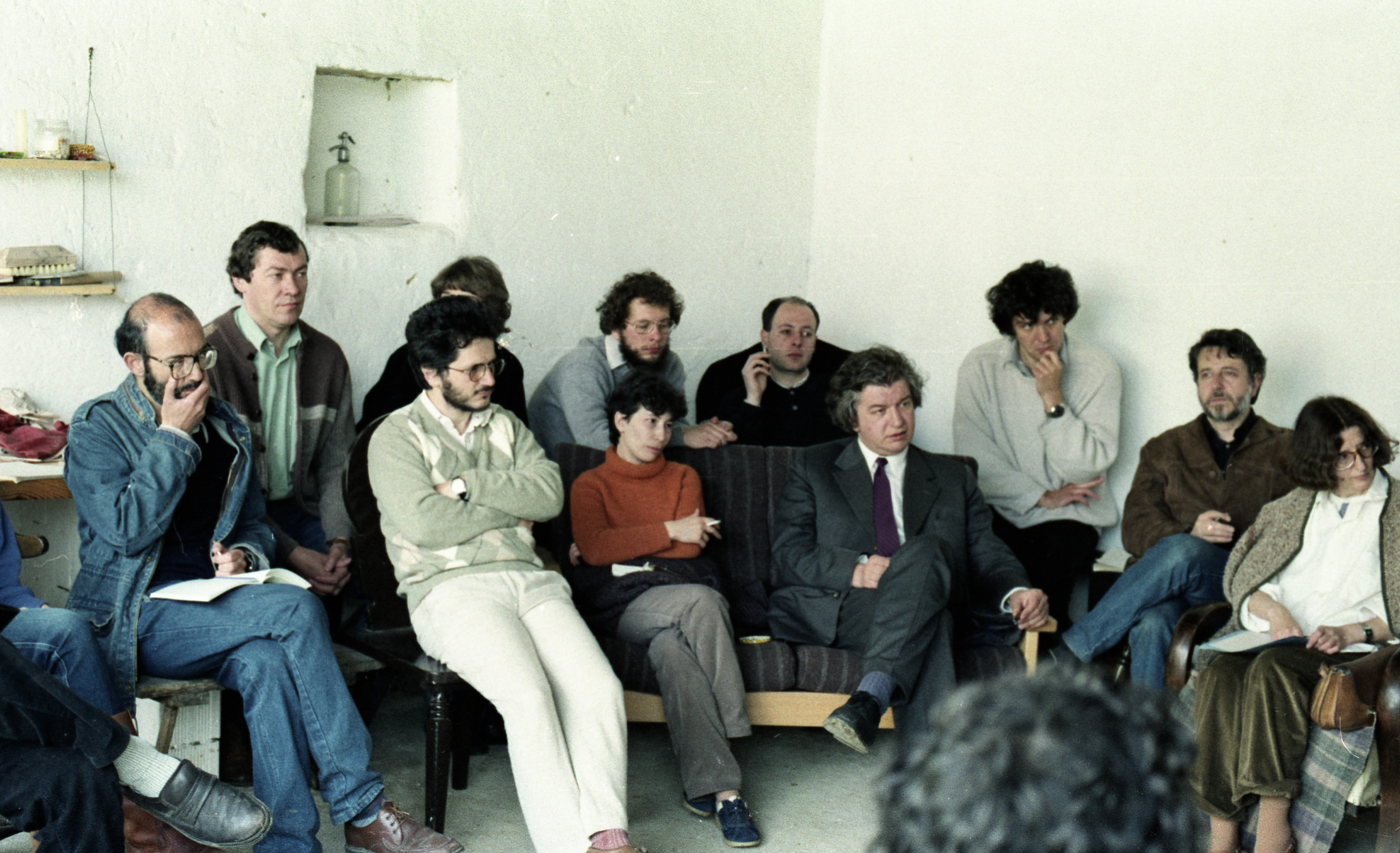
From left to right: János Kis, Iván Bába, Sándor Radnóti in a suit, Ferenc Miszlivetz in a white sweater by the wall, Ferenc Kőszeg next to him. Perőcsény, Hungary, 1987.

Kis was born in Budapest, Hungary. His father was killed in the Holocaust. He graduated with a degree in philosophy from the Eötvös Loránd University in 1967. Kis was inspired by the ideas of György Lukács and György Márkus, and became Marxist in the 1960s. He joined the Hungarian Communist Party (MSZMP) too. In 1973, he was dismissed as a researcher at the Institute of Philosophy at the Hungarian Academy of Sciences after co-authoring a book criticizing Marxist socialism from a leftist point of view. He was excluded from the MSZMP as well.

== Career ==
On a radical leftist and human-rights-liberal basis, he strongly opposed the communist regime in Hungary; he helped to create the first opposition journal Beszélő which was first issued in December 1981. He was the Editor-in-Chief of this underground journal until the democratization of the country in 1989. He was also a member of the democratic opposition party Alliance of Free Democrats (SzDSz).

From 1988 to 1989, he was a visiting professor at the New School for Social Research in New York City.

After the fall of communism in 1989–1990, the SzDSz entered the democratic Parliament and Kis was elected as the party leader on 23 February 1990. He remained in this office until 23 November 1991, when he left active politics and returned to an academic career. However, he remained in the SzDSz. He welcomed the coalition of the SzDSz with the Hungarian Socialist Party (MSZP).

In 1992, he became a professor at the Central European University. Since 1996, he has also been a visiting professor at New York University. He left the SzDSz in 2002, when the socialist prime minister, Péter Medgyessy proved to be a former officer of the communist secret service (officer D-209).

Kis has written numerous articles and books on political science, such as Politics as a Moral Problem. Kis also translated a number of philosophical works to Hungarian, including Immanuel Kant's Critique of Pure Reason. Despite having left the political arena years ago, he continues to take controversial positions on several issues.

== Sources ==
- Biography at the New York University Website
- Gale Stokes, The Walls Came Tumbling Down (New York: Oxford University Press, 1993), 88–89.
- Kis János- Hungarian Wikipedia-article: hu:Kis János

Party political offices
| Preceded by Inaugural | President of the Alliance of Free Democrats; 1990–1991 | Succeeded by Péter Tölgyessy |
