= Pál Losonczi =

Hungarian politician (1919–2005)

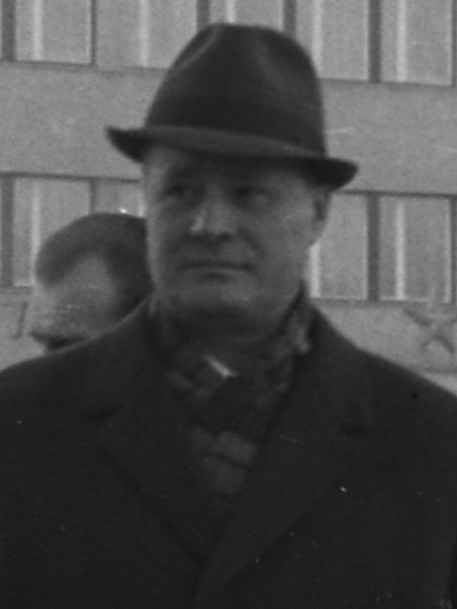
- Losonczi in 1973

Chairman of the Presidential Council of the People's Republic of Hungary
- In office 14 April 1967 – 25 June 1987
- Chairman of the Council of Ministers: Jenő Fock; György Lázár
- Preceded by: István Dobi
- Succeeded by: Károly Németh

Personal details
- Born: Pál Laklia; 18 September 1919 Bolhó, Hungary
- Died: 28 March 2005 (aged 85) Kaposvár, Hungary
- Party: Hungarian Socialist Workers' Party

Pál Losonczi (born Pál Laklia; 18 September 1919 – 28 March 2005) was a Hungarian communist political figure. He was Chairman of the Hungarian Presidential Council (i.e., titular head of state) from 1967 to 1987.

== Honours ==
- Finland : Knight Grand Collar of the Order of the White Rose of Finland (1969).
- Empire of Iran : Commemorative Medal of the 2500th Anniversary of the founding of the Persian Empire (14/10/1971).
- Portugal : Knight Grand Collar of the Order of Prince Henry (14/08/1979).
- Vietnam: Gold Star Order (11/1984).

Political offices
Preceded by Imre Dögei	Minister of Agriculture; 1960–1967	Succeeded by Imre Dimény
Preceded by István Dobi	Chairman of the Hungarian Presidential Council; 1967–1987	Succeeded by Károly Németh
