= Csaba Hütter =

Minister of Agriculture of Hungary (born 1943)

Minister of Agriculture and Food of Hungary
- In office 10 May 1989 – 23 May 1990
- Prime Minister: Miklós Németh
- Preceded by: Jenő Váncsa
- Succeeded by: Ferenc József Nagy (Minister of Agriculture)

Personal details
- Born: 10 May 1943 (age 83) Mohol, Kingdom of Hungary
- Party: MSZMP
- Profession: politician

Csaba Hütter (born 10 May 1943) is a Hungarian agrarian engineer and former Communist politician, who served as Minister of Agriculture and Food between 1989 and 1990.

Political offices
Preceded by Jenő Váncsa	Minister of Agriculture and Food; 1989–1990	Succeeded by Ferenc József Nagy
