= Franz Sartori =

Austrian writer (1782–1832)

- Born: 7 March 1782; Unzmarkt, Styria, Austria
- Died: 31 March 1832; Vienna, Austria
- Occupations: Writer, editor, geographer
- Writing career
- Language: German
- Genres: Topography, geography, Biedermeier literature
- Notable works: Historisch-ethnographische Uebersicht; Neueste Reisen durch Österreich

Franz Sartori (7 March 1782 – 31 March 1832) was an Austrian writer. Primarily writing on the subjects of topography and geography, he was one of the most prolific writers of Biedermeier Vienna.

== Biography ==
Sartori was born on 7 March 1782 in Unzmarkt in Styria, a region of Austria. His father was a servant of Karl Philipp, Prince of Schwarzenberg. He studied philosophy at the University of Graz.

Sartori's earliest articles were written for a magazine published by Karl Andree in Brno. His first profession was as an accounting clerk in Graz in 1802. His preference for solitude and study led him to join the Minorite Order in Graz, and he was for a time a preacher in the parish church of Mariahilf, but his acquaintance, the naturalist and geographer Josef August Schultes, convinced him to leave the order in 1804 and take up writing as his profession. After leaving the order he edited the periodical Allgemeines Zeitungsblatt für Innerösterreich, to which he also contributed scientific and geographic articles on the topic of his native Styria.

In February 1806 he went to University of Vienna and in 1807 he obtained a doctorate in medicine. In 1808, he took a degree in botany at the University of Erlangen.

Schultes did much to support Sartori in Vienna. Sartori took over Schultes as the editor of the well-known journal, Annalen der Litteratur des österreichischen Kaiserstaates. Through this position, he was able to meet many of the outstanding intellectual and political figures in Vienna. In 1808, he took a post at the Vienna censor's office and by 1812, he was its head. He held the position of censor until his death.

The Österreichisches Biographisches Lexikon refers to Sartori as one of the most prolific writers of early Biedermeier Vienna. He wrote about two dozen books and many more articles. Sartori took many trips around the Austrian Alps and wrote often on them. He was held in high esteem by Archduke John of Austria, fellow promoter of those Alps, and his large travel journal Neueste Reisen durch Oesterreich was dedicated to the Archduke. His travel writings have not been very well received, mostly regarded as uncritical compilations from previous sources. His most acclaimed work, the Historisch-ethnographische Uebersicht, was intended as an overview of the intellectual culture of Austria, but it was left unfinished because of his premature death. The only volume published concerns the non-German literature of Austria.

Sartori died in Vienna on 31 March 1832, aged 50.

== Works ==
- Naturwunder des österreichischen Kaiserthumes. 1807/1809 (4 volumes)
- Länder- und Völker-Merkwürdigkeiten des österreichischen Kaiserthumes. 1809 (4 volumes)
- Lebensbeschreibungen berühmter Helden. 1809
- Neueste Reise durch Österreich. 1807
- Taschenbuch für Marienbads Curgäste. 1819
- Oesterreichs Tibur, oder Natur- und Kunstgemählde aus dem oesterreichischen Kaiserthume. 1819
- Historisch-ethnographische Uebersicht der wissenschaftlichen Cultur, Geistesthätigkeit und Litteratur des österr. Kaiserthums nach seinen mannigfaltigen Sprachen und deren Bildungsstufen. 1830 (1 volume, unfinished)
