= Berzeviczy Gergely School of Trade and Catering =

Coordinates: 48°6′16″N 20°47′3″E

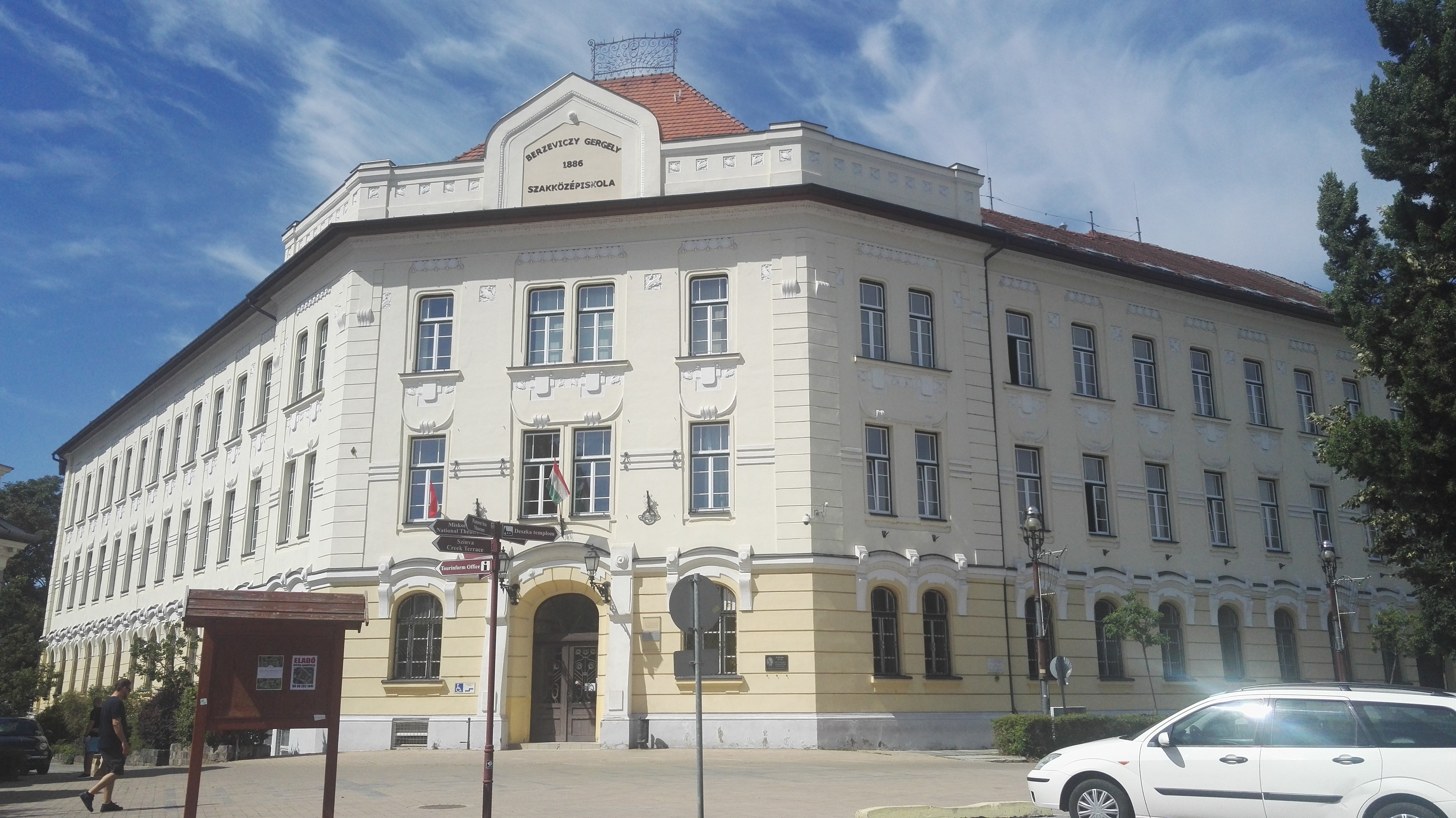
Exterior view

Berzeviczy Gergely School of Trade and Catering, situated in Miskolc, is one of the oldest schools in Hungary.

== History ==
The school was founded in 1886, the ceremony to mark its opening was on 11 September 1886. First it was a school only for boys, who studied at three grades between 26 and 33 hours a week. It became state property in 1896.

After the World War I Higher Trade Boys' School, what was the school's name in that period, it became one of the biggest trade secondary school in Hungary. People in the area who worked in trade liked sending their children here, but banking, railway and economical studies were also taught. It was named after Ferenc Deák between 1925 and 1949, then in 1961 the name was changed again to Gergely Berzeviczy, who was an economist.

The school was situated in three different buildings, moved to its final place in 1908.

The biggest change in “Berze”'s life was in 1968, when technical training in the field of catering was added to the curriculum. In 1989–1990, at the time of political change of regime of Hungary, the Berzeviczy met new challenges in the field of social economics. Privatization appeared at first in the trades of the school; more and more private companies were founded, which expected different knowledge of students than previously. The reaction was quite fast, in the school year of 1991/1992 reforms of programs and organization started connecting to the National Technical Training Institute. Teachers of Berzeviczy started to renew the syllabus; some of them edited and wrote new textbooks getting big general respect for the school.

Since then there were other innovations in the school's life such as teaching foreign-trade studies or bilingual tourist studies in German. The foreign-trade administrator field of study proved to be very useful and popular. Students can learn foreign languages (English and German) in high number of hours; they get good-quality computer skills as well. There were also changes in the traditional commercial and catering studies because of new requirements of the era. That's why the school introduced subjects such as marketing, law and accountancy and post-graduating technical training.

The school combines theoretical instruction with practical training and maintains partnerships with companies in the trade and catering industries. Its curriculum includes subjects such as marketing and law in addition to core trade subjects, and students participate in vocational competitions. Teachers pursue additional diplomas and degrees as part of ongoing professional development.

== Fields of study nowadays ==
Pre-graduating studies:

- Internal Trade (4 year studies)
- Foreign Trade (5 year studies)
- Tourism (5 year studies)

Post-graduating studies:

- Catering Technician
- Trading Administrator
- Traveling Administrator
