= Miklós Németh =

Prime Minister of Hungary from 1988 to 1990

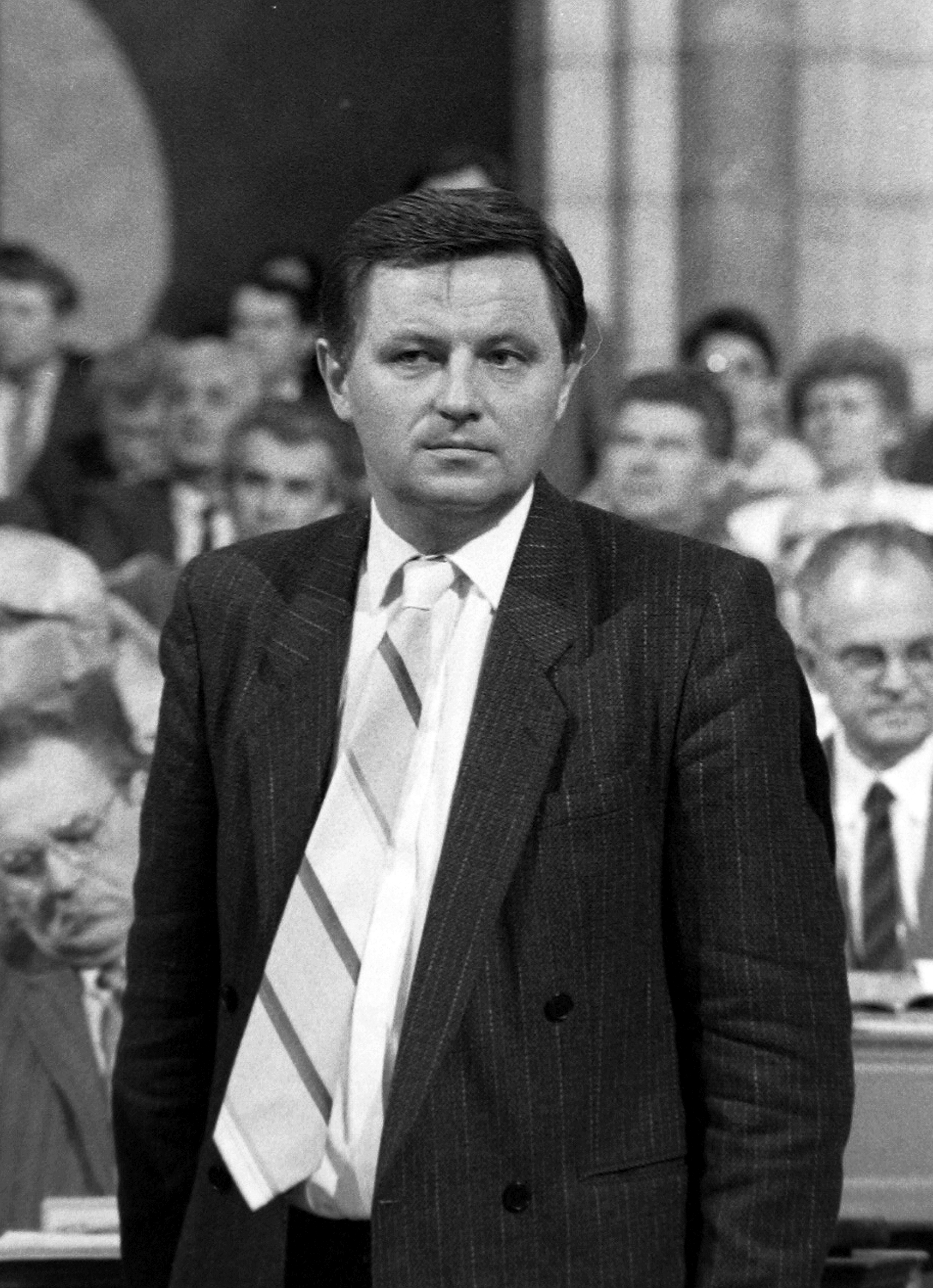
- Németh in 1989

Prime Minister of Hungary (Note: Until 23 October 1989 as Chairman of the Council of Ministers of the Hungarian People's Republic)
- In office 24 November 1988 (Note: Provisional from 23 October 1989) – 23 May 1990
- President: Brunó Ferenc Straub (Note: As Chairman of the Presidential Council, position abolished 23 October 1989.); Mátyás Szűrös (interim); Árpád Göncz (interim)
- Deputy: Péter Medgyessy
- Preceded by: Károly Grósz
- Succeeded by: József Antall

Member of the National Assembly
- In office 5 October 1988 – 22 April 1991

Personal details
- Born: January 24, 1948 (age 78) Monok, Second Hungarian Republic
- Party: MSZMP (1976–1989); MSZP (1989–1990); Independent (since 1990)
- Spouse: Erzsébet Szilágyi
- Profession: Economist, academic professor
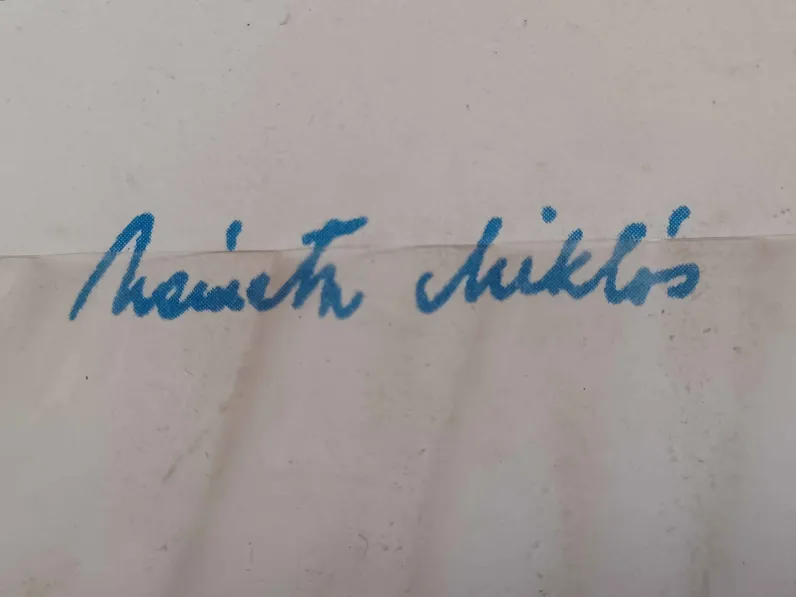
- Signature

Miklós Németh (Note: Hungarian pronunciation: [ˈmikloːʃ ˈneːmɛt]) (born 24 January 1948) is a retired Hungarian economist and politician who served as Prime Minister of Hungary from 24 November 1988 to 23 May 1990. He was one of the leaders of the Socialist Workers' Party, Hungary's communist party, in the tumultuous years that led to the collapse of communism in Eastern and Central Europe. He was the last communist prime minister of Hungary.

== Early life ==
Németh was born into a poor Catholic peasant family on 24 January 1948 in Monok, the birthplace of the revolutionary Lajos Kossuth. He was of Swabian origin on his maternal side. The Stajzs had been resettled by the aristocrat Károlyi family in the 18th century. Németh's grandfather was deported from Monok to the Soviet Union in autumn 1944, and only in 1951 was he able to return home. His father András Németh, a devout Catholic, fought in the Battle of Voronezh and survived the Soviet offensive by the Don River in early 1943. He returned to Hungary in 1946. That kind of dual identity was present in Németh's political life, since he had a Christian family background behind his Communist party career. For instance, when he married Erzsébet Szilágyi in 1971, they also had a church wedding after their civil marriage. Németh was 8 years old during the Hungarian Revolution of 1956. He had just isolated experiences about those events; his parents listened to Radio Free Europe, 1848 flags were erected in the main square of the village, while the local party secretary was arrested and revolutionaries forced him to recite the Lord's Prayer. Németh could not have known the whole truth of the events due to state propaganda and concealment until his studies in the United States.

After finishing elementary school in Szerencs, in 1962 Németh attended Berzeviczy Gergely School of Trade and Catering in Miskolc, where theologian and historian Gábor Deák was one of his teachers. He took his final exam in 1966, after that he was admitted to the Karl Marx University of Economics. Uniquely in the academic system of the communist era, the university had a certain degree of autonomy due to the powerful and influential rector Kálmán Szabó, who had participated in the preparation and production of a major economic reform, called the New Economic Mechanism in 1968, which introduced some market and capitalist elements to the Hungarian economic system. Under this reformist leadership, a new economist intelligentsia emerged, instead of Orthodox Marxist experts, which were already acquainted with the Western mainstream curriculum and they had the opportunity to study abroad.

Németh graduated in 1971, after that he became an assistant lecturer, later a full-time university professor. Németh won a scholarship of International Research & Exchanges Board to the United States for the 1975/76 semesters, where he subsequently attended Harvard University. He learned decision theory, cost–benefit analysis and business law. Németh later was accused by hard-line communist leaders who said that the Central Intelligence Agency (CIA) had recruited him during his Harvard year, however he called these charges "nonsensical".

== Early career ==
Returning home, Németh left the University of Economics and worked for the National Planning Office (OT) from 1977. He also joined the Hungarian Socialist Workers' Party (MSZMP) during this time. He was a theoretical researcher until 1978, when he was transferred to the office's Economics Department. There his role was preparation of shortened plan documents on industrial, agrarian, social etc. surveys, drafts which were dispatched to the Council of Ministers. According to Németh, he then became familiar with the economic reality and the true extent of the huge public debt. The Communist regime and the Hungarian National Bank led a double bookkeeping, even the majority of the party's Political Committee had no information on the real data. Németh began working for the Socialist Workers' Party Economic Department in 1981. He and Ferenc Bartha negotiated with Alan Whittome and Jacques de Larosière, representatives of the International Monetary Fund (IMF) in 1982, but Németh also took part in a conference to resort to loans from China, bypassing the Soviets.

Németh was appointed Head of Economic Department in 1986, when Mikhail Gorbachev became leader of the Soviet Union. Németh, who knew the new Secretary-General earlier, anticipated that a new period would go with social, political, and economic reforms. Németh was promoted to the Central Committee as Secretary in charge of Economic Policy in June 1987. In May 1988, he was elevated to the Politburo. During that time, long-serving Secretary-General János Kádár was replaced by Prime Minister Károly Grósz, who tried to establish a "technocratic" government and commissioned Németh to negotiate with Deutsche Bank aimed at getting a one billion Mark loan.

== Prime Minister of Hungary ==
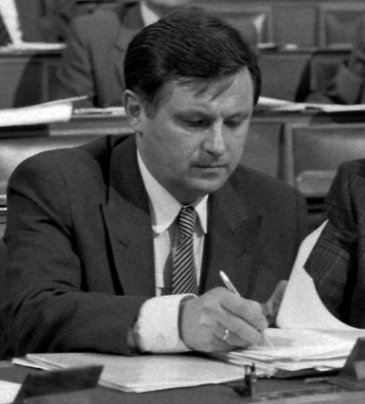
- Premiership of Miklós Németh; 24 November 1988 – 23 May 1990
- President: Brunó F. Straub; Mátyás Szűrös (interim); Árpád Göncz (interim)
- Cabinet: Németh Government
- Party: MSZMP → MSZP

In the summer of 1988, Secretary-General Grósz announced his intention to resign from his position as Prime Minister to focus entirely on the organization of the party. Unlike the previous practice, he nominated four candidates, Rezső Nyers, Imre Pozsgay, Ilona Tatai and Pál Iványi to the post to discuss with local party committees, trade unions and the Patriotic People’s Front. As Grósz was aware of the disastrous economic situation and impending insolvency, Németh was also nominated for the position because he had established a reputation of being an economics expert. Finally the elderly Nyers withdrew himself from candidature in favor of Németh. He took the oath on 24 November 1988, at the time he was the world's youngest head of government until the election of Pakistani Prime Minister Benazir Bhutto in December 1988.

Németh became Prime Minister from a relatively low position as he had never held any ministerial or state secretary posts in the previous governments. He also "inherited" some influential ministers from the Grósz Cabinet (i.e. Frigyes Berecz and István Horváth), which led to the presumption within the party that Németh was Grósz's sidekick in those months. As there had not yet been created a budget for the next year, the system was not sustainable without budget cuts, according to Németh, Grósz's goal was to make his Prime Minister a scapegoat, protecting his power and the communist ideology. Conflicts between hard-line and reformist wings widened when Grósz gave a speech in the Budapest Sportcsarnok in which he made mention of the sharpening of the class struggle and hinted at the possibility of the looming threat of the White terror's return to Hungary. Németh gradually decoupled himself from the party leadership. Grósz, who had no idea that his successor would be self-propelled, even bugged Németh's telephone and the latter's staff later found covert listening devices in the Prime Minister's residence. Over the coming months the hard-line wing got permanently weakened; the Political Committee and the Patriotic People's Front renounced their right to nominate candidates for ministerial positions; and by 10 May 1989, Németh managed to completely revamp the composition of his cabinet. He transformed the cabinet into a "government of experts" whose members were destined to make the transition from one-party dictatorship to democracy. Reformists Gyula Horn, László Békesi, Csaba Hütter, Ferenc Glatz and Ferenc Horváth became members of the cabinet then. After that the Németh government was placed under the authority of the National Assembly instead of the Socialist Workers' Party.

=== Transition to democracy ===
After being promoted to Prime Minister in November 1988, Németh made a controversial decision to allow East Germans, who had long been restricted from traveling, to pass through Hungary on their way to West Germany. This decision is widely regarded as a contributing factor to the fall of the Berlin Wall on 9 November 1989. He became Hungary's first post-Communist Prime Minister after the Hungarian Socialist Workers' Party was transformed into the Hungarian Socialist Party, on 7 October 1989, a left of centre social democratic party - of which Németh was a founding member. Following the passing of constitutional amendments by parliament on 23 October 1989 that removed the Constitution's communist character, Németh became the first (provisional) Prime Minister of the Third Hungarian Republic, and the new leader of Hungary as such.

== After premiership ==
He left office on 23 May 1990, after suffering defeat by József Antall in Hungary's first free elections following the fall of Communism. He was an independent MP for Szerencs until April 1991. Németh subsequently served as Vice President of the London-based European Bank for Reconstruction and Development, the financial institution established by the international community to assist the countries of eastern and central Europe and the former Soviet Union in their transition to democratic market economies. In 2000, he left the EBRD to return to Hungary. He attempted to become the PM-designate of the opposition socialist party, but was unsuccessful, as Péter Medgyessy was appointed to that role. Medgyessy later became Prime Minister.

In 1993, Németh also received an Honorary Doctorate from Heriot-Watt University.

In 2007, Németh was commissioned by the UN Secretary-General Ban Ki-moon to investigate the illegal use of bounty by the United Nations Development Programme (UNDP) to North Korea. Prior to this, the Central Intelligence Agency had informed Administrator Kemal Derviş that the North Korean regime counterfeited and reprinted sent banknotes, which was part of their food aid. Németh led the three-member inquiry committee which determined the existence of this unauthorized use of funds, and distribution branches in Cairo and Macau. In June 2008, the 380-page report was published.

For his role in the unification of Germany and Europe, in June 2014 Németh received the Point Alpha Prize. Németh also participated in the celebration of the 25th anniversary of the fall of the Berlin Wall, alongside Mikhail Gorbachev, Lech Wałęsa and German politicians. In an interview, Németh said that the demolition of the Berlin Wall happened all of a sudden, but momentum had been building for months that led up to the event, as in March 1989 Gorbachev had promised that the Soviets would not act violently after the opening of the Hungarian border with Austria.

== Sources ==
- Oplatka, András (2014). Németh Miklós - Mert ez az ország érdeke (in Hungarian). Helikon Kiadó. ISBN 9789632276274.
- Tőkés, Rudolf (1998). Hungary's negotiated revolution. Economic reform, social change and political succession. Cambridge University Press.

Political offices
Preceded by Károly Grósz	Prime Minister of Hungary; 1988–1990	Succeeded by József Antall
