= Hungarian Round Table Talks =

1989 talks about a post-Communist state

The Hungarian Round Table Talks (Hungarian: Kerekasztal-tárgyalások) were a series of formalized, orderly and highly legalistic discussions held in Budapest, Hungary in the summer and autumn of 1989, inspired by the Polish model, that ended in the creation of a multi-party constitutional democracy and saw the Communist Party (formally the Hungarian Socialist Workers' Party or MSZMP) lose its 40-year grip on power.

== Background ==
The talks originated in March 1989 as a meeting among opposition groups. At that point, longtime leader János Kádár had been removed from power for almost a year, and the Communists' Central Committee that month admitted the necessity of a multiparty system, with various groups like Fidesz and the Alliance of Free Democrats (SZDSZ) having emerged. Mass demonstrations on March 15, the National Day, persuaded the regime to begin negotiations with the emergent non-Communist political forces. A week later, these new movements, at the initiative of the Independent Lawyers’ Forum, formed the Opposition Round Table (Ellenzéki Kerekasztal, EKA), designed to prevent the Communists from trying to maintain power by dividing the opposition, and to establish some degree of unity in the face of the regime's own reform agenda. The table was composed of a small number of elite organizations, whose grassroots links were poorly developed and whose very existence stemmed in part from the collaboration of key Communist reformers. Specifically, it involved the SZDSZ, Fidesz, the Hungarian Democratic Forum (MDF), the Independent Smallholders’ Party (FKgP), the Hungarian People's Party (MNP), the Endre Bajcsy-Zsilinszky Society, and the Democratic Trade Union of Scientific Workers. At a later stage the Democratic Confederation of Free Trade Unions and the Christian Democratic People's Party (KDNP) were invited.

The MSZMP, although beleaguered by demands for change from within (in the form of increasingly active Reform Circles), and facing a disintegrating economy, did not meet with the opposition until 22 April. Unlike in Poland, where the lines between the united opposition and the government were clear, Hungary's round table (formally established in June as the National Round Table (Nemzeti Kerekasztal, NKA), with talks beginning on the 13th) was trilateral, also involving unions and quasi-civil society organisations under the party's authority but beginning to distance themselves from it. Instead of a single opposition movement with substantial threat potential (Solidarity), several relatively frail opposition groups which at most could play on the regime's fear of mass demonstrations on the occasion of various commemorations participated. This weakness radicalised their demands, leading to greater government concessions; the opposition, which had an open-ended agenda and could effectively veto proposals, knew from Poland that it either had to negotiate free elections or would begin to lose its legitimacy as representatives of the people.

== Progression ==
The topics of discussions were almost completely unknown to the public. The Communists did their best to prevent wider knowledge of the negotiations, supposedly to prevent them being used as political propaganda. The Opposition Round Table agreed to this suggestion at a meeting on 10 June; this aroused suspicions they were implicated in a behind-the-scenes deal. Some smaller parties outside the table claimed an underhanded bargain between the old and new political elite was taking place without public consultation. The Opposition Round Table did its best to dissipate such suspicions. Indeed, all involved were devoted to a peaceful and democratic transition (to which the regime implicitly agreed through its acceptance of negotiations), and were nervous about uncontrolled popular mobilisation—especially as talks began before the Berlin Wall fell and Solidarity scored a decisive electoral victory. Nevertheless, the 10 June agreement severely limited its room for manoeuvring. The lack of publicity did not cause conflicts between the negotiating elite of the parties and their membership, but it did cause a number of misunderstandings in society at large. It was only when the Round Table agreement was signed on 18 September that the public became fully aware of the different viewpoints represented at the round table; the plenary session dealing with its breakup was broadcast on television.

As the talks advanced (and especially after Imre Nagy was reburied on 16 June), EKA made more detailed and all-encompassing demands: guaranteed free elections and free media access during these, exclusion of political crimes from the criminal code, a prohibition on the use of violence, and de-politicization of the armed forces. The Communists wanted to share the burden of managing the economy, but the opposition refused to take on the task until it entered government and focused on political before economic reform. All involved acknowledged that the "third side" (unions and party organisations) was less important in both the process and outcome; members of the state agencies distanced themselves from the ebbing authority of the party, but were content not to support it, guaranteeing them a lesser role in negotiations. Nevertheless, they ostensibly represented the non-elites not present at the table; issues included their constituents’ concerns, such as wages, self-management, and the maintenance and extension of a social safety net that faced an uncertain future. By and large, these topics were only symbolically and not substantively discussed, with the other two sides focusing on a political solution. It was at the talks that a number of Hungary's future political leaders emerged, including László Sólyom, József Antall, György Szabad, Péter Tölgyessy and Viktor Orbán.

Negotiations broke down frequently, with the two most contentious issues being the electoral system and the presidency (other points of contention were whether the country would be defined as "socialist" in the constitution, and disclosure of Communist Party assets.) The Communists pressed for a presidential system with majority voting. They presumed that the popular Imre Pozsgay, a leader of the Communists' radical reformer faction, would win. The smaller opposition parties wanted a parliamentary system, proportional representation, and a weak presidency. However, they too believed that Pozsgay would be elected president. A party congress was scheduled for October, and reformists had to show something there to legitimise themselves. During negotiations, the MSZMP offered concessions aimed at having Pozsgay elected. In August, they offered to dissolve the Workers' Militia if his candidacy were accepted, and in September, they offered to have the president elected by referendum. (This was presented as a concession, because while popular election would have granted him more legitimacy, the sitting parliament would easily have elected Pozsgay.)

== Conclusion ==
An agreement was reached involving six draft laws that covered an overhaul of the Constitution, establishment of a Constitutional Court, the functioning and management of political parties, multiparty elections for National Assembly deputies, the penal code and the law on penal procedures (the last two changes represented an additional separation of the Party from the state apparatus). The electoral system was a compromise: about half of the deputies would be elected proportionally and half by the majoritarian system. A weak presidency was also agreed upon, but no consensus was attained on who should elect the president (parliament or the people) and when this election should occur (before or after parliamentary elections). Initially, the opposition was united in wanting the president elected by parliament after new elections to ensure parliamentary supremacy and minimise the MSZMP's power. Then, faced with Communist concessions, the relatively weak opposition split, as at least three moderate groups (including KDNP and MDF) signed the Round Table agreement and implicitly accepted Pozsgay as president while the radicals (notably Fidesz and the SZDSZ) refused to do so. After a burst of negotiations, fully free elections were scheduled for March 1990, in contrast to the semi-free elections held in Poland in June 1989.

In the end, the implicit deal on the presidency (the only place where the Communists appeared to have gotten the upper hand) reached in the Round Table Talks was reversed: when the MSZMP dissolved itself in early October and became the Hungarian Socialist Party (MSZP), a majority of members as well as MPs failed to join the new party, and Pozsgay was not elected its leader. In the ensuing power vacuum, the radicals used the very liberal initiative law formulated by the Round Table to successfully campaign for a referendum on four additional issues. The referendum, held on 26 November, asked questions on the dissolution of the party militia, the return of party assets, the elimination of the party from the workplace and whether presidential or parliamentary elections should be held first. They easily obtained the 100,000 signatures needed to place the questions on the ballot. The reform Communists quickly abolished the party militia, promised a full accounting of its assets before the referendum, and removed its cells from the workplace. On the crucial question of the election sequence, the radicals barely satisfied both criteria (55% turnout, with 50% needed, and 50.07% supporting parliamentary elections first). The party-state had been completely dismantled, something the Opposition Round Table had not been strong enough to accomplish on its own. The Communists themselves used the initiative to force a vote on direct election of the president on 29 July 1990, but this failed due to a turnout of just 14%. Instead of a Communist candidate chosen in direct elections before the election of a new parliament, the presidency went to SZDSZ politician Árpád Göncz, elected by the new parliament.
