= University of Pannonia =

University in Veszprém, Hungary

- Pannon Egyetem
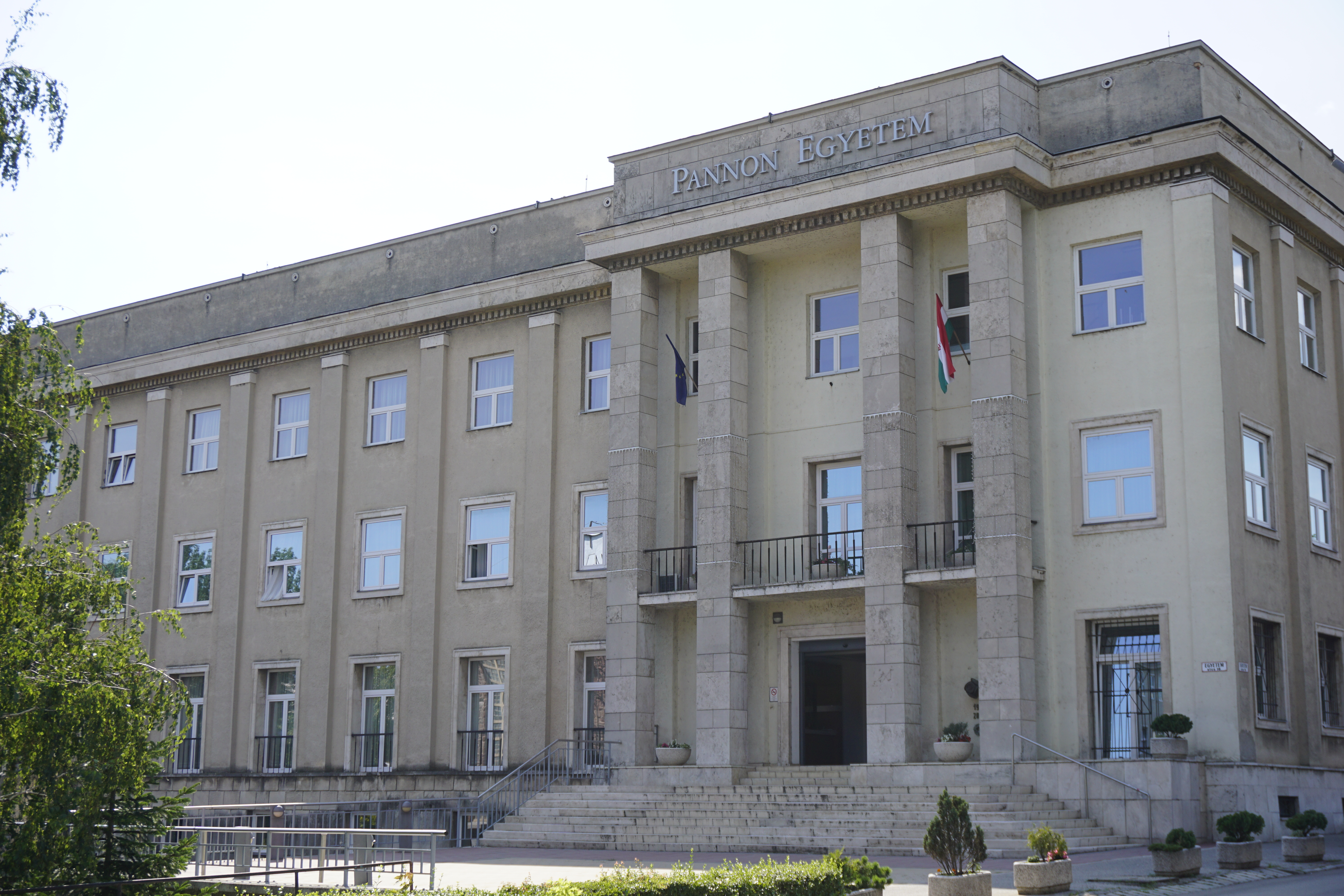
- University of Pannonia front view
- Type: Public
- Established: 1949; 77 years ago
- President: Dr. András Gelencsér
- Students: 9632
- Location: Veszprém, Veszprém County, Hungary; 47°05′19″N 17°54′29″E
- Website: uni-pannon.hu

University rankings

Global – Overall
- QS World: 1200-1400
- THE World: 1500

Regional – Overall
- QS Emerging Europe and Central Asia: 106 (2022)

The University of Pannonia (Hungarian Pannon Egyetem, formerly Veszprémi Egyetem) is a university with its main campus in Veszprém, Hungary. It was founded in 1949 and is organized in four faculties: Humanities, Engineering, Economics, and Informatics. Before 2006, it was named University of Veszprém.

== History ==
The university was founded in 1949. It began as the Chemical Heavy Industry Faculty in Veszprém of the Technical University of Budapest. In 1951, it became independent as Veszprém University of Chemical Engineering.

The university first offered specialization in four areas of chemical technology: Oil and Coal Technology, Electrochemical Industry, Inorganic Chemical Technology, Silicate Chemistry. Increasing economic needs led the university to expand its curriculum. From the mid-1960s two more specializations were added: Nuclear Chemistry and Technology; and Process Control and System Engineering. These were followed by Agrochemistry in 1970, Chemical Engineering Management in 1973, higher level foreign language teaching in 1983, and Instrumentation and Measurement Techniques in 1984, and later Information Technology and Automation.

As a result of the increasing openness of Hungary, the need for teachers of foreign languages increased considerably. Having recognized this, the university introduced training programs for teachers of English, German, and French, and the education of philologists in Hungarian language and literature, theatre sciences. etc. The education of Catholic theologians started in the form of a regional faculty of the Theology College. The programs were organized under the Faculty of Teacher Training (now Faculty of Humanities) and the Faculty of Engineering.

In 1991, the university was renamed as University of Veszprém. A national centre of scientific and cultural life, the University of Veszprém, joined with the 200-year-old Georgikon Faculty of Agriculture, became a three-faculty university in 2000. In 2003, the Faculty of Economics and the Faculty of Informatics were organized. In 2006, the institution was renamed the University of Pannonia.

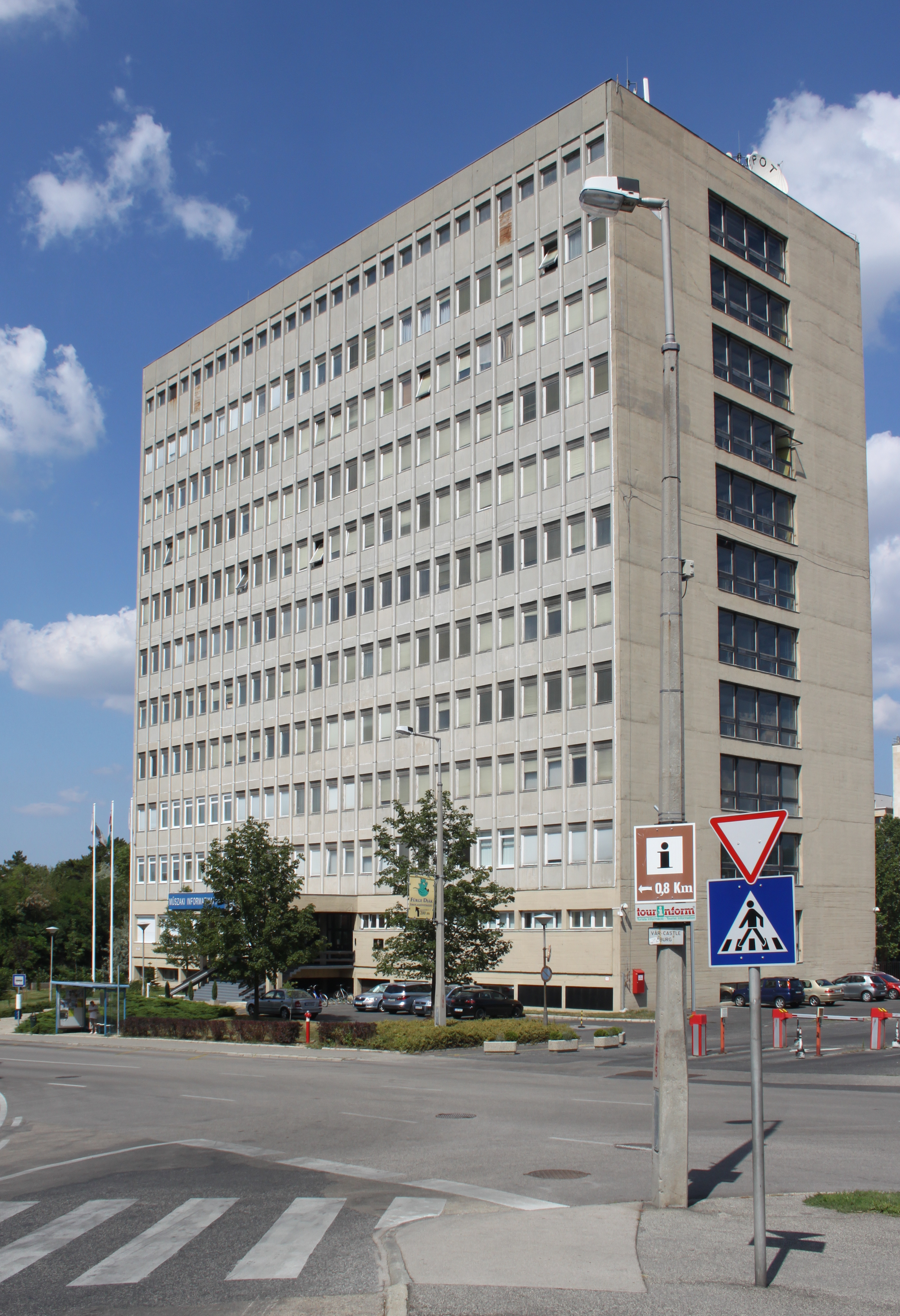
University building in Veszprém

== Organization ==
The University has four faculties:

- Faculty of Economics (Gazdaságtudományi Kar, GTK), located in Veszprém, Zalaegerszeg, and Kőszeg
- Faculty of Engineering (Mérnöki Kar, MK), located in Veszprém, Zalaegerszeg, and Nagykanizsa
- Faculty of Informatics (Műszaki Informatikai Kar, MIK), located in Veszprém, Zalaegerszeg, and Nagykanizsa
- Faculty of Humanities (Humántudományi Kar, HTK), located in Veszprém and Kőszeg

== Rectors ==
Historical rectors of the College and University:

- Károly Polinszky
- Endre Bereczky
- Ernő Nemecz
- Károly Polinszky
- Antal László
- Pál Káldi
- Ernő Nemecz
- János Inczédy
- Bálint Heil
- János Liszi
- István Győri
- Zoltán Gaál
- Ákos Rédey
- Ferenc Friedler
- András Gelencsér (current)

== See also ==
- List of colleges and universities
- Veszprém
- Sándor Dominich

== Bibliography ==
- Meskó Gábor – Mohai Béla (szerk.):A Veszprémi Vegyipari Egyetem évkönyve 1949-1959. Veszprém, 1959, a Veszprémi Vegyipari Egyetem tanácsa, 245 old.
- Schultheisz Zoltán (szerk.): A Veszprémi Vegyipari Egyetem jubileumi évkönyve 1949-1974. Veszprém, 1974, 218 old.
