= Perőcsény =

- Coat of arms

- Location of Perőcsény in Hungary
- Coordinates: 47°59′38.58″N 18°51′39.89″E
- Country: Hungary
- Region: Central Hungary
- County: Pest
- Subregion: Szobi
- Rank: Village

Area
  - Total: 41.39 km^{2} (15.98 sq mi)
- Time zone: UTC+1 (CET)
  - Summer (DST): UTC+2 (CEST)
- Postal code: 2637
- Area code: +36 27
- Website: www.perocseny.hu

Perőcsény is a village in Pest county, Hungary.
