= Brunó Ferenc Straub =

Hungarian biochemist (1914–1996)

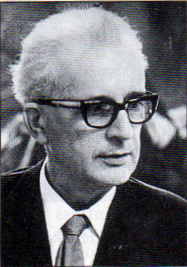

Chairman of the Presidential Council of the People's Republic of Hungary
- In office 29 June 1988 – 23 October 1989
- Chairman of the Council of Ministers: Károly Grósz; Miklós Németh
- Preceded by: Károly Németh
- Succeeded by: Mátyás Szűrös

Personal details
- Born: 5 January 1914 Nagyvárad, Austria-Hungary (now Oradea, Romania)
- Died: 15 February 1996 (aged 82) Budapest
- Party: Hungarian Socialist Workers' Party
- Spouse(s): Erzsébet Lichneckert (1940–1967); Gertrud Szabolcsi (1972–1993)
- Children: 2 daughters

Brunó Ferenc Straub (5 January 1914 in Nagyvárad, Austria-Hungary (now Oradea, Romania) – 15 February 1996) was a biochemist. As a young scholar he was a research assistant of Albert Szent-Györgyi at the University of Szeged, and subsequently worked at the Molteno Institute, Cambridge, UK. He was the first to obtain actin in a relatively pure state. He founded the Biological Research Centre in Szeged. He was the chairman of the Hungarian Presidential Council from 29 June 1988 to 23 October 1989. He proposed the theory of conformational selection in 1964, the same year the Monod–Wyman–Changeux model was proposed.

Political offices
Preceded by Károly Németh	Chairman of the Hungarian Presidential Council; 1988–1989	Succeeded by Mátyás Szűrös as President of Hungary
