= László Berényi =

Hungarian politician

Member of the National Assembly
- In office 14 May 2010 – 5 May 2014

Personal details
- Born: 24 November 1964 (age 61) Barcs, Hungary
- Party: Lungo Drom
- Other political affiliations: Fidesz

László Berényi (born 24 November 1961) is a Hungarian Romani politician who served as a member of the National Assembly from Somogy County Regional List between 2010 and 2014.

== Career ==
Berényi is a member (then also vice-president) of Romani party Lungo Drom since 1994, and a member of Fidesz since 2004. He was a representative of the National Gypsy Council (OCÖ) from 1994 to 2002. He graduated from the Gandhi School in Pécs in 2004. He was a member of the Roma Steering and Monitoring Committee within the Ministry of Social Affairs and Labor, Chairman of the Somogy County Gypsy Minority Self-Government, Representative of the Somogy County Assembly, Chairman of the Minority Committee. In 2007, he obtained the qualification of personnel organizer at the Faculty of Adult Education and Human Resource Development of the University of Pécs. In 2009 he passed the administrative qualification exam.

In the Hungarian Parliament, Berényi was a member of the Committee on Human Rights, Minority, Civic and Religious Affairs from 14 May 2010 to 5 May 2014. After the 2014 parliamentary election, he became leader of the Lungo Drom caucus in the National Roma Self-Government. He succeeded his ally Flórián Farkas as head of the Bridge to the World of Work ("Híd a munka világába") project in January 2016, which is being prosecuted for suspected budget fraud.

It was reported in September 2017 that his company left behind hundreds of tons of illegal garbage on the outskirts of the village Egyházasharaszti in Baranya County five years ago, in 2012.

Berényi is a father of six children.
