= Mihály Lukács =

Hungarian politician (1954–2012)

Member of the National Assembly
- In office 15 May 2002 – 15 May 2006

Personal details
- Born: 19 November 1954 Tiszapüspöki, Hungary
- Died: 18 October 2012 (aged 57)
- Party: Lungo Drom
- Other political affiliations: Fidesz–KDNP
- Profession: politician

Mihály Lukács (19 November 1954 – 18 October 2012) was a Hungarian Romani politician, a founding member of the Lungo Drom party. He was a member of the National Assembly (MP) from Fidesz National List between 2002 and 2006.

He worked in the Committee on Employment and Work (2002–2005) and in the Committee on Youth and Sports (2005–2006). He served as Vice-President of the National Gypsy/Roma Council (OCÖ/ORÖ) since 1999. Lukács died on 18 October 2012, at the age of 57, following a long illness.
