= Félix Farkas =

Hungarian Romani politician

National Advocate of the Romani minority of Hungary
- In office 6 May 2014 – 1 May 2022
- Constituency: National Roma Self-Government

Personal details
- Born: 21 April 1960 (age 66) Mezőkövesd, Hungary
- Party: Lungo Drom
- Other political affiliations: Fidesz–KDNP
- Education: University of Miskolc

Félix Farkas (born 21 April 1960) is a Hungarian Romani politician from the Lungo Drom party who was the National Advocate of the Romani minority of Hungary (National Roma Self-Government (Hungarian: Országos Roma Önkormányzat, ORÖ).

== Biography ==
Félix Farkas was born 21 April 1960. He worked as a construction worker from 1975 before studying at the University of Miskolc, graduating in 2007. He was a member of the Mezőkövesd municipal council from 1994 to 2006, and from 2003 served as vice president of the Lungo Drom party. He was first elected to the National Assembly as the national advocate of the National Roma Self-Government in the 2014 Hungarian parliamentary election.

Farkas was involved in a crisis within the ORÖ during the 2022 Hungarian parliamentary election after non-Lungo Drom members of the ORÖ attempted to remove him as their representative to the National Assembly. Farkas's opponents, who supported ORÖ president János Agócs, accused Farkas of being inactive as an advocate for Romani interests, noting that in the 2014–2018 term he gave only three speeches to the National Assembly and that he more frequently criticised opponents of prime minister Viktor Orbán. Agócs was elected as the candidate of the ORÖ in a 9 November 2021 secret ballot; Lungo Drom subsequently appealed to the Constitutional Court of Hungary alleging that a secret ballot had been illegal, and the Constitutional Court ruled in the party's favour, forcing new elections. As a result of the dispute, the ORÖ was unable to submit a representative before the legal deadline, removing their representatives from the National Assembly.

Farkas was further involved in scandal after recordings leaked apparently showing Attila Sztojka bribing members of the ORÖ to vote for Farkas as representative. Agócs filed a criminal complaint, and came under investigation from the Central Investigative Prosecutor's Office on corruption charges in February 2022 after Agócs filed a criminal complaint alleging that Farkas had promised kickbacks to members of local government bodies of the ORÖ. Attila Sztojka was also accused by the ORÖ of participating in the scheme.

Since leaving office, Farkas has become a critic of Lungo Drom leader Flórián Farkas (unrelated), accusing him of attempting to influence members of the ORÖ to support Lungo Drom's policies.
