= Minorities Act =

1993 organic law of Hungary

Minorities Act Kisebbségi törvény

National Assembly
- Long title: Act LXXVII of 1993 on the Rights of National and Ethnic Minorities; 1993. évi LXXVII. törvény a nemzeti és etnikai kisebbségek jogairól
- Citation: 1993. évi LXXVII. törvény
- Territorial extent: Hungary
- Enacted: 22 July 1993
- Signed by: President Árpád Göncz
- Signed: 1994
- Repealed: 19 December 2011

Codification
- Acts repealed: Nationalities Act of 1868
- Voting summary: 1 (Aladár Horváth) voted against

Repealed by
- Act CLXXIX of 2011

Summary
- Establishes protections for minorities, provides for their autonomy and secures their human rights as integral to the Hungarian state.

Keywords
- Autonomy, Hungarian irredentism, minority rights, racial segregation, Romani people, self-governance
- Status: Repealed

The Minorities Act (Hungarian: Kisebbségi törvény), formally known as the Act LXXVII of 1993 on the Rights of National and Ethnic Minorities (Hungarian: 1993. évi LXXVII. törvény a nemzeti és etnikai kisebbségek jogairól), was a 1993 organic law of Hungary establishing protections for the country's minority population. One of the most progressive laws on minority rights in Europe, its enforcement was hampered by the Hungarian government's usage of the law to marginalise minorities and create racially-segregated communities, particularly with respect to Romani people, and attempts to use it to encourage countries with prevalent Hungarian diaspora populations to adopt similar laws. The law was abolished in December 2011.

== Background ==
Proposals over what would eventually become the Minorities Act began in 1988, during the end of communism in Hungary. Soviet nationalities policy had been emulated by the government of the Hungarian People's Republic, and the Hungarian opposition was eager to make a clean break with the communist past. More importantly in the consideration of a new law on minority rights, however, was securing international support as well as seeking to pressure neighbouring countries to adopt similar policies. Formerly-communist states began adopting laws on minority rights in November 1989, when Lithuania did so in an effort to mitigate Russian and Polish separatism. This was followed by Croatia and Latvia in 1991 and Belarus and Ukraine in 1992; in all cases, minority rights legislation was largely adopted in order to secure the support of Western countries and, according to academic Balázs Dobos, "aimed to project a democratic, multicultural image to the outside world in recognition of the country's independence".

The Roundtable of National and Ethnic Minorities in Hungary was established in early 1991 as an umbrella organisation uniting various traditional minorities and the Romani people, seeking to influence the drafting of a minority rights law. Throughout the year, they were joined by additional groups representing Jews and Rusyns. Another organisation, the Ukrainian Rusyn Cultural Association of Hungary, was established in July after a joint agreement between Hungary's government and the Ukrainian Soviet Socialist Republic was signed guaranteeing minority rights in both countries; it did not join the Roundtable.

The decision to use a list of minorities was made deliberately to prevent newly established minority groups, including Arabs, Chinese people and Russians, from obtaining the same rights as ethnic groups defined as autochthonous under the act. The European Roma Rights Centre criticised this in 2001 as being specifically designed to exclude non-White ethnic groups. The Hungarian government later defended this part of the act, as well as othersexcluding refugees, immigrants, non-citizens and nomads, by arguing that its obligations and responsibilities differed from those that belonged to ethnic minorities. The Roundtable initially proposed a definition of ethnic minorities based on the works of Italian academic Francesco Capotorti, stating "a group numerically inferior to the rest of the population of a State, in a non-dominant position, whose members — being nationals of the State — possess ethnic, religious or linguistic characteristics differing from those of the rest of the population and show, if only implicitly, a sense of solidarity, directed towards preserving their culture, traditions, religion or language". Such a definition was protested by the Ministry of Finance, which argued that an unclear number of minority groups would make the law unenforceable.

The Ministry of Interior caused controversy surrounding the act in early 1992, defining all minorities besides Romani people as "national" minorities (including the Rusyns, who lack an independent state); under the Ministry of Interior's draft, the Romani were given less rights than the national minorities. This draft was rejected by the Roundtable, and in May 1992 a compromise was reached whereby the minorities whose rights were established under the act were guaranteed equal rights, with the list of minorities being adjusted to exclude Jews after it became clear that the Jewish organisation at the Roundtable was unpopular among the Hungarian Jewish community.

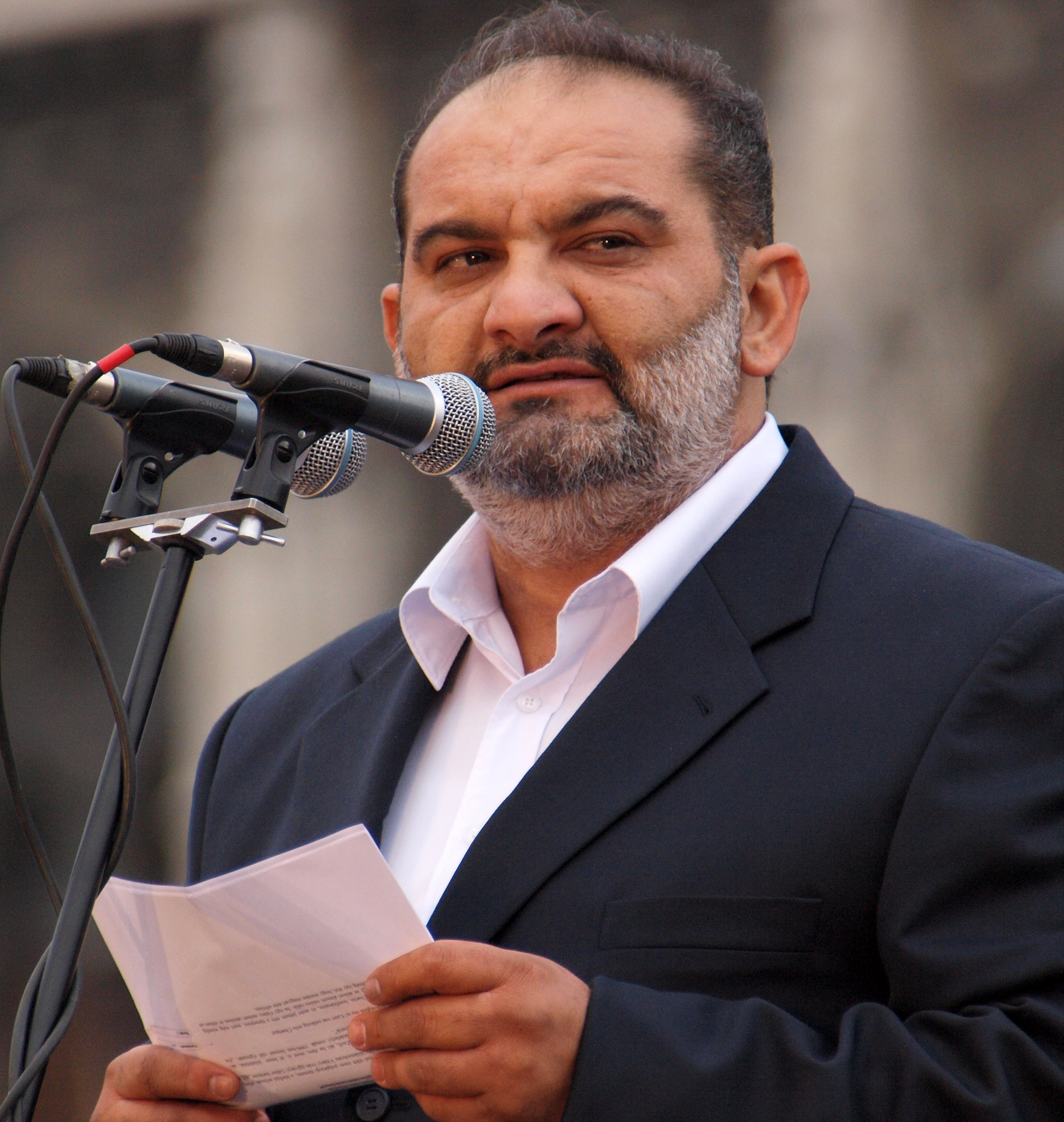
Aladár Horváth was the only member of the National Assembly to vote against the Minorities Act, arguing that the act provided a legal basis for segregation and state control over Romani people

The Minorities Act was passed on 22 July 1993, with 96% of parliamentarians voting in favour. The sole vote against the act came from Aladár Horváth of the Alliance of Free Democrats. Horváth, a leading figure of the Romani civil rights movement in Hungary, argued that the act would provide the Hungarian state with a legal means to engage in racial segregation against Romani, establish state control over their political activities and further separate them from mainstream Hungarian politics. Other progressively-minded Romani community leaders also protested the act for similar reasons, fearing it would allow the government total control over Romani political leadership.

Athanasios Yupsanis of the Aristotle University of Thessaloniki has argued that the Minorities Act is inspired by Austromarxism, noting the recognition of minority self-government and group rights, as well as delegation of some powers to ethnically based governments.

== Law ==
An organic law, the Minorities Act established group rights for minorities, allowing for autonomous self-government institutions to be established both at a local and national level. Local self-governing institutions could be established in any settlement, village or urban district of Hungary; by 30 June 2000 the total number of self-governing local bodies was 1,300. Minorities were permitted to use their language in the National Assembly, in contacting government agencies and in court; in majority minority areas, civil servants were required to speak in that minority's language, and bilingual traffic signs were to be erected. Minorities were also allowed to establish educational institutions in their own languages and enroll their children in them. Local elections to local self-governments took place every four years, beginning in 1994.

The act distinguished between "national minorities", who were represented by an extant state, and "ethnic minorities", who were not. Romani people and Rusyns fell into the latter category, while all other minorities were in the former category. This practice was not always followed, such as a 1994 incident in which Prime Minister József Antall met with Indian diplomats, rather than representatives of the Romani community, at the ceremony for the act's signing. The full list of national minorities was as follows:

- Armenians
- Bulgarians
- Croatians
- Germans
- Greeks
- Polish people
- Romanians
- Serbs
- Slovaks
- Slovenes
- Ukrainians

In order to be recognised as a national or ethnic minority, an ethnic group needed to demonstrate that it had existed in Hungary for "three generations", or one hundred years. Members of the minority were required to possess Hungarian citizenship, as well as a distinct language and culture. If a minority group not included in the act wished to obtain official recognition, it required a petition signed by 1,000 voters declaring their status as part of a given minority to be presented to the Speaker of the National Assembly. The 100-year limit was criticised by both the Venice Commission and the United Nations Human Rights Committee for its restrictive nature, with the latter arguing that the clause was incompatible with the International Covenant on Civil and Political Rights. Several ethnic groups, including Lithuanians, Székelys, Bunjevci, Italians and a group of Slovenes referring to themselves as a distinct ethnic group called "Vends", attempted to obtain recognition, but none were successful.

The Minorities Act replaced the Nationalities Act of 1868, which had to that date been the most recent Hungarian legislation concerning minorities. It was amended in 2005 to prevent non-minorities from voting in minorities' self-government elections. It was repealed and replaced by Act CLXXIX of 2011, which decreased self-governments' powers while maintaining the broad structure of the 1993 Minorities Act.

== Irredentist and segregational usage ==
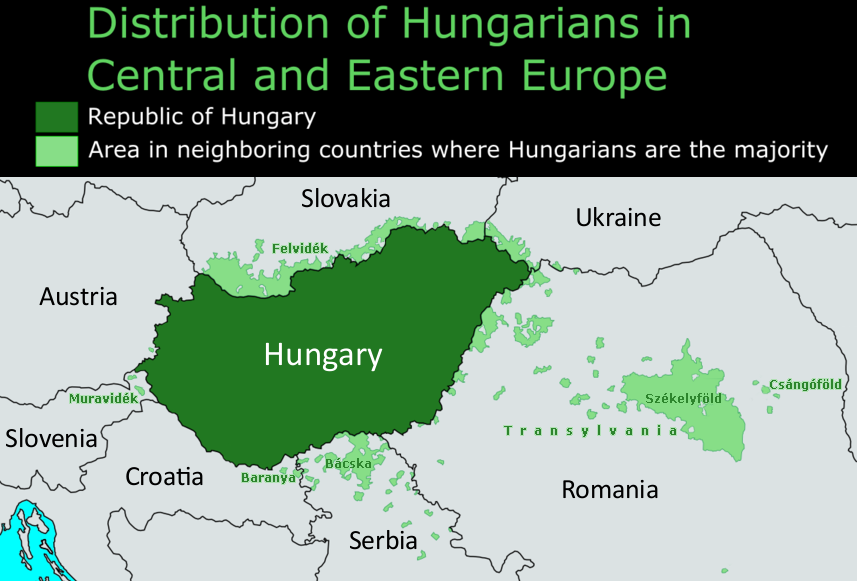
Map of the Hungarian diaspora in Central and Eastern Europe according to László Sebők, 1989–1992. The Hungarian government used the Minorities Act as part of an irredentist project to encourage neighbouring states to legalise Hungarian autonomy.

The Hungarian government and general population, from the outset, expected that the Minorities Act would encourage Hungary's neighbours to adopt similar laws, enabling autonomy for the sizeable Hungarian diaspora. Daily newspaper Magyar Hírlap on 9 July 1993 reported that the government viewed the law as contributing to "the development of legal guarantees based on the most notable European values". Following the law's passage, the chairman of the Government Office for Hungarian Minorities Abroad was appointed as a member of a council on Romani issues; the Hungarian government continued to refer to the Minorities Act throughout the 1990s and 2000s in international efforts to secure autonomy for ethnic Hungarians in broader Central and Eastern Europe.

The National Roma Self-Government was, according to Human Rights Watch, subjected to electoral interference by the Hungarian government. Timothy William Waters and Rachel Guglielmo, writing in the Harvard Human Rights Journal, also argued that the Horn Government interfered in the 1995 local elections to support the Lungo Drom party, which had ties to the ruling Hungarian Socialist Party–Alliance of Free Democrats coalition. Lungo Drom received 21.43 million Hungarian forints from 1993 to 1996, more than all other Romani parties, and captured all 53 seats in the Romani autonomous parliament.

Romani academic Angéla Kóczé argued in 2015 that Romani fears of racially-segregated communities resulting from the Minorities Act had been "generally confirmed", noting Lungo Drom's continued connections to the Hungarian government under the Fidesz party during the Orbán era via Lungo Drom leader Flórián Farkas. Kinga Göncz and Sándor Geskó of Romani integration-focused non-governmental organisation Partners-Hungary have argued that the main drivers of the failures of Romani self-government under the Minorities Act resulted from representatives being "lack of knowledge and experience in the skills and processes of self-government" and competition between Roma communities over financial resources, as well as anti-Romani sentiment among non-minority municipalities.
