= Valentiny =

Valentiny is a surname. Notable people with the surname include:

- Ágoston Valentiny (1888–1958), Hungarian politician and jurist
- François Valentiny (born 1953), Luxembourgian architect
- János Valentiny (1842–1902), Hungarian painter

== See also ==
- Valentine (name)
- Valentino (surname)
