= Kalyi Jag =

Kalyi Jag may refer to:

- Kalyi Jag (album), 2000 debut album to Ektomorf
- Kalyi Jag (group), a Hungarian Romani folk music group
