= Romani people in Hungary =

Ethnic group

Romane manusha ando Ungro (Romani)
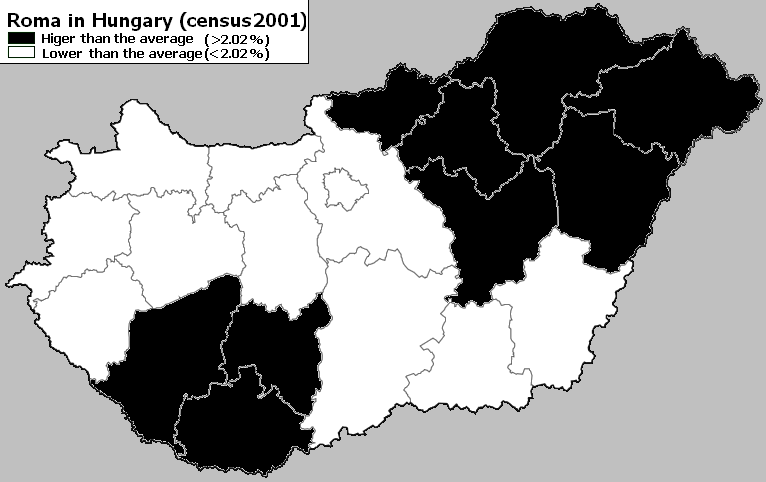

Total population
- 315,583 (census 2011); Estimates: 450,000 to 800,000

Regions with significant populations
- Borsod-Abaúj-Zemplén County: 58,246
- Szabolcs-Szatmár-Bereg County: 44,133
- Pest County: 20,065
- Budapest: 19,530
- Heves County: 19,312
- Jász-Nagykun-Szolnok County: 18,935
- Hajdú-Bihar County: 18,132
- Baranya County: 16,995
- Somogy County: 16,167
- Nógrád County: 15,177

Languages
- mainly Hungarian (91–92% in 2001), Carpathian Romani

Religion
- Christianity, Theravada Buddhism, Romani folk religion

Romani people in Hungary (also known as Roma; Hungarian: Romák, magyar cigányok) are the Romani people living in Hungary. According to the 2011 census, they comprise 3.18% of the total population, which alone makes them the largest minority in the country, although various estimations have put the number of Romani people as high as 8.8% of the total population. They are sometimes referred as Hungarian Gypsies, but that is sometimes considered to be a racial slur.

== History and language ==
=== Origin ===
The Romani people originate from Northern India, from the northwestern Indian regions of Rajasthan and Punjab.

The linguistic evidence has indisputably shown that roots of Romani language lie in India: the language has grammatical characteristics of Indo-Aryan languages and shares with them a big part of the basic lexicon, for example, body parts or daily routines.

More exactly, Romani shares the basic lexicon with Hindi and Punjabi. It shares many phonetic features with Marwari, while its grammar is closest to Bengali.

Genetic findings in 2012 suggest the Romani originated in northwestern India and migrated as a group. According to a genetic study in 2012, the ancestors of present scheduled tribes and scheduled caste populations of northern India, traditionally referred to collectively as the Ḍoma, are the likely ancestral populations of modern European Roma.

In February 2016, during the International Roma Conference, the Indian Minister of External Affairs stated that the people of the Roma community were children of India. The conference ended with a recommendation to the Government of India to recognize the Roma community spread across 30 countries as a part of the Indian diaspora.

=== Migration to Hungary ===
The date of the arrival of the first Romani groups in Hungary cannot exactly be determined. Sporadic references to persons named Cigan, Cygan or Chygan or to villages named Zygan can be found in charters from the 13th–14th centuries. However, persons bearing these names may not have been Romani, and it has not been proven that Zygan was inhabited by Romani people in the 14th century. Accordingly, these names seem to have derived from an Old Turkic word for straight hair (sÿγan), instead of referring to Romani people in Hungary.

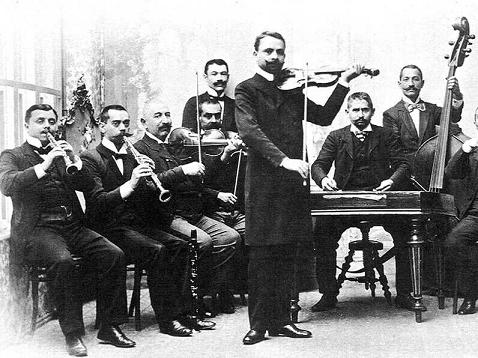
Romani orchestra in the 1890s, Kolozsvár (Cluj, Klausenburg)

Romani people first arrived in Hungary in the 14th and 15th centuries, an event which was probably connected to the collapse of Byzantine power in Anatolia, where they had likely been resident for several hundred years. (Note: Yaron Matras, in Encyclopedia of Language and Linguistics, writes that the Romani migration from India could not have occurred until the second half of the first millennium A.C.E. – well before the Ottoman expansion.) Their presence in the territory of the medieval Kingdom of Hungary was first recorded in a chapter by Mircea the Old, prince of Wallachia, who held the Fogaras (Făgăraș) region in fief as vassal to the Hungarian Crown between 1390 and 1406. The charter makes mention of 17 "tent-dwelling Gypsies" (Ciganus tentoriatos) who were held by a local boyar Costea, lord of Alsó- and Felsővist and of Alsóárpás (now Viștea de Jos, Viștea de Sus and Arpașu de Jos in Romania). Next, the financial accounts of the town of Brassó (now Brașov in Romania) recorded a grant of food to "Lord Emaus the Egyptian" and his 120 followers in 1416. Since Romani people were often mentioned as either "Egyptians" or "the Pharaoh's People" in this period, Lord Emaus and his people must have been Romani.

=== Hungarian Roma in the late Medieval and Early Modern periods ===
While the Romani populations of Western and Central Europe faced severe legal persecution in the 15th and 16th century, the diets of Hungary and Transylvania did not pass any anti-Roma legislation during this period. This difference can be explained by the contemporary political and military confrontation between these polities and the growing power of the Ottoman Empire. The Roma population were utilised as soldiers, in the construction and maintenance of fortifications and as craftsmen with responsibility for the production of weapons and ammunition. After the partition of Hungary which followed the Battle of Mohács, the majority of the Roma population was concentrated in the Eastern Hungarian Kingdom. They are recorded as participating in a wide range of economic activity in urban areas, as well as trades connected with metalworking. Throughout this period there was a continued demand for Roma labour in the Eastern Hungarian Kingdom, with towns and nobles competing for Roma labour and the tax income which they generated. During the 16th and 17th centuries, the Roma also acquired a reputation as musicians, and records show that Roma musicians were highly valued by the nobility, although the overall number of Roma in all Hungarian territories remained small.

==== Ottoman Period ====
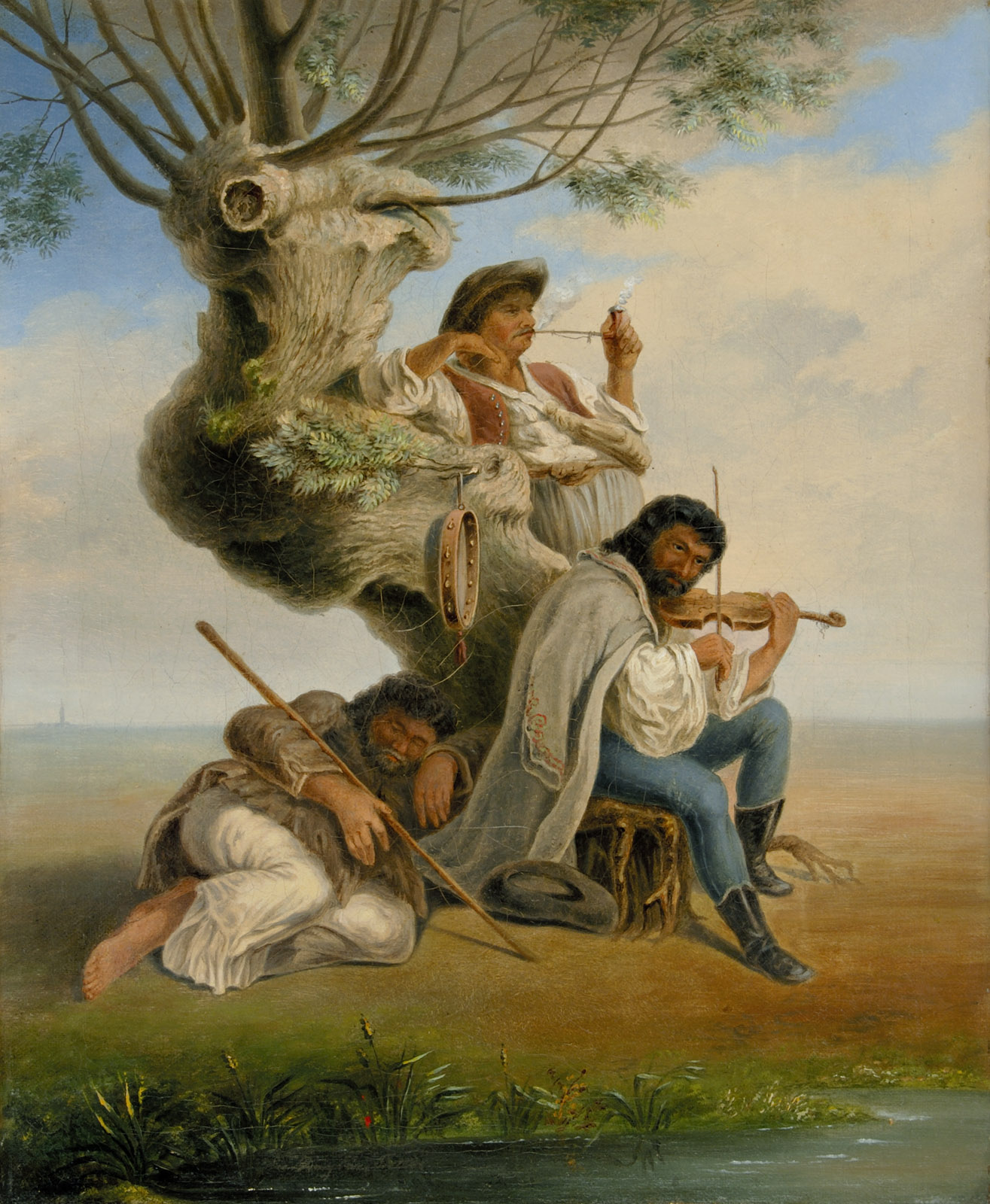
Three Gypsies by Ferencz Pongrácz, 1836

Muslim Roma settled in Baranya and the City Pécs at the Ottoman Hungary. After the Siege of Pécs when the Habsburgs took it back, Muslim Roma and other Muslims were converted to the Catholic faith in the years 1686 -1713. Interestingly, the Ghagar, a subgroup of the Doms in Egypt, have an oral history that some of them once went to Hungary.

In the mid-18th century, Empress Maria Theresa (1740–1780) and Emperor Joseph II (1780–1790) dealt with the Romani question by the contradictory methods of enlightened absolutism. Maria Theresa enacted a decree prohibiting the use of the name "Cigány" (Hungarian) or "Zigeuner" (German) ("Gypsy") and requiring the terms "new peasant" and "new Hungarian" to be used instead. She later placed restrictions on Romani marriages and ordered children to be taken away from Romani parents to be raised in "bourgeois or peasant" families. This was combined with decrees that prohibited the nomadic lifestyle that a large part of the Roma population had followed.

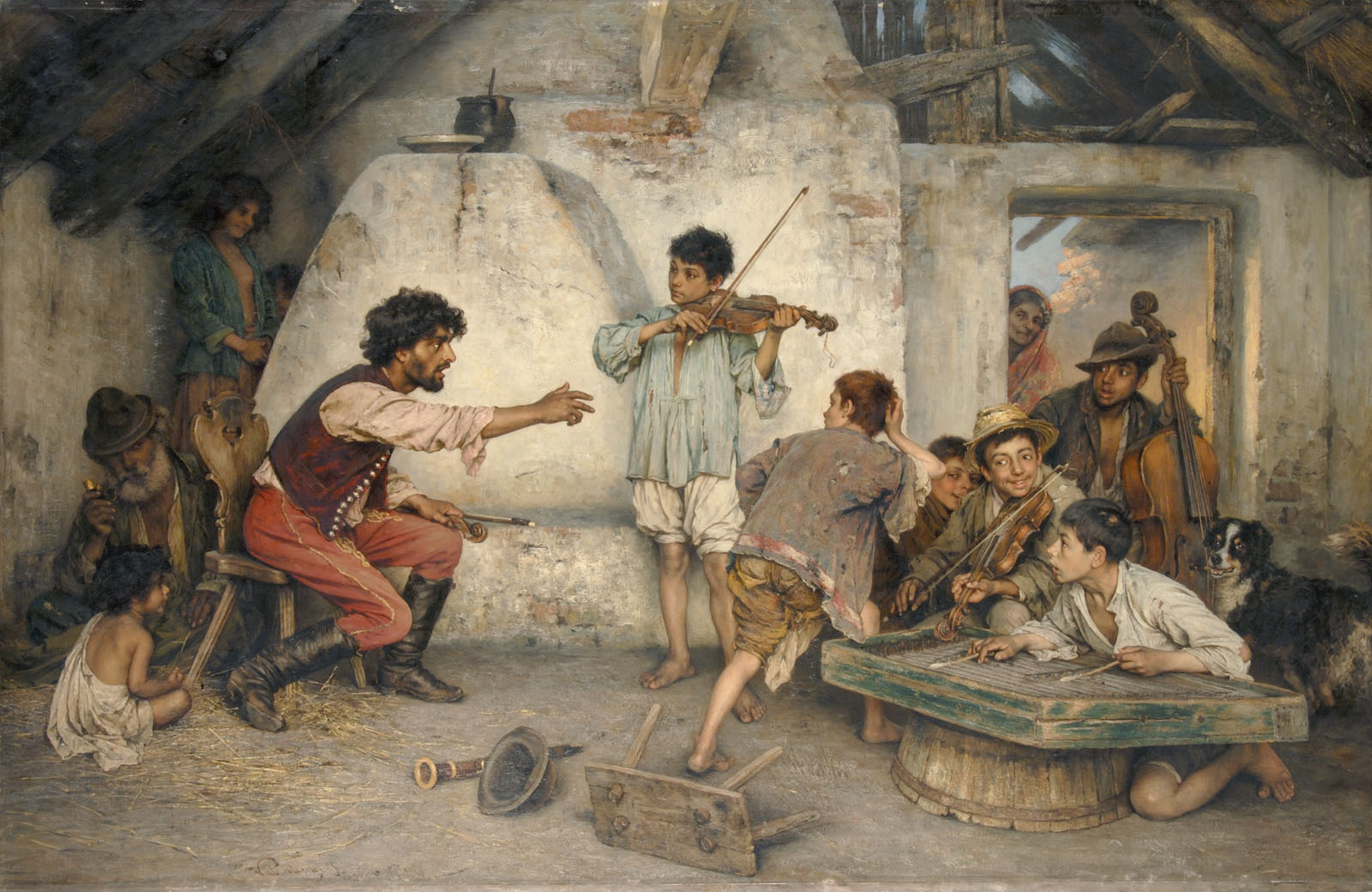
Romani people in Hungary, painted by János Valentiny

=== 20th century ===
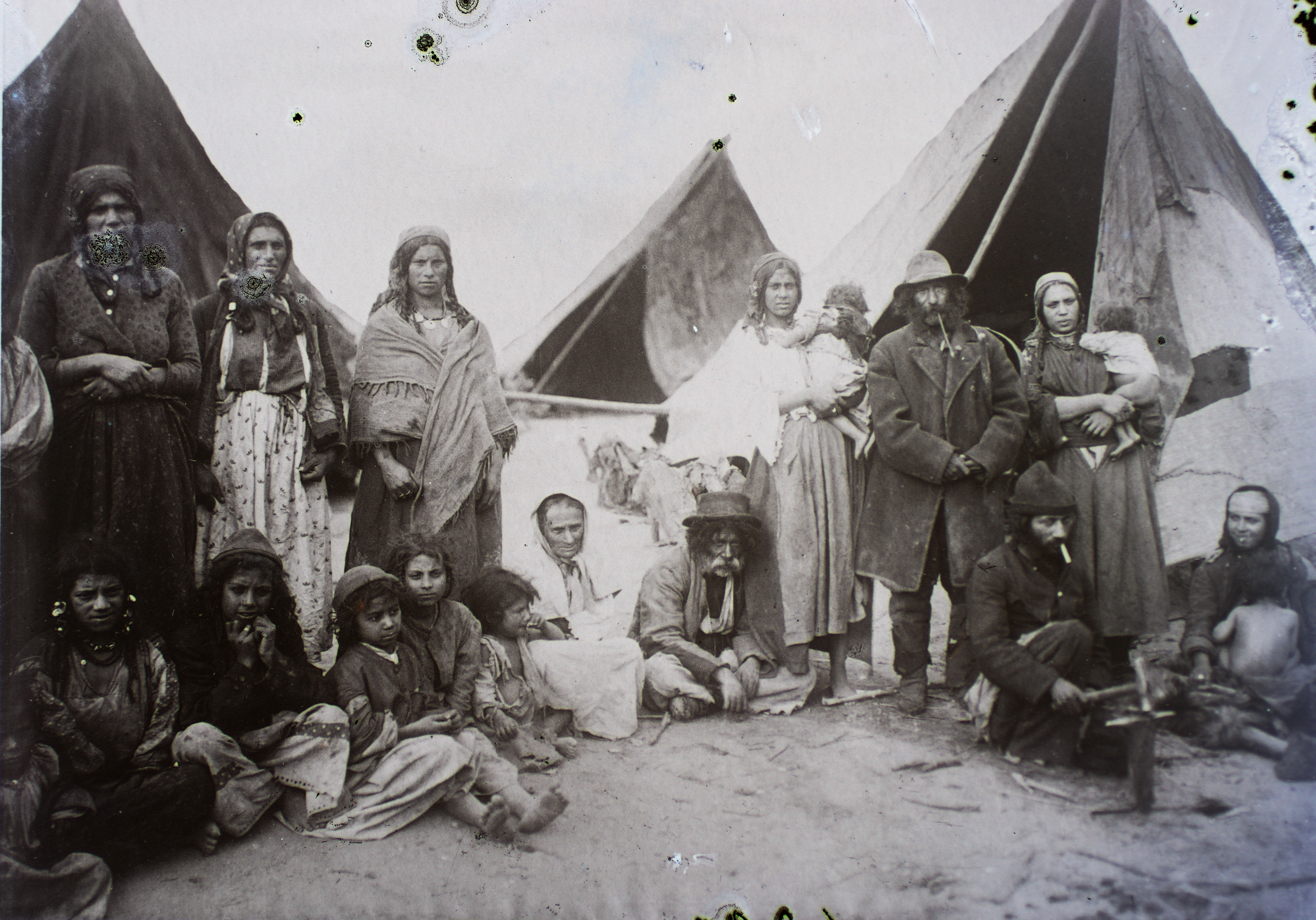
Romani people in Cegléd, Hungary, 1908

Following Hungarian independence in 1919, the Hungarian government carried out a series of anti-Roma policies. The Roma were prohibited by bureaucratic obstacles from practicing their traditional trades, and annual police raids on Roma communities were mandated by legislation. During World War II, 28,000 Hungarian Romani were murdered by the Nazis, who worked in conjunction with the Hungarian authorities led by Ferenc Szálasi of the Arrow Cross Party.

Following the establishment of the post-war administration, formal discrimination against the Roma was removed and conditions improved for the Roma population. However, they were still economically disadvantaged and did not benefit from the post-war land reform to the same degree as ethnic Hungarians.

During the 1956 Hungarian Revolution, several thousand Hungarian Roma took part in the uprising, estimated as around 5–8% of revolutionary forces. Among notable Romani figures of the Revolution was Dilinkó Gábor, who fought in the Battle of the Corvin Passage and later on became an artist.

The 1960s and 1970s saw a process of integration of the Roma into Hungarian society, with many Roma becoming more urbanised and leaving their traditional occupations to take industrial jobs. This formed part of a deliberate attempt to integrate the Roma into Hungarian society, by removing the economic and cultural particularities that differentiated them from the majority population. Despite this policy, the Roma still had lower incomes than non-Roma, which was believed to be connected to larger family sizes and their more rural residence pattern. Some Roma continued to participate in the non-state economy, especially music, crafts, horse-trading and commerce, their fortunes rising and falling throughout the Communist era depending on the degree of economic autonomy permitted by the regime. After the fall of Communism, Hungarian Roma suffered disproportionately from the country's economic collapse, with high unemployment rates accompanied by an increase in anti-Roma racist sentiment.

== Demographics ==
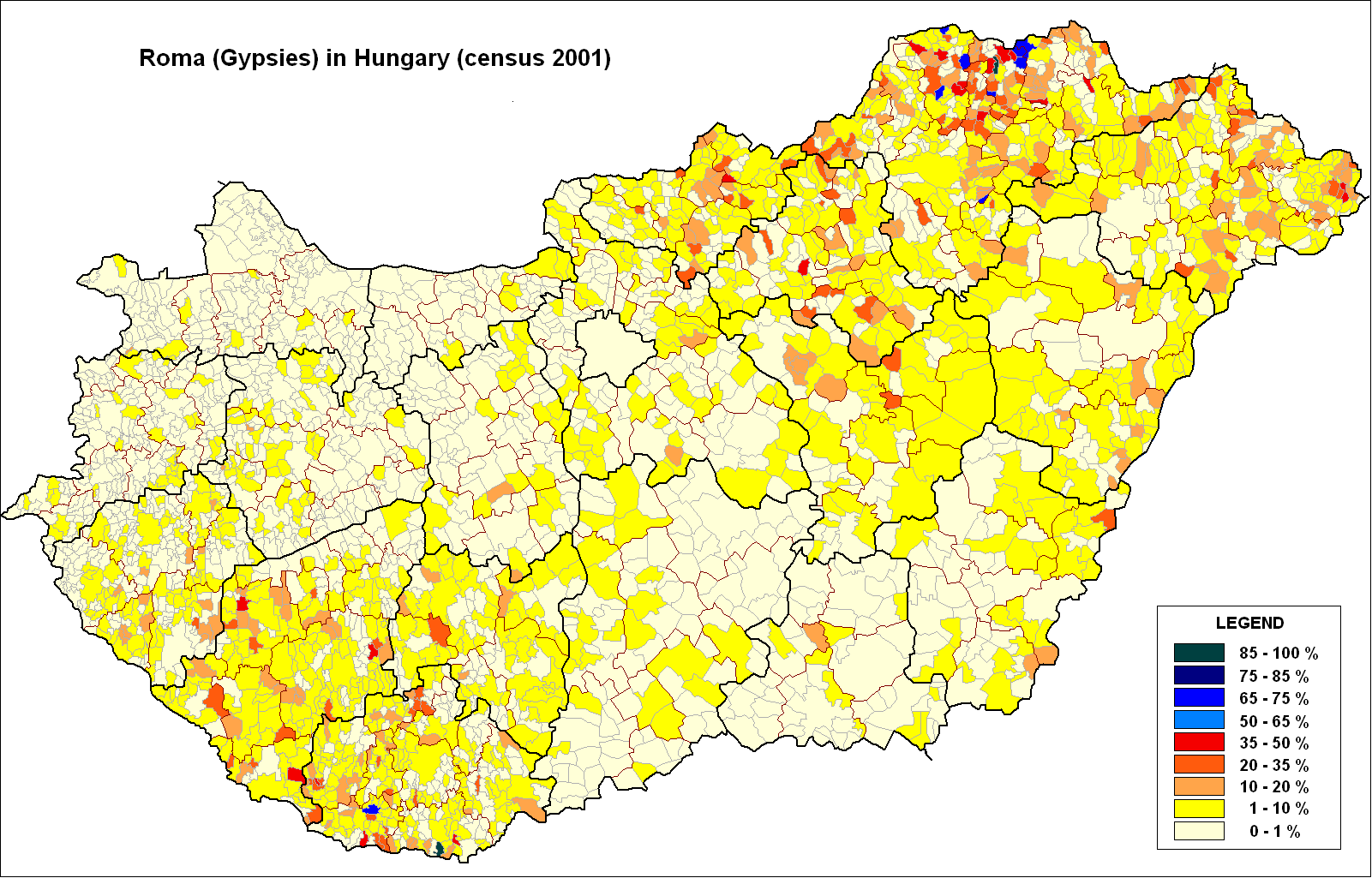
Romani minority in Hungary (2001 census), by locality

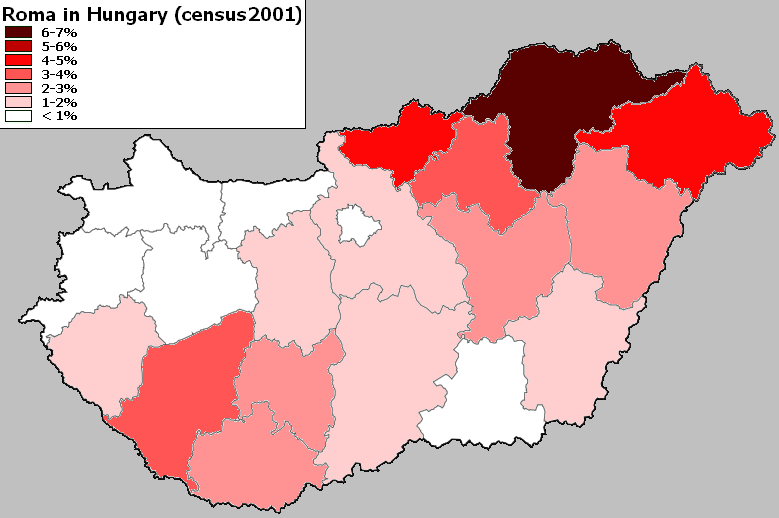
Romani minority in Hungary (2001 census), by county

Current demographic changes in Hungary are characterised by an aging, falling population while the number of people of Romani origin is rising and the age composition of the Romani population is much younger than that of the overall population. Counties with the highest concentration of Romani are Borsod-Abaúj-Zemplén and Szabolcs-Szatmár-Bereg (officially 45,525 and 25,612 people in 2001, respectively), but there are other regions with a traditionally high Romani population like parts of Baranya and the middle reaches of the Tisza valley.

Although they traditionally lived in the countryside, under general urbanization trends from the second half of the 20th century many of them moved into the cities. There is a sizable Romani minority living in Budapest (officially 12,273 people in 2001). The real number of Romani in Hungary is a disputed question. In the 2001 census 205,720 people called themselves Romani, but experts and Romani organisations estimate that there are between 450,000 and 1,000,000 Romani living in Hungary.

Studies from the 1990s show that the majority of Romani in Hungary grow up with Hungarian as their mother tongue. Only about 5% spoke Romani and another 5% spoke Boyash as their mother tongue, with particularly Romani rapidly declining. Boyash is a language related to Romanian and apart from loan words not related to Romani.

During World War II, about 28,000 Romani were killed by the Nazis in Hungary. Since then, the size of the Romani population has increased rapidly. Today every fifth or sixth newborn Hungarian child belongs to the Romani minority. Based on current demographic trends, a 2006 estimate by Central European Management Intelligence claims that the proportion of the Romani population will double by 2050.

Census data
County	Romani population (2011 census)	%
Borsod-Abaúj-Zemplén	58,376	8.51%
Szabolcs-Szatmár-Bereg	44,738	8.00%
Nógrád	15,489	7.65%
Heves	19,467	6.30%
Somogy	16,794	5.31%
Jász-Nagykun-Szolnok	19,089	4.94%
Baranya	17,585	4.55%
Tolna	9,072	3.94%
Hajdú-Bihar	18,546	3.39%
Békés	9,541	2.65%
Zala	7,283	2.58%
Bács-Kiskun	11,327	2.18%
Pest	20,719	1.70%
Fejér	6,497	1.53%
Veszprém	5,336	1.51%
Komárom-Esztergom	4,371	1.44%
Csongrád-Csanád	5,006	1.20%
Budapest	20,151	1.17%
Vas	2,685	1.05%
Győr-Moson-Sopron	3,511	0.78%
Total	315,583	3.18 %

Estimated proportion of Roma primary school students
County	Villages	Cities except the county seat	County seat	Total
Bács-Kiskun	10.19%	13.51%	6.56%	11.09%
Baranya	34.08%	15.64%	8.81%	17.58%
Békés	13.32%	12.08%	2.74%	10.49%
Borsod-Abaúj-Zemplén	53.36%	31.05%	14.48%	36.39%
Budapest	–	–	–	5.70%
Csongrád-Csanád	4.98%	5.37%	3.57%	4.49%
Fejér	9.07%	7.29%	2.44%	6.55%
Győr-Moson-Sopron	4.72%	2.18%	3.26%	3.35%
Hajdú-Bihar	33.42%	22.65%	2.42%	18.09%
Heves	32.95%	19.96%	7.47%	23.00%
Jász-Nagykun-Szolnok	35.54%	18.53%	8.09%	20.83%
Komárom-Esztergom	4.74%	9.11%	11.39%	8.30%
Nógrád	44.21%	20.80%	25.71%	33.83%
Pest	11.52%	6.87%	–*	8.16%
Somogy	34.90%	15.29%	8.43%	20.57%
Szabolcs-Szatmár-Bereg	47.08%	27.50%	6.63%	31.70%
Tolna	27.12%	11.35%	6.70%	16.08%
Vas	5.23%	5.99%	1.43%	4.06%
Veszprém	10.13%	8.04%	2.95%	7.72%
Zala	23.07%	7.40%	3.88%	11.85%
Total	26.08%	13.67%	6.21%	14.42%

* The seat of Pest County is Budapest, but Budapest is not part of Pest County. For the county seat data in Pest County, see above, under the Budapest data.

== Culture ==
=== Music ===
The artistry of Hungarian Roma, particularly in music, has become intricately linked with the cultural fabric of the country. Influential Hungarian composer Franz Liszt controversially contended that their music formed the core of what was perceived globally as Hungarian music.

Hip-hop is also popular among Hungarian Roma.

=== Cuisine ===
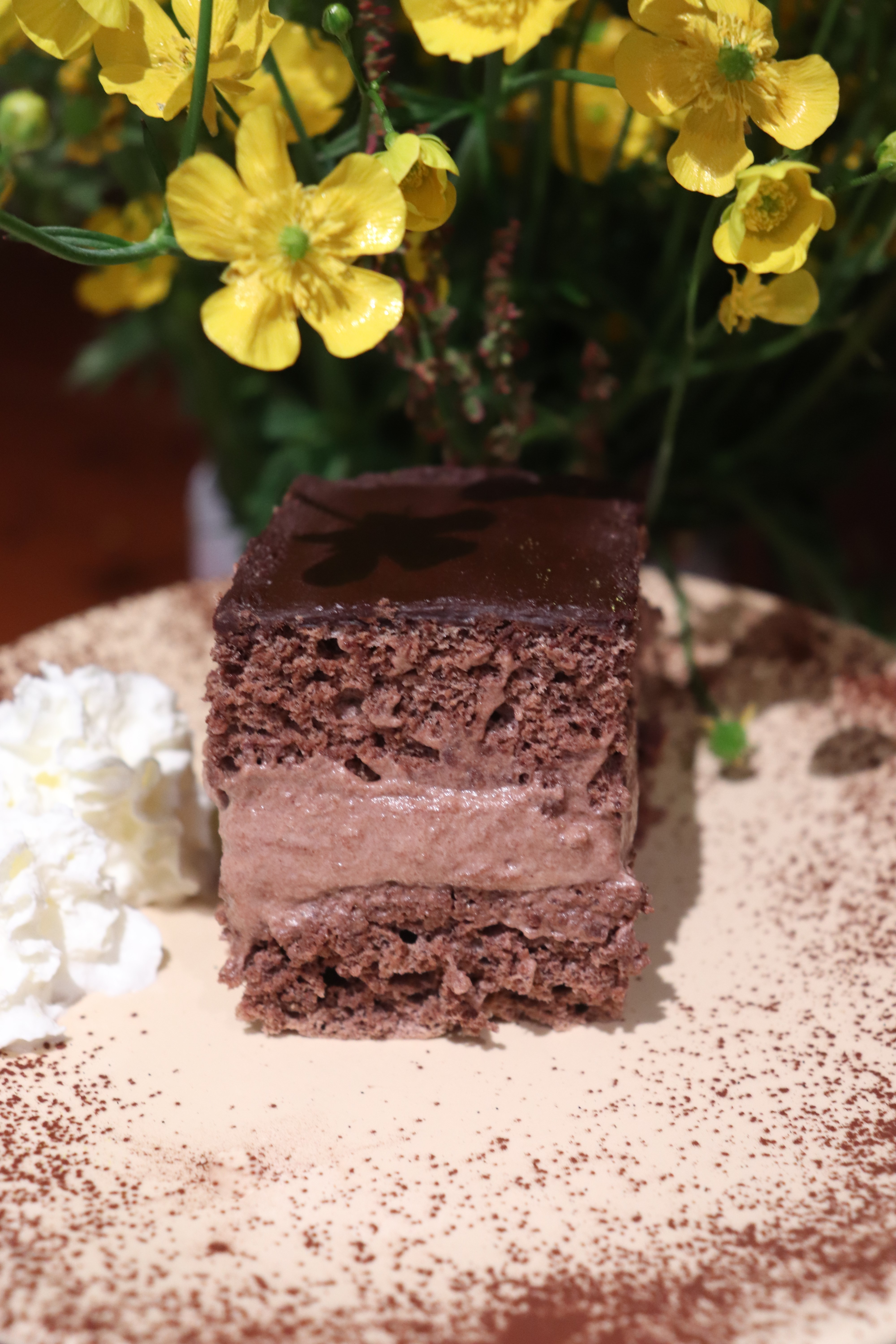
Rigójancsi

Bodag is a type of Romani flatbread frequently accompanied by stuffed cabbage and lecsó. In addition to lecsó, bodag is among the most recognized Romani dishes in Hungary. In certain regions, it is referred to as vakáro, vakarcs, or gypsy bread. Bodag shares similarities with Indian naan, Latin American tortilla and Turkish pita. A very basic version exists, consisting solely of flour, salt, baking soda, and water. While bodag can be seasoned, it is typically eaten alongside stews and other succulent dishes. Another popular Hungarian Romani dish is kakaspörkölt. Goulash is also popular among Hungarian Roma. Romani Platni is a Roma restaurant in Budapest. Rigójancsi is a chocolate cake named after the famous Hungarian Roma violinist.

== Discrimination, racism and social exclusion ==
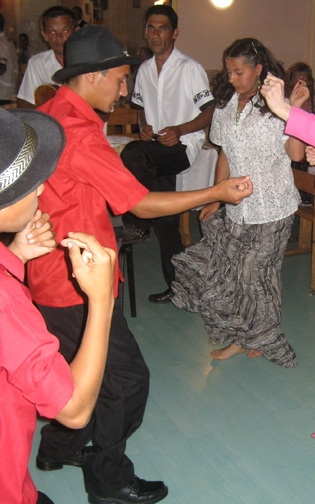
Young Hungarian Romani dancing

Though Roma have lived in Hungary for centuries, there is continued racism, discrimination and social exclusion related to the Romani minority in Hungary, and the very subject of the Roma is a controversial topic in the country. The marginalization of the Roma has increased since the fall of Communism, with anti-Roma discrimination worsening since 2011 due to the rightward shift of Hungarian politics.

=== Education ===
Whereas almost half of Hungarian secondary school students enroll in vocational secondary schools or comprehensive grammar schools, which provide better opportunities, only one in five Romani children does. Moreover, the drop-out rate in secondary schools is significant. Slightly more than 80% of Romani children complete primary education, but only one-third continue studies into the intermediate (secondary) level. This is far lower than the more than 90% of children of non-Romani families who continue studies at an intermediate level. Less than 1% of Romani hold higher educational certificates. In a strategic case covering twenty-eight schools, the courts found that educational authorities had failed to act against the segregation of Roma pupils, violating equal treatment laws. Several similar cases have been documented across Hungary, with multiple courts ruling that schools and authorities violated equal treatment laws by creating or maintaining segregation.

The separation of Romani children into segregated schools and classes is also a problem, and has been on the rise over the past 15 years.

Segregated schools are partly the result of "white flight", with non-Romani parents sending their children to schools in neighbouring villages or towns when there are many Romani students in the local school, but Romani children are also frequently placed in segregated classes even within "mixed" schools. In 2016, the European Commission launched infringement proceedings against Hungary for its segregation of Romani children, this followed six incidences in which the Supreme Court of Hungary ruled that school districts had enforced segregation in schools. That year, according to Amnesty International, 45% of Roma children attended segregated schools.

In 2020, the Hungarian Supreme Court ruled that Roma children in the town of Gyöngyöspata had suffered from the illegal segregation of their school, in which ethnic Roma were taught on the ground floor and non-Roma were taught on the first floor.

In 2023, the European Court of Human Rights issued a judgment against Hungary for the racial segregation of Roma pupils at the Jókai Mór Primary School in Piliscsaba. The court urged Hungary to "develop a policy against segregation in education and take steps to eliminate it".

Many other Romani children are sent to classes for pupils with learning disabilities. The percentage of Romani children in special schools rose from about 25% in 1975 to 42% in 1992, with a 1997 survey showing little change; however, a National Institute for Public Education report says that "most experts agree that a good number of Roma children attending special schools are not even slightly mentally disabled".

=== Economic exclusion ===
In the transition to a market economy, Roma workers were disproportionately likely to lose their jobs, leading to severe economic hardship and social exclusion. The Roma population of Hungary still suffer from an elevated rate of poverty which can only be partly explained by their larger family sizes. The unemployment rate for Roma in 2012 was at least 70%, three to four times that of non-Roma. The Helsinki Committee for Human Rights on Hungary has reported that Roma do not receive equal treatment in employment, while the UN Special Rapporteur on Racism states that, according to NGO's, the high level of unemployment among Roma is the result of frequent discrimination in the labour market. More than 40% of Roma interviewed in 2012 stated they had suffered racial discrimination, and it is common for Roma who are invited for interview to be told the position has been filled when their ethnicity becomes apparent. Chinese merchants in Hungary often hire Romani women to do work since they do not require high pay. No taxes or social security are present in these arrangements.

The housing conditions of Hungarian Roma are considerably worse than those of non-Roma across a range of indicators of deprivation. Hungarian Roma frequently live in segregated districts of small, isolated villages that lack basic services. NGOs, academics and religious organisations working with the Roma report that they are often denied access to public housing, and where government programmes to improve their living conditions exist, they can be impeded by local authorities.

=== Violence against Roma ===
Racially-motivated violence against Roma by members of the majority population became increasingly common in the early 1990s, initially associated with far-right Skinhead gangs. The racial component of these attacks was frequently minimised or denied by the police and courts. The increase in anti-Roma sentiment in the 21st century, alongside an increase in antisemitism, xenophobia and electoral success for the far-right, led to another increase in anti-Roma violence. Between July 2008 and August 2009, six Romani were killed and 55 injured in a string of racially motivated attacks in several rural Hungarian villages. A group of four neo-Nazi men accused of committing the murders went on trial in 2011. All were found guilty in 2013 and three of them were given life sentences. The trial was the subject of a film released internationally in 2014 called Judgment in Hungary.

Following this increase in violence against the Roma in Hungary, the Office for Democratic Institutions and Human Rights of the Organization for Security and Co-operation in Europe reported that the Roma were susceptible to becoming "scapegoats" for the economic problems that followed the crisis of 2008. Amnesty International reported that in addition to these lethal attacks, there were numerous others which did not receive publicity, and added that hate crimes were frequently not classified as such by the police.

On 22 April 2011, a vigilante group called Véderő organized a training camp in the town of Gyöngyöspata. This created fear in the local Romani residents, and Aladár Horváth, leader of the Roma Civil Rights Movement, called on the Red Cross to evacuate the women and children. The Red Cross denied that it was an evacuation, stating the trip was requested by the Romani community for the Easter holidays. The camp was eventually dismantled on 22 April, and the members of Véderő left the area. Four days later, some of the members returned to Gyöngyöspata, resulting in a fight between the local Romani and the Véderő that left four people injured.

On 5 August 2012, an anti-Roma political demonstration organised by the Jobbik party took place in the town of Devecser, which led to violence against the property of the town's Roma population. The marchers chanted "Gypsy criminality", "Gypsies you will die" and "We will burn your houses down and you will die inside", while the police took no action to stop them. From the podium, calls were made for a "final solution to the Gypsy problem". In 2017, the European Court of Human Rights found the Hungary's government had acted illegally by failing to protect the Roma population from threats of violence and intimidation, and that this failure may have given the impression that such threats were sanctioned by the state. The government was forced to pay damages to the Roma victims.

=== Anti-Roma attitudes and discrimination ===
Anti-Roma attitudes and discrimination have existed continuously in Hungary since the dissolution of the Austro-Hungarian empire, and these views have often been mirrored or encouraged by anti-Roma policies and rhetoric from political parties and governments. A 2019 Pew Research poll found that 61% of Hungarians held unfavorable views of Roma. According to the Society for Threatened Peoples, the Roma are "consciously despised by the majority population," while anti-Roma attitudes are becoming more open. A range of negative views of Roma are common among the majority population, research in 2011 showed that 60% of Hungarians feel Roma have criminality "in their blood" and 42% supported the right of bars to refuse to allow Roma to enter.

Discrimination against Roma by state agencies is well documented. Roma are segregated in state schools, and suffer discrimination in their dealings with police. In June 2022, the European Roma Rights Centre accused Hungarian Police, along with those of 5 other countries, of discriminatory treatment of Roma. This discrimination consisted of a failure to protect Roma from, and to seriously investigate, racially motivated crime, as well as the targeting and harassment of those communities.

Following the Russian invasion of Ukraine in 2022, Ukrainian Roma refugees in Hungary suffered various incidences of discrimination. Upon attempting to enter the country, Roma were segregated from their non-Roma compatriots and treated as economic migrants.

==== Anti-Roma statements from Hungarian politicians ====
Members of mainstream Hungarian political parties have been accused nationally and internationally of having racist anti-Roma views and positions according to the prevailing standards in the EU. The police chief of Miskolc, Albert Pásztor, who was dismissed from his position and reassigned to another after being accused of making anti-Roma statements, then reinstated following protests, was selected as joint mayoral candidate for the Hungarian Social Democrats and Democratic Coalition in 2014. He declared that certain types of crime were committed exclusively by Roma people and when challenged reiterated his views and claimed they were summarized from the local police reports. As the keeping of ethnic crime statistics contravenes Hungarian law, a representative from the Alliance of Free Democrats enquired as to whether Pásztor had compiled a private archive of crime statistics. Pásztor replied that his statements were not based on statistics, but on mentions of offender ethnicity in reports made by victims of crime.

In 2013, the governing Fidesz party refused to condemn the comments of their leading supporter Zsolt Bayer, who wrote:

"a significant part of the Gypsies is unfit for coexistence... They are not fit to live among people. These Gypsies are animals, and they behave like animals... These animals shouldn't be allowed to exist. In no way. That needs to be solved - immediately and regardless of the method."

Deputy Prime Minister Tibor Navracsics initially strongly criticised the statement, but later defended Bayer, suggesting that Bayer's comments were not his genuine opinion. Fidesz communications chief Máté Kocsis was even more supportive of Bayer, saying critics of Bayer's article were "siding with" Roma murderers, even though nobody had been murdered in the attack to which Bayer had referred. Later Bayer declared his words had been taken out of context and misunderstood, as his goal was to stir up public opinion, he denied racial discrimination and stated that he wished only to segregate from society only those Roma people who were "criminal" and "incapable and unfit for co-existence". The comments led to an advertising boycott of Bayer's Magyar Hírlap newspaper.

In 2013, Géza Jeszenszky, the ambassador to Norway provoked protests in Hungary and Norway due to statements in a textbook which suggested that Roma suffered from mental illness because "in Roma culture it is permitted for sisters and brothers or cousins to marry each other or just to have sexual intercourse with each other." Jeszenszky claimed that these statements, which he said were based on Wikipedia, were not racist, and he received support from the Hungarian foreign ministry. Due to these comments, the Norwegian Institute of Holocaust and Religious Minorities asked Jeszenszky not to attend its International Wallenberg Symposium event.

==== The "Gypsy Crime" narrative ====
A prevailing narrative exists in Hungary which associates Roma with criminality. This narrative is a significant factor in political discourse around the Roma.

In 2006, in the town of Olaszliszka, a schoolteacher was lynched by family members and neighbours of a Roma girl who he had hit with his car, the locals erroneously believing that the girl had been killed or seriously injured in the incident. This crime was utilised by the extreme-right political party Jobbik to introduce anti-Roma discourse into the Hungarian media, characterising the murderers as a "gypsy mob" and demanding a solution to supposed "gypsy crime". According to sociologist Margit Feischmidt, this identification of Romani people with crime, which is not supported by statistical evidence, is fomented by new media accounts linked to the far-right, leading to further racism, discrimination and violence against the Roma. The "Gypsy Crime" narrative serves to present majority ethnic Hungarians as an in-group who are victims of an inherently criminal Roma out-group, serving the racist nationalist narrative of far-right groups. The moral panic around so-called "gypsy crime" has been identified as a contributory factor to the very real racial violence suffered by Hungarian Roma, which police authorities frequently refuse to identify as hate crimes.

== Romani political representation ==
In Hungary, two Romani were elected to parliament as candidates of mainstream parties in 1990, but only one in 1994 and none in 1998. after the 2010 parliamentary election, there were four Romani representatives in the National Assembly.

Between 2004 and 2009, Viktória Mohácsi, a Hungarian politician of Romani ethnicity, was a Member of the European Parliament, one of only a small caucus of Roma MEPs (another ethnic Romani member is Lívia Járóka). She was a member of the Alliance of Free Democrats (SZDSZ), part of the European Liberal Democrat and Reform Party. In 2008, Mohácsi began to receive death threats after highlighting the case of a Roma man and child who were murdered by neo-nazis and inadequacies in the subsequent police investigation. She fled to Canada where she has since been granted political asylum.

Following the 2009 election, Lívia Járóka, a member of the Fidesz, is the only Romani representative in the European Parliament.

=== Political parties ===
Hungarian Romani are represented by a number of conventional political parties and organizations, including the Roma Social Coalition (an organization consisting of 19 Romani organizations), the Independent Interest Association of Roma in Hungary (a new coalition, including the Lungo Drom, the Phralipe Independent Roma organization, and the Democratic Federation of Roma in Hungary) and others. The most recent addition is the Democratic Roma Coalition, established in December 2002 by three Romani organizations in time for the 2003 local elections.

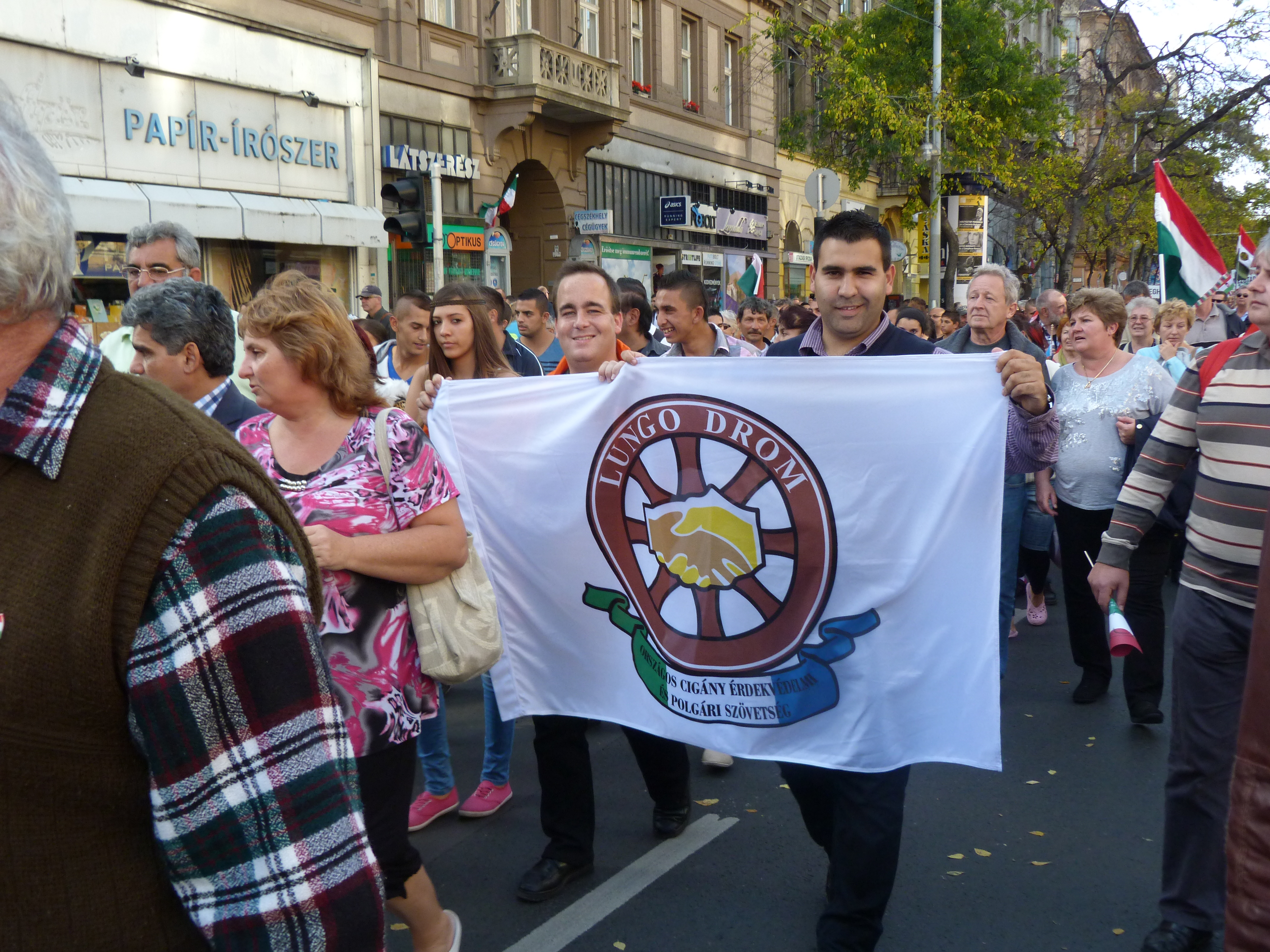
Lungo Drom demonstrating on the anniversary of the 1956 revolution – 2013

=== Act LXXIX of 1993 ===
An important legal regulation directly affecting the position of the Romani population in Hungary is Act LXXIX of 1993 on Public Education, which was amended in 1996 and 2003 to provide the national and local minority self-governing bodies with the opportunity of founding and maintaining educational institutions, and which defined the fight against segregation in schools as an objective.

== Notable people ==
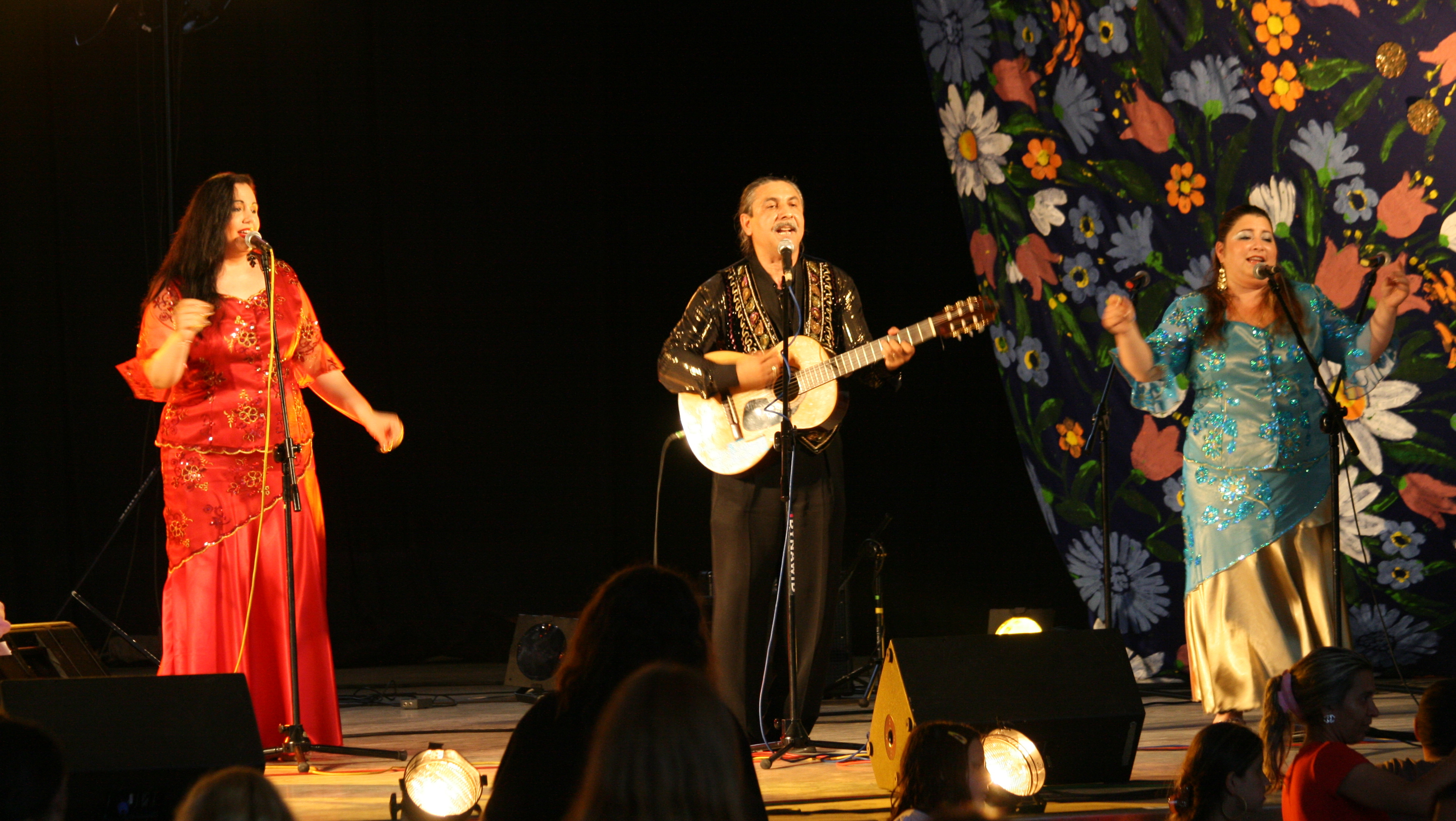
Hungarian Romani music group Kalyi Jag in concert in Warsaw

- Bari Károly
- Attila Balogh
- Norbert Balogh
- Tamás Jónás
- Elek Bacsik
- János Bihari
- Iva Bittová
- Robi Botos
- Caramel
- György Cziffra
- Panna Czinka
- Pista Dankó
- Dávid Daróczi
- Peter Demeter
- Flórián Farkas
- János Farkas
- Lívia Járóka
- Norbert Kalucza
- Orbán Kolompár
- Félix Lajkó (partly)
- Marcia Nicole Lakatos (Barandshay)
- Menyhért Lakatos, writer
- Roby Lakatos
- Viktória Mohácsi
- Mónika Juhász Miczura
- Mary Notar
- Ibolya Oláh
- Joci Pápai
- Aladár Pege
- István Pisont
- Aladár Rácz
- Gigi Radics
- Mariska Veres
- Joci Pápai

== See also ==
- Romani people by country
- Gandhi School (Hungarian: Gandhi Gimnázium)
- Porajmos

== Sources ==
- Achim, Viorel (2004). The Roma in Romanian History. Central European University Press. ISBN 978-963-9241-84-8.
- Crowe, David M. (2007). A History of the Gypsies of Eastern Europe and Russia. PALGRAVE MACMILLAN. ISBN 978-1-4039-8009-0.
- Fraser, Angus (1995). The Gypsies. Blackwell Publishing. ISBN 978-0-631-19605-1.
- Kemény, István (2005). "History of Roma in Hungary" (PDF). In Kemény, István (ed.). Roma of Hungary. Boulder. pp. 1–69. ISBN 978-0-88033-600-0.
- Kiss, Lajos (1983). Földrajzi nevek etimológiai szótára [=Etymological Dictionary of Geographical Names] (in Hungarian). Akadémiai Kiadó. ISBN 978-963-05-3346-1.
- Kristó, Gyula (2003). Nem magyar népek a középkori Magyarországon [=Non-Hungarian Peoples in Medieval Hungary] (in Hungarian). Lucidus Kiadó. ISBN 978-963-9465-15-2.
- Balázs Majtényi, György Majtényi. A Contemporary History ofExclusion: The Roma Issue in Hungary from 1945 to 2015. Budapest, Central European University Press, 2016. 244 pp. $60.00 (cloth),ISBN 978-963-386-122-6.
