= National Roma Self-Government =

Minority self-government in Hungary

National Roma Self-Government in Hungary Magyarországi Romák Országos Önkormányzata
- Minority self-government
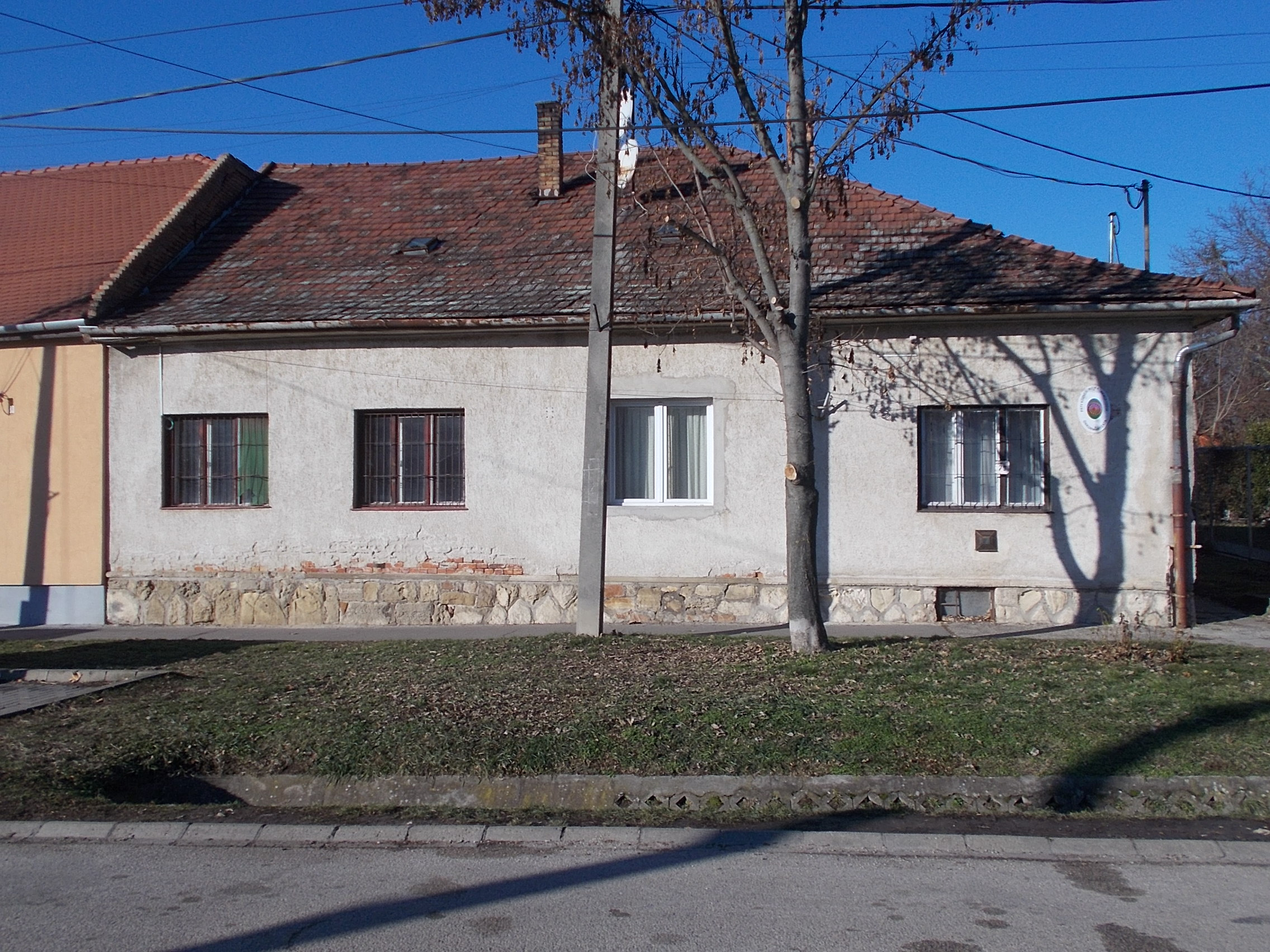
- An office of the ORÖ in Páty

- Flag
- Country: Hungary
- Ethnicity: Romani people
- Minorities Act signed: 1994
- Seat: Dohány utca 76, Budapest

Government
  - President: Mihály Dancs
- National Assembly: 0 / 199
- Website: www.oronk.hu

The National Roma Self-Government in Hungary (Hungarian: Magyarországi Romák Országos Önkormányzata, abbreviated MROÖ), commonly known as simply the National Roma Self-Government (Hungarian: Országos Roma Önkormányzat, abbreviated ORÖ) is a minority self-government in Hungary, representing the Romani people. First established under the 1993 Minorities Act, the ORÖ has gradually grown in size, reaching containing a total of 1,118 local communities in 2006. It has been criticised by Romani rights activists and accused of being a tool of racial segregation of Romani.

== Overview ==
The National Roma Self-Government was established by the 1993 Minorities Act, which provided for the organisation of autonomous minority self-government institutions in order to preserve the cultures of Hungary's ethnic minorities. Romani activists sought to encourage participation in politics among Roma, believing it would prevent cultural assimilation.

The ORÖ also includes a large number of local municipalities, numbering at 1,118 as of 2006. These municipalities have largely been involved in providing economic and social aid to Roma, although they are not permitted to do so under the Minorities Act.

Romani academic Angéla Kóczé, citing Romani rights activist Aladár Horváth, has accused the ORÖ of being utilised by the Hungarian government to engage in racial segregation of Romani people, including the removal of Romani people from mainstream politics and the establishment of state control over Romani political activities and leadership.

=== Politics ===
The ORÖ's politics have been increasingly marked by political polarisation between the right-wing Lungo Drom party (affiliated with Fidesz–KDNP) and the left-wing Romani Alliance Party (associated with the Hungarian Socialist Party), in line with simultaneous polarisation throughout Hungary.

The Hungarian government has interfered in ORÖ elections since 1994, particularly to benefit the Lungo Drom party. This has included providing Lungo Drom with large amounts of state funding relative to other parties and, during the 1994 elections to the ORÖ's presidency and assembly, moving the election to Szolnok (Lungo Drom's headquarters) rather than Budapest, where all other elections for minority self-governments were held. Flórián Farkas, leader of Lungo Drom and former president of the ORÖ, served as a member of the National Assembly for Fidesz from 2002 to 2022. The ORÖ was additionally represented in the National Assembly by Félix Farkas, a Lungo Drom member, from 2014 to 2022. During the 2022 Hungarian parliamentary election, members of the ORÖ not belonging to Lungo Drom attempted to remove Farkas as representative, causing a political crisis in the body over the legitimate representative. As the self-government did not submit a candidate for representative before the legal deadline, the Roma lost their representation in the National Assembly, making it the first time since minority self-governments had been allowed parliamentary representation in 2014 that the Roma did not have representation.

In the 2026 Hungarian parliamentary election ORÖ president István Aba-Horváth resigned in order to run as the ORÖ's representative with the support of Fidesz. He was not successfully elected, and instead became a non-voting member.

== List of presidents ==
- Flórián Farkas (Lungo Drom, 1994–2003)
- Orbán Kolompár (Romani Alliance Party, 2003–2011)
- Flórián Farkas (Lungo Drom, 2011–2014)
- István Hegedüs (Lungo Drom, 2014–2016)
- János Balogh (Romani Alliance Party, 2016–2019)
- Jánocs Agócs (Romani Alliance Party, 2019–2022)
- Oszkár Lakatos (2022–2024)
- István Aba-Horváth (Lungo Drom, 2024–2026)
- Mihály Dancs (Lungo Drom, 2026–present)

== See also ==
- National Self-Government of Germans in Hungary, the minority self-government of ethnic Germans in Hungary
