= Kalyi Jag (group) =

Hungarian Romani folk music group

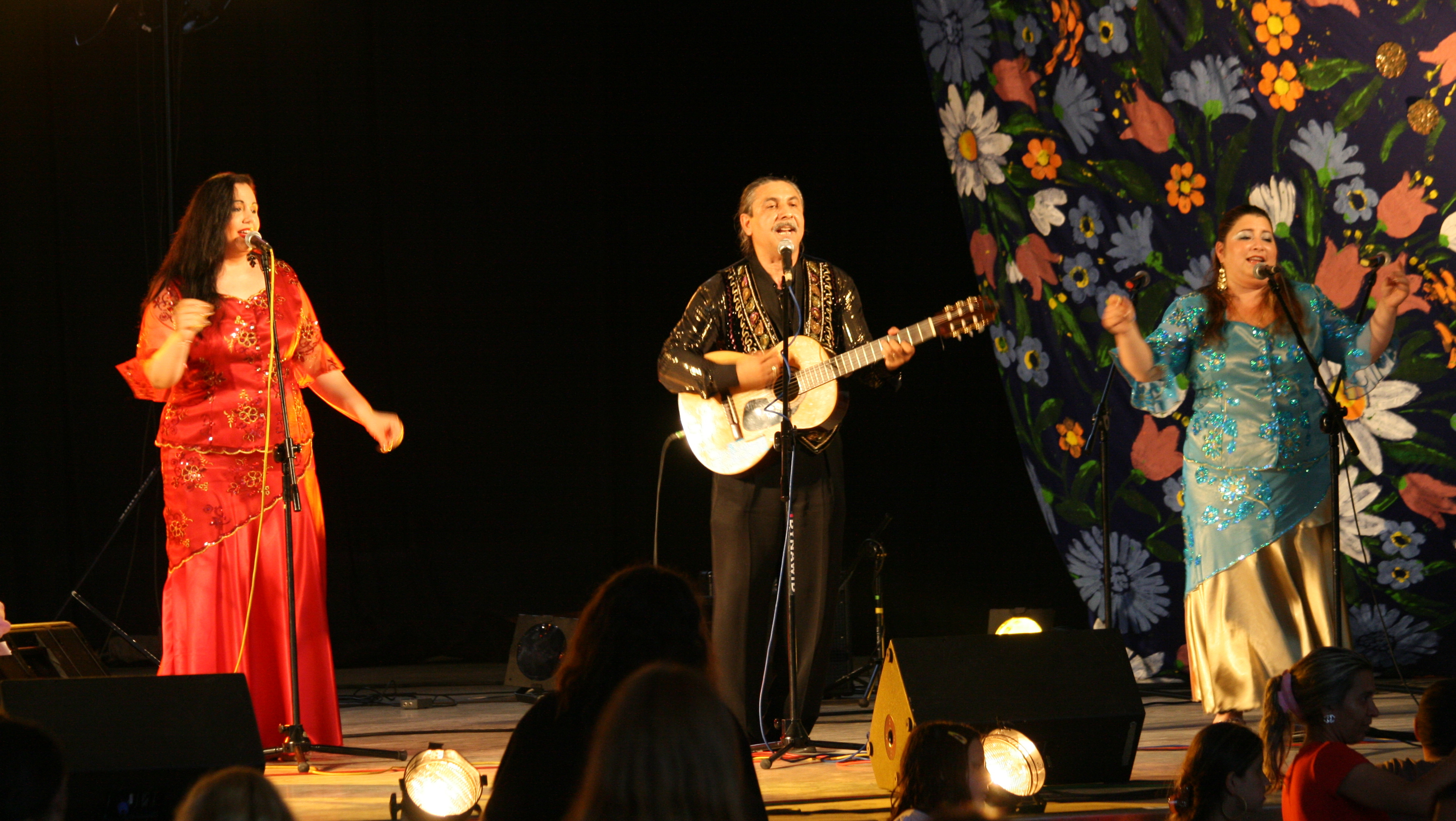
Kalyi Jag performing in Warsaw (Poland) in 2010

Kalyi Jag (Romani for "Black Fire") is a Hungarian Romani folk music group.

The group was founded in Budapest by Vlax Roma members who originated from the Szatmár county. It had roots in the Táncház movement. They were named Young Masters of Folk Art in 1979. The first album was released in 1987 and became a success.

The music is based on traditional Romani music, primarily Vlax Roma music, with some modernization in the interpretations, and the group has included such instruments as the guitar and the mandolin.

Their music style inspired other Romani groups in Hungary. The group is popular in the Roma population in Hungary and neighbouring countries and has held concerts in many European countries.

Early members were

- Gusztáv Varga
- Ágnes Künstler
- József Balogh
- József Nagy
