= Viktória Mohácsi =

Hungarian politician

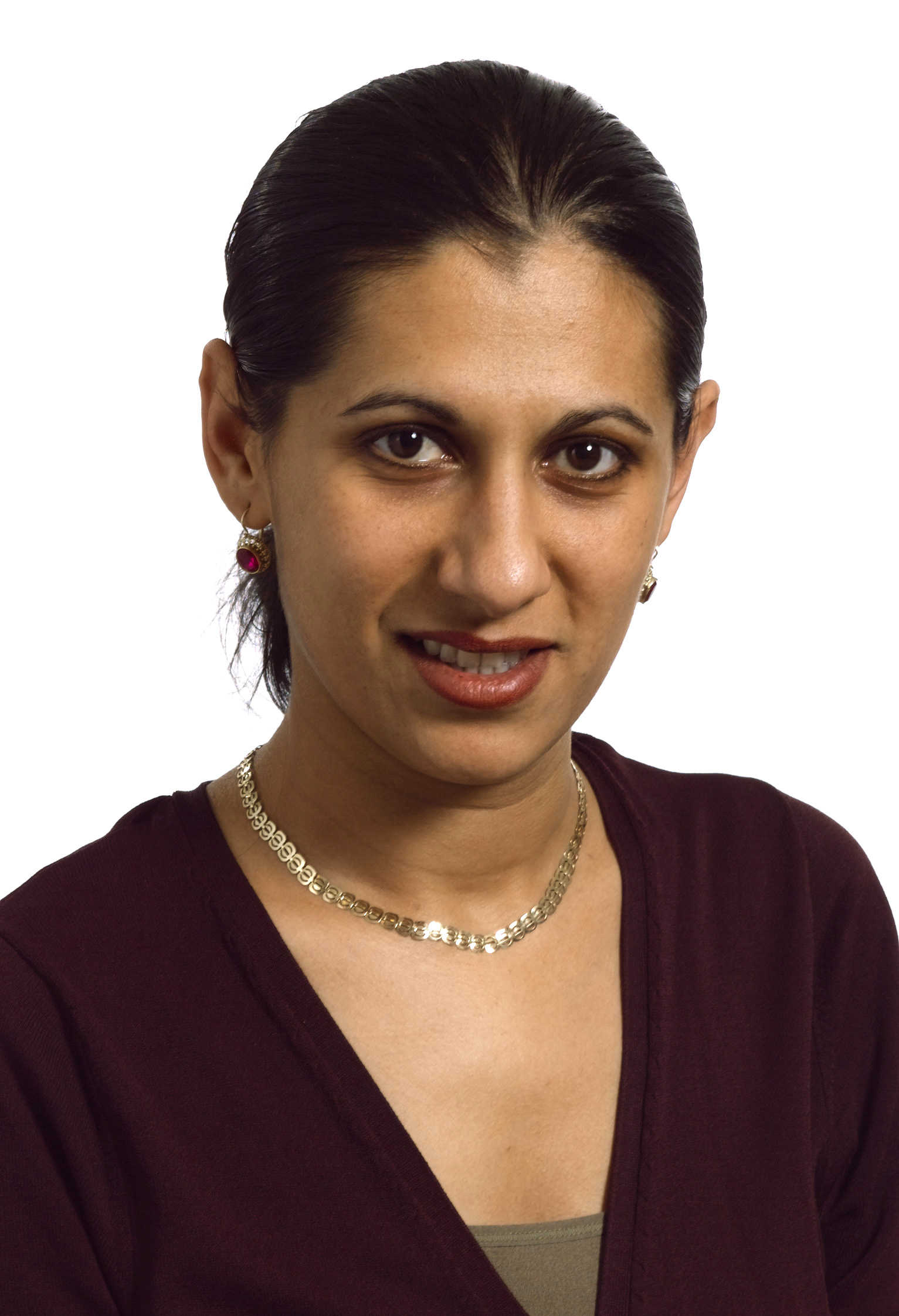
- Mohácsi in 2004

Member of the European Parliament
- In office 1 December 2004 – 14 July 2009
- Preceded by: Gábor Demszky

Personal details
- Born: 1 April 1975 (age 51) Berettyóújfalu, Hungary
- Party: Alliance of Free Democrats

Viktória Mohácsi (born 1 April 1975) is a Hungarian Romani politician. Between 2004 and 2009 she was a Member of the European Parliament (MEP), one of only a small caucus of Roma MEPs. She was a member of the Alliance of Free Democrats, part of the European Liberal Democrat and Reform Party. She replaced a party colleague, Gábor Demszky, on 1 December 2004. She lost her seat in the 2009 European Parliament election.

In 2008 in Rome she was granted the "Premio Minerva" for her activity in defense of human rights of Roma. On 21 October, Mohácsi, who has taken the lead in documenting violence toward the Roma in Hungary, received Human Rights First's 2010 annual award in New York.

The Movement for Desegregation Foundation led by the former European Parliament Member Viktória Mohácsi, the leading domestic monitor of anti-Roma attacks and hate crimes documented 68 attacks, of which 12 lead to death between January 2008 and June 2010. In one of those attacks, in Tatarszentgyorgy, a man and his 5-year-old son were fatally shot as they fled from their burning house. The local police recorded that the man and the child had died from smoke inhalation, but under pressure from Mohácsi the case was reopened leading to the arrest of the neo-Nazi perpetrators. Two police officers were disciplined internally in relation to the incident.

In 2009, Mohácsi requested police protection due to death threats she had received which made reference to her ethnicity. Newspaper Népszabadság reported in February 2012 that the former Member of European Parliament Mohácsi has asked for asylum in Canada. While her request was at first refused in 2017 her appeal was not successful either in 2018, even if several organizations published the opposite. Immigration, Refugees and Citizenship Canada suspended her Pre-Removal Risk Assessment, and granted her application on Humanitarian Grounds on April 26, 2018.
