= Orbán Kolompár =

Hungarian Romani politician

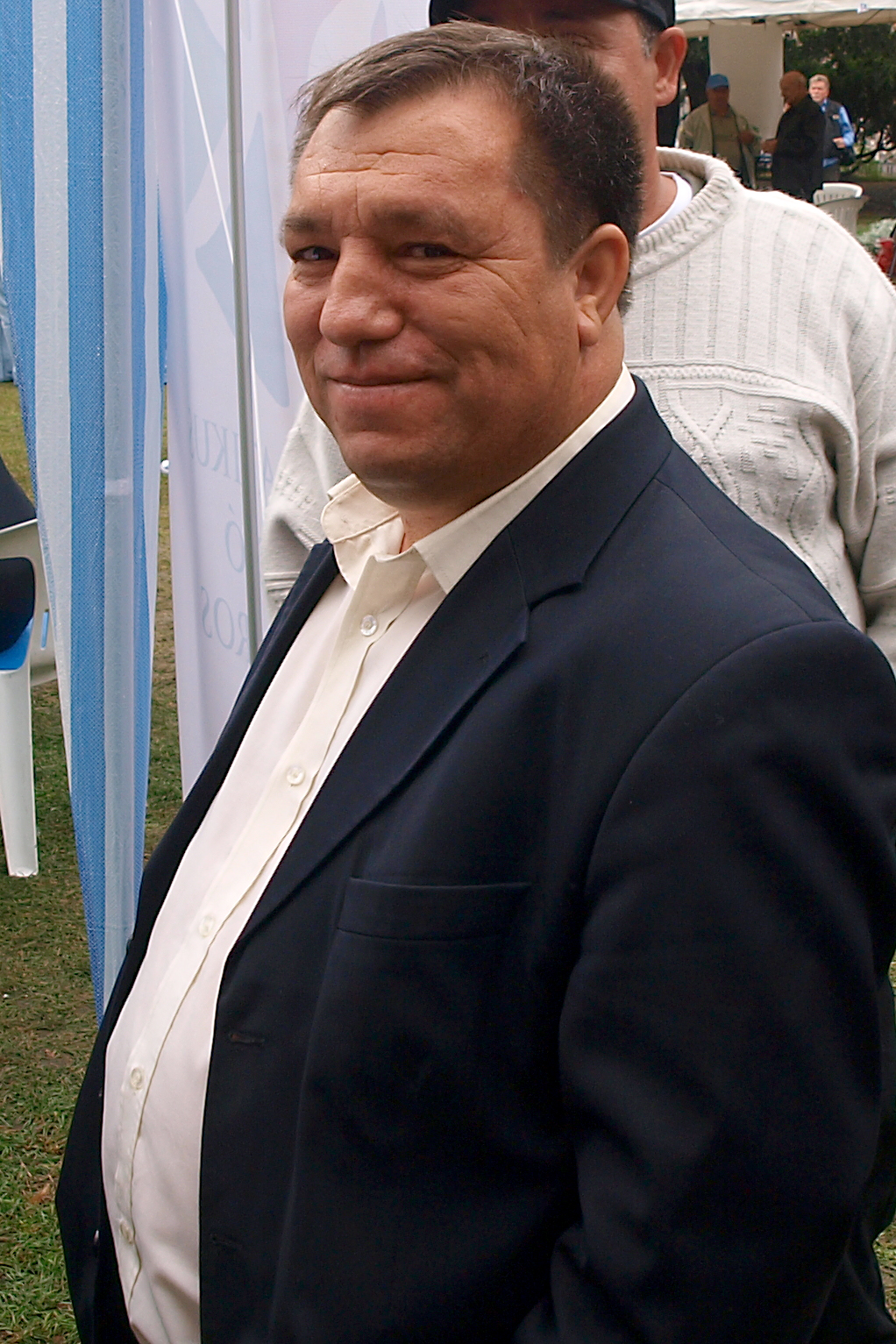

President of the National Roma Self-Government
- In office 2003–2011
- Preceded by: Flórián Farkas
- Succeeded by: Flórián Farkas

Personal details
- Born: 24 September 1963 (age 62) Kiskunmajsa, Hungary
- Party: Romani Alliance Party
- Children: 3

Orbán Kolompár (born 24 September 1963) is a Hungarian Romani politician and activist, who served as President of the National Roma Self-Government from 2003 to 2011. He is the founder and chairman of the Romani Alliance Party (MCF).

== Criminal charge ==
In 2012 Orbán Kolompár was sentenced to 22 months in prison under the charges of abuse of financial position and the violation of European Economic Community financial interests. His fugitive brother, László, was sentenced in absentia to 22 months in prison while his wife got a suspended prison term of a year under the same charges.

Political offices
Preceded by Flórián Farkas	President of the National Roma Self-Government; 2003–2011	Succeeded by Flórián Farkas
