= Aladár Horváth =

Hungarian politician and Romani rights activist (born 1964)

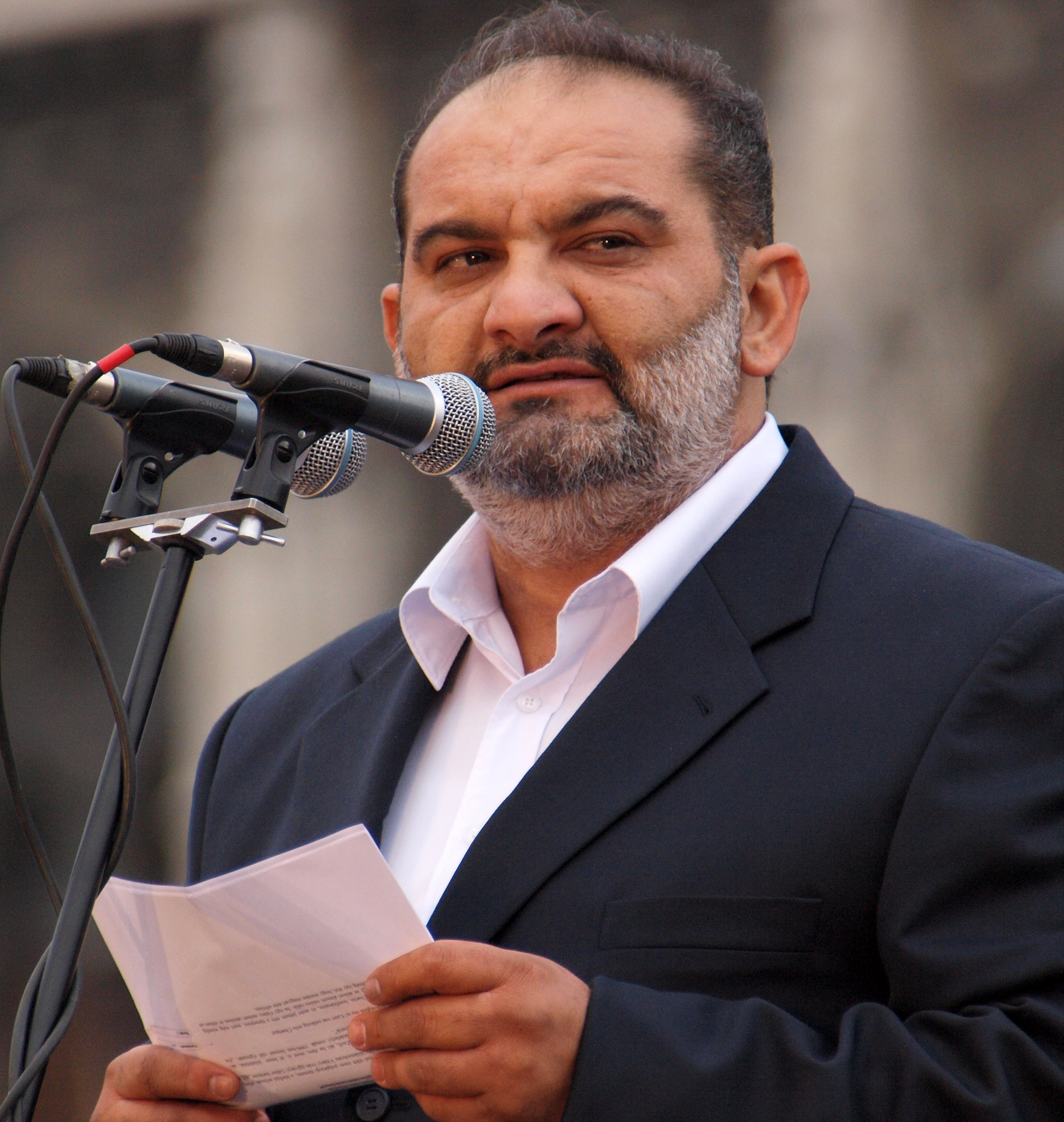
- Horváth in 2008

Member of the National Assembly
- In office 2 May 1990 – 27 June 1994
- Preceded by: Position established

Personal details
- Born: 1964 (age 61–62) Miskolc, Hungary
- Party: Hungarian Gypsy Party (since 2013)
- Other political affiliations: Alliance of Free Democrats (1990–1994); Independent (1994–2013)

Aladár Horváth (born 1964) is a Hungarian politician and Romani rights activist. A member of the National Assembly from 1990 to 1994 from the Alliance of Free Democrats, he was one of the first three Romani members of the National Assembly. He was also president of the Romani Parliament from 1991 to 1994, and has served as its president since 2016. Horváth is one of the leaders of the Romani civil rights movement in Hungary.

== Early life and education ==
Aladár Horváth was born in 1964 in the city of Miskolc. He graduated from Teacher Training College in Sárospatak in 1987, becoming a teacher.

== Activist and political career ==
Horváth began his career in Romani activism in 1988 amidst the end of communism, founding the Anti-Ghetto Committee in Miskolc. The group led the first successful protests against Romani residential segregation, fighting a government attempt to relocate the Romani population of Miskolc outside of the city. He was also the co-founder of Phralipe, the first independent Romani civil rights group in Hungary. Horváth was classified by the government of the Hungarian People's Republic as a 'radical' for his rejection of Romani integration in favour of emphasising Romani ethnic identity.

Horváth's activism in Miskolc, which had drawn the support of the broader Hungarian opposition, was noticed by the Alliance of Free Democrats (Hungarian: Szabad Demokraták Szövetsége, abbr. SZDSZ). He was elected to the National Assembly in the 1990 Hungarian parliamentary election as a member of the SZDSZ, and became one of the body's first three Romani members, alongside Antonia Hága (also from the SZDSZ) and Tamás Péli (from the Hungarian Socialist Party). Horváth ran in the 1994 and 1998 parliamentary elections as an independent, after refusing to vote for the 1993 Minorities Act, which was supported by the SZDSZ.

Horváth continued to be active in Romani activism throughout the 1990s, being the inaugural president of the umbrella organisation Romani Parliament from 1991 to 1994. He founded a variety of Romani civil rights groups in 1995, including the Roma Civil Rights Foundation, the Roma Press Centre, and the Romaversitas Foundation. He further established the Roma Holocaust Memorial Day in 1996. During the 2008–2009 neo-Nazi murders of Roma, Horváth investigated the murders. He claimed that the motive of the murders had been to start a race war by provoking riots among Romani.

Horváth joined the Hungarian Gypsy Party in 2013. He ran as a member of the party in the 2014 Hungarian parliamentary election, contesting the 6th constituency of Budapest. He was not elected. He again became president of the Romani Parliament in 2016, and continues to hold the position.

Horváth was an opponent of the Orbán system, describing it as "a fascist-like social and economic situation". Romaversitas was described as a threat to national security under Orbán's government, and considered leaving Hungary. Following the 2026 Hungarian parliamentary election, in which Orbán was replaced by Péter Magyar, Horváth was one of 50 signatories of an open letter by Romani leaders urging Magyar to protect Romani civil rights and reduce discrimination.

Horváth is one of the leaders of the Romani civil rights movement in Hungary.
