= Lungo Drom =

Romani political party in Hungary

- Leader: Flórián Farkas
- Founder: Flórián Farkas
- Headquarters: Szolnok
- Ideology: Romani minority interests; Cultural assimilation
- National affiliation: Fidesz–KDNP

Lungo Drom is a Romani political party in Hungary. It is closely connected to the Fidesz–KDNP alliance, and one of the main political parties among the Hungarian Romani community, along with the Romani Alliance Party. In contrast to the Romani Alliance Party, which is traditionally connected to the Hungarian Socialist Party, Lungo Drom is allied with Fidesz.

Lungo Drom formed in autumn 1990 after a group led by Flórián Farkas split from the Democratic Alliance of Hungarian Gypsies, the former Romani branch of the Hungarian Socialist Workers' Party. was first elected to the leadership of the National Roma Self-Government in 1995 after the 1993 passage of the Minorities Act established minority self-governments. As a result of electoral interference by the Horn government, including the provision of 21.43 million Hungarian forints to the party and holding the elections in the party's headquarters of Szolnok (rather than Budapest, where all other minority self-government elections occurred), Lungo Drom won all 53 seats.

Since 2001, Lungo Drom has been a member of the Fidesz–KDNP alliance. It was represented in the National Assembly from 2002 to 2022, when leader Flórián Farkas served as a member of the National Assembly on the Fidesz–KDNP electoral list. Farkas was intended to be succeeded by Félix Farkas (unrelated) in the 2022 Hungarian parliamentary election as the representative of the National Roma Self-Government in the National Assembly, but due to a dispute between the self-government's members regarding the legitimacy of Farkas's candidacy, the body did not meet the deadline for minority candidates to be nominated.
