= Gandhi School =

Gandhi (Mashkarutni Shkola ando Pech)
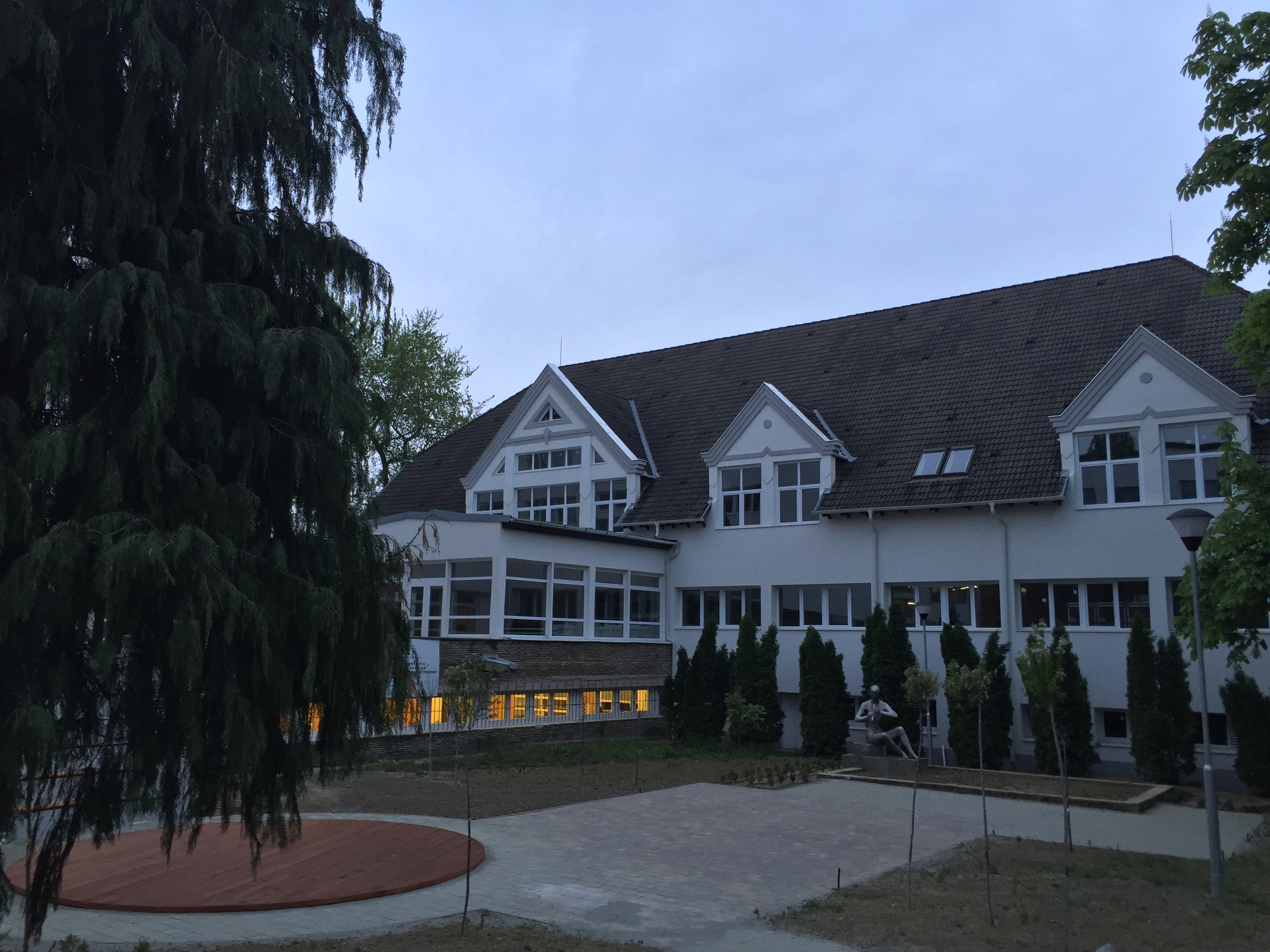

Location
- Pécs; Hungary
- Coordinates: 46°5′33″N 18°16′2″E

Information
- Type: Public school
- Established: 1992
- Gender: co-educational
- Language: Hungarian, Romani
- Campus: Urban
- Colours: Green, Red and Blue
- Accreditation: Ministry of Education of Hungary
- Website: Gandhi School

The Gandhi High School in Pécs, Hungary (in Romani: Gandhi (Mashkarutni Shkola ando Pech)), was founded with donations given by several individuals from the private sector and with further donations from other organizations in 1992, this becoming the first high school for Romani people in Hungary, that has been actively operating since 1994. It was named after the Indian Mahatma Gandhi, to emphasize the Indian origin of all Romani groups. The purpose of the middle school/high school is to provide a school-leaving exam (A-level), also to improve the prospects of Romani children in Hungary and to help preserving the Romani culture.

== See also ==
- Roma in Hungary

== Sources ==
- Information in German
- I Mashkarutni Shkola Gandhi (magyarikanes)
- I librariya (pustakalya)
