= János Valentiny =

Hungarian painter (1842–1902)

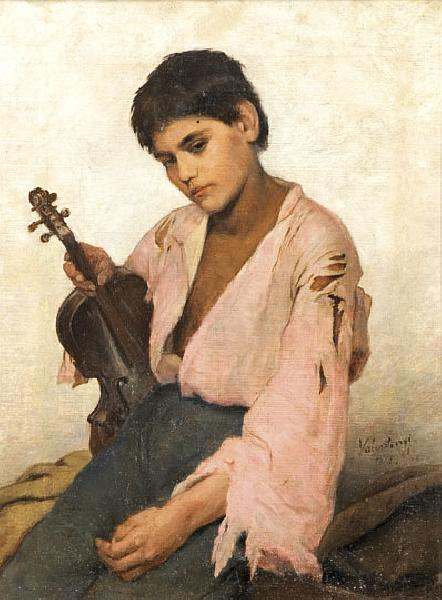
Boy with Violin (1878)

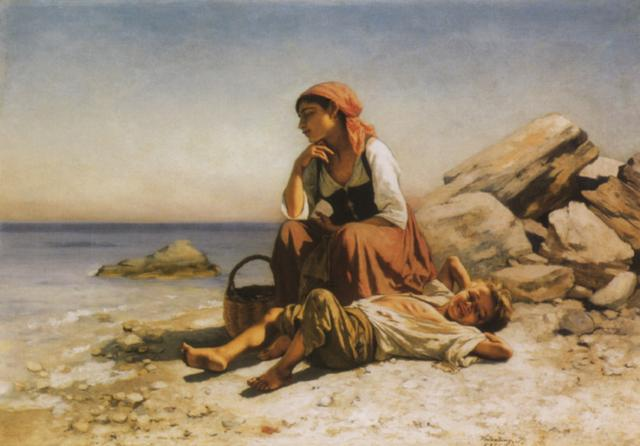
Beach in Italy (1875)

János Valentiny (1 January 1842, Nagylak - 25 February 1902, Nádasdladány) was a Hungarian painter of portraits, landscapes and genre scenes. His international reputation is based on his realistic, unromanticized portrayals of the Hungarian Romani (Gypsies).

== Biography ==
He was sent to Baja for his primary education, and displayed an interest in drawing as a hobby. Soon, he was producing color portraits of his friends and family and saved enough money to move to Pest, where he studied at the First Hungarian Academy of painting under Jakab Marastoni. He attracted the attention of Leó Festetics, who recommended him to Count Leopold Nádasdy as a drawing teacher for the Count's son. He was accepted and moved to Nádasdladány to take up his new position, still aged only seventeen.

With the Count's encouragement, he went to Paris, where he obtained the patronage of Richard von Metternich, the Austro-Hungarian Ambassador, by which means he was able to enroll at the Academy. He stayed in Paris for three years, returning to Nádasdladány in 1868, where he established himself as a painter. After a time, he wanted to return to Paris, but the Commune thwarted his plans. In 1873, he spent a year in Munich, where he found a ready market for his genre scenes.

It was there he first felt the desire to visit Italy. He toured Capri and spent some time in Rome, participating in a few exhibitions. In 1878, he returned to Munich and produced paintings showing his newly acquired Italian influences, but remained only a short time before settling permanently in Nádasdladány. In addition to his canvases, he was commissioned by Count Ferenc Nádasdy (1801-1883), the former Chancellor of Transylvania, to paint an altarpiece depicting Saint Helena in memory of the Count's wife.
