= Flórián Farkas =

Hungarian Romani politician (born 1957)

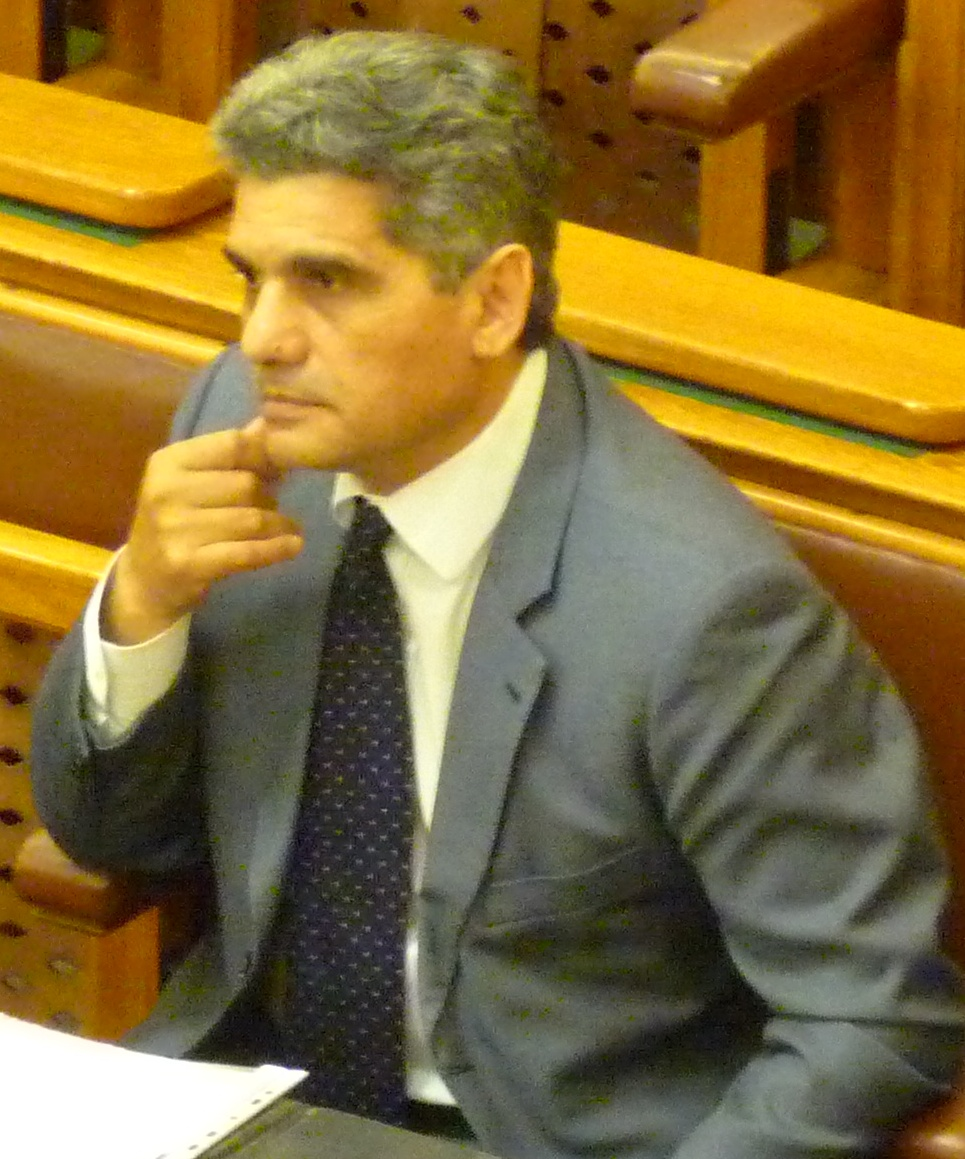
- Farkas in 2015

Member of the National Assembly
- In office 15 May 2002 – 1 May 2022

President of the National Roma Self-Government
- In office 2011–2014
- Preceded by: Orbán Kolompár
- Succeeded by: István Hegedus
- In office 1995–2003
- Preceded by: Position established
- Succeeded by: Orbán Kolompár

Personal details
- Born: 4 September 1957 (age 68) Tiszaroff, Hungary
- Party: Lungo Drom
- Other political affiliations: Fidesz–KDNP
- Spouse: Sarolta Flóriánné Farkas Ámit
- Children: 3

Flórián Farkas (born 4 September 1957) is a Hungarian Romani politician from the Lungo Drom party. He served as president of the National Roma Self-Government from 1995 to 2003 and from 2011 to 2014, as well as a member of the National Assembly from 2002 to 2022.

== Early life and career ==
Farkas was born on 4 September 1957 in Tiszroff. Farkas learned politology at the faculty of the Law at the Eötvös Loránd University between 2001 and 2005. He acquired a university degree in political science there in 2005 and since then he has been a part-time teacher in the university. Farkas has never could provide any evidence of his university degree or at least of his secondary school graduation. However, there are evidences proving the opposite, and the rector of ELTE firmly refuted his activity as a teacher. That's also proven, Farkas was passing the 8-year-long elementary school over 15 years, and he probably finished the 8th class in prison, when he was twenty years old.

== Political career ==
He has taken an active part in Roma public life since 1983. He worked as a social worker for Roma families for the local council of Szolnok and was a member of the Roma Coordination Committee of Jász-Nagykun-Szolnok County from 1985. He became secretary of the National Gypsy Council (OCÖ) in 1987, and secretary general, then president of Lungo Drom Roma Advocacy Alliance.

From 1995 to 2002 he was president of the National Roma Self-Government. On 27 March 2003, he established a new organization, the National Association of Roma Councils by uniting thirty regional Roma organisations as well as nine hundred branches of the Lungo Drom. He was elected chairman of the federal board of the organization. He was among the signatories of the electoral agreement of 21 December 2001 concluded by the Fidesz, the Hungarian Democratic Forum (MDF) and Lungo Drom National Roma Advocacy and Civil Alliance. The cooperation agreement was aimed at the promotion of the social integration of the Roma population and the preservation of the achievements of the Roma policy encouraging the parliamentary representation of the Roma.

In 1996, a prosecution investigation was launched into the foundations set up by Lungo Drom. As a result, Farkas was charged in 1998 with "embezzlement and breach of accounting discipline." However, he received a presidential pardon from Árpád Göncz, therefore the court hearing was suspended. The records of the pardon proceedings were encrypted for 30 years.

=== Member of Parliament ===
He secured a seat in the Parliament in the 2002 general elections as a candidate on the Fidesz national list. Since May he has been participating in the work of the Committee on Human Rights, Minority and Religion as well as the Committee on European Integration. He held the post of deputy parliamentary group leader of Fidesz from 15 May 2002 to 1 November 2015. He was elected member of the Szolnok Assembly in the local elections in the autumn of 2002. He was elected MP from the national list in the 2006 elections.

Four years later he became MP from the Budapest Regional List. He was appointed Ministerial Commissioner for the Romani Affairs by Minister of Justice Tibor Navracsics on 1 July 2010. The Lungo Drom won the Hungarian minority elections of 2011, as a result he was elected president of the National Gypsy Council for the second term, following Orbán Kolompár. In February 2011, the OCÖ adopted a new statute and renamed to National Roma Council (ORÖ). Farkas was re-elected MP via the national list of Fidesz in the 2014 parliamentary election. He worked in the Committee on European Affairs from May 2014 to September 2016. Following the 2010 parliamentary election, when Viktor Orbán and his Fidesz party formed a government with two-thirds majority, Farkas became de facto representative and liaison politician between the Roma community and the Hungarian government. A Gypsy Conciliation Council was established in 2013 too, with the involvement of Farkas, but the organization never worked in practice.

Under his leadership, the National Roma Council established an employment cooperative called Bridge to the World of Work ("Híd a munka világába") in March 2014; Farkas became head of the project. In the following years, the cooperative received about five billion HUF in European Union funding to help the unemployed of Roma origin find employment. However it was revealed in February 2015 that the leaders of the project bought expensive cars and spent HUF 1.6 billion on luxury items, including office building, IT equipment and overpriced impact studies. Opposition politician Ákos Hadházy filed a complaint alleging budget fraud. The National Bureau of Investigation, the General Prosecutor's Office and the National Tax and Customs Administration (NAV) launched an investigation in May 2015. In practice, the project became the paying point for Farkas and his allies from public funds. Due to the scandal, Farkas lost majority support within the ORÖ by the autumn of 2015, his relationship with his successor István Hegedüs had deteriorated too. Farkas then tried to get a majority through bribes against Hegedüs and his supporters. After Hegedüs suffered a heart attack in January 2016, Farkas' group attempted to replace him with János Balogh and to seize majority within ORÖ. Farkas was replaced as head of the Bridge to the World of Work project in January 2016. He was succeeded by fellow Fidesz politician of Romani ancestry, László Berényi. On 8 March 2016, the Ministry of Human Resources withdrew from the contract with the National Roma Council on the project due to suspicions of irregularities in the use of financial resources and reclaimed the money from the Roma municipality. Beside the Hungarian agencies, the European Anti-Fraud Office (OLAF) also launched an investigation in June 2016.

Due to the scandal, Farkas lost all of his political influence but remained a member of the National Assembly. He was expelled from the Committee on European Affairs in September 2016. He has never made a statement to the press or speak in plenary since the scandal erupted. Farkas was re-elected president of Lungo Drom in June 2017. According to László Vajda, president of Lungo Drom in Zala County, only those delegates who supported Farkas brought the vote. Vajda, who was also not invited to the delegates' meeting, said that the delegates' decision would be challenged in court. Vajda said individuals who had never been members of the Lungo Drom also took part in the vote.

Despite the corruption case, the ruling party Fidesz selected Farkas to its national list for the 2018 parliamentary election, through which he gained a mandate. He was involved in the Legislative Committee from May 2018 to May 2022. The case had no suspects in November 2018 and not even Flórián Farkas was heard, even though he signed most of the contracts. In November 2018, OLAF also launched an investigation into the case. In May 2021, the Prosecutor's Office responded to the HVG request in the same way that it had previously asked Ákos Hadházy, an independent MP, that "five people had already been questioned", with no indication of a different outcome. Farkas remained inactive in the 2018–2022 parliamentary term too. A leaked audio recording revealed in January 2022 that Attila Sztojka, the Government Commissioner for Roma Affairs stated that Farkas "cannot be rebuilt" because of the "plethora" of scandals around him. He said Farkas has expired himself not only among the Gypsies, but, worst of all, among his party [Lungo Drom] members. Thereafter, Farkas did not run in the 2022 Hungarian parliamentary election, his name was omitted from the national list of Fidesz.

== Personal life ==
He is married. His wife is Sarolta Flóriánné Farkas Ámit. They have three children.

Political offices
Preceded by New office	President of the National Gypsy Council; 1995–2003	Succeeded by Orbán Kolompár
Preceded by Orbán Kolompár	President of the National Roma Council; 2011–2014	Succeeded by István Hegedüs
