= Attila Sztojka =

Hungarian politician (born 1979)

Member of the National Assembly
- In office 2 May 2022 – 8 May 2026

Personal details
- Born: 25 October 1979 (age 46)
- Party: Fidesz

Attila Sztojka (born 25 October 1979) is a Hungarian politician, who was a member of the National Assembly from 2022 to 2026. He served as state secretary for social opportunities and Roma relations between 2024 and 2026.

Although he was elected MP via the Fidesz–KDNP joint national list in the 2026 Hungarian parliamentary election, Sztojka did not take up his parliamentary mandare.
