= Linguistic insecurity =

Lack of confidence about one's way of speaking

Linguistic insecurity comprises feelings of anxiety, self-consciousness, or lack of confidence in the mind of speakers surrounding their use of language. Often, the anxiety comes from speakers' belief that their speech does not conform to the perceived standard and/or the style of language that are expected by the speakers' interlocutor(s).

Linguistic insecurity is situationally induced and is often based on a feeling of inadequacy regarding personal performance in certain contexts, rather than a fixed attribute of an individual. This insecurity can lead to stylistic, and phonetic shifts away from an affected speaker's default speech variety; these shifts may be performed consciously on the part of the speaker, or may be reflective of an unconscious effort to conform to a more prestigious or context-appropriate variety or style of speech.

Linguistic insecurity is linked to the perception of speech varieties in any community and so may vary based on socioeconomic class and gender. It is also especially pertinent in multilingual societies.

== Description ==
Linguistic insecurity is the negative self-image that speakers have regarding their own speech variety or language as a whole, especially in the perceived difference between phonetic and syntactic characteristics of their own speech and the characteristics of what is considered standard usage, encouraged prescriptively as a preferable way of speaking, or perceived socially to be the "correct" form of the language. Linguistic insecurity arises based on the perception of a lack of "correctness" regarding one's own speech, rather than any objective deficiencies in a particular language variety. The perception is at odds with modern linguistic knowledge, which generally holds that all forms of language are linguistically equal as devices of communication, regardless of the various social judgments attached to them. Modern linguistics normally refrains from making judgments about language as used by native speakers, rejecting the idea of linguistic correctness as scientifically unfounded, or at least assuming that any notions of correct usage are relative in nature; popular linguistic ideas and social expectations, however, do not necessarily follow the scholarly consensus.

In one of its earliest usages, the term linguistic insecurity was employed by the linguist William Labov in his 1972 paper on the social stratification of the pronunciation of /r/ to describe the attitude of employees at three different retail stores in New York City towards their own speech patterns in comparison to Standard English. Labov theorized that employees who had the most extreme shift in style from their own speech variety (a casual style) to the standard form (a more emphatic style) were more insecure in a linguistic sense.

The term has since been used to describe any situation in which a speaker is led to hypercorrect, or shift one's patterns of speech because of a negative attitude or lack of confidence regarding one's normal speech. The lack of confidence need not be consciously acknowledged by speakers for them to be affected by linguistic insecurity, and changes in pronunciation and stylistic shifts indicative of linguistic insecurity may emerge absent of the speakers' intent. Linguistic insecurity may also be a characteristic of an entire speech community, especially in how it relates to other speech communities of the same language that employ a more standardized form.

Linguistic insecurity may be induced by the belief that language is an extraneously-regulated system, which needs to be formally taught to its native speakers, rather than being acquired in naturally. That is often the case in standard language cultures in which a codified standard idiom tends to be equated with the language as a whole.

=== Standard and prestige forms ===
As linguistic insecurity is related to the perception of how one speaks in comparison to a certain form, the notion of standard and prestige forms of languages is important. The standard form of a language is regarded as the codified form of language used in public discourse, and the prestige form is the one perceived to receive the most respect accorded to any variety of the language. Variables that differentiate standard and prestige forms are phonetic realization, vocabulary, syntax, and other features of speech. The status of those forms is related to the concept of language ideology, which explains how varieties of language are correlated with certain moral, social or political values. Many societies value the belief that language homogeneity is beneficial to society; in fact, the existence of a "common language" is an intrinsic part of an imagined community, which defines a nation.

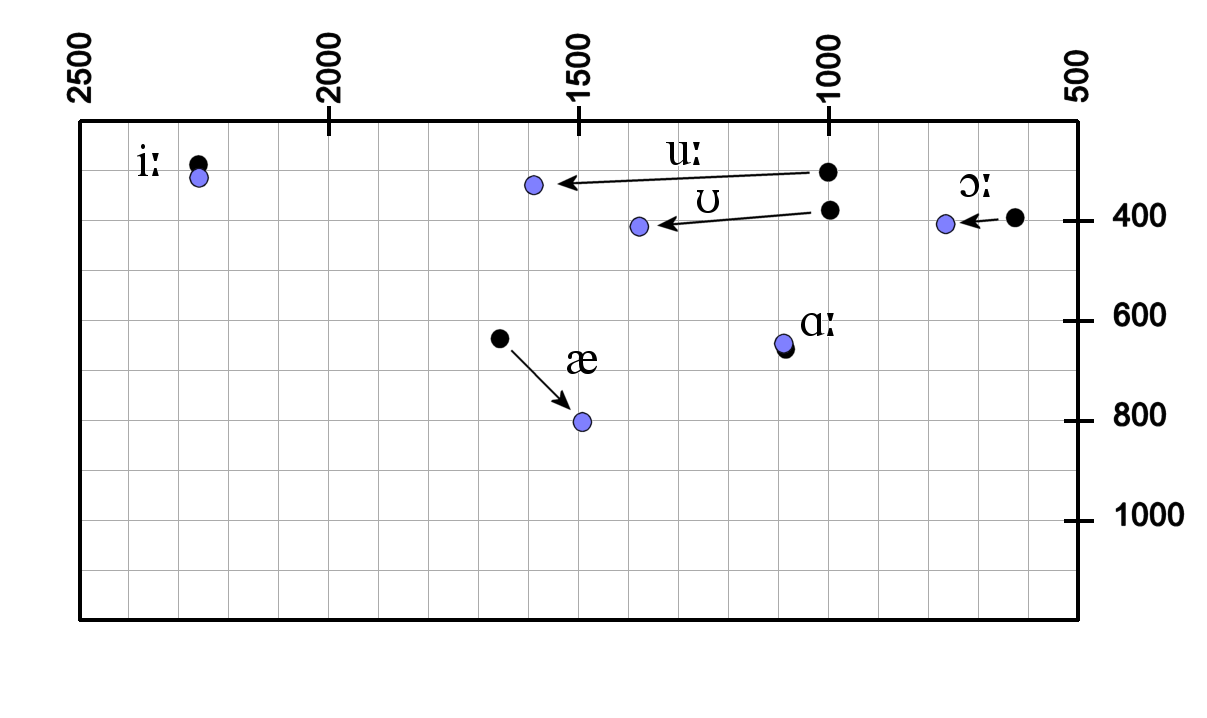
Vowels shifting in RP.

However, the concept of a language norm is highly flexible. Nations often codify a standard language that may be different from regional norms. For example, Standard English in the United Kingdom is based on the south-eastern dialect and accent, which are centered on London. In other parts of the UK, various dialects are spoken, such as Scots and Geordie; even in London, there exist Cockney and Estuary accents. Studies of young people in Glasgow show that they self-report linguistic insecurity, describe their own speech as 'slang' in comparison to the 'standard form', and attempt to incline their own speech to the standard.

Prestige forms may also demonstrate linguistic insecurity. Again in the UK, Received Pronunciation (RP), a prestige accent, has been affected by other varieties of speech. Though the standard form historically aimed towards RP, it is not a perfect imitation. The result is that speakers of RP now demonstrate changes in phonetic realization in the direction of the standard.

Despite those shifts, those who use RP accent tend to give the impression that they are well-educated and part of a higher socioeconomic class. That is because those traits are often associated with RP-speakers and index specific concepts that are presupposed by the community. Similarly, in general, forms of speech gain their status by their association with certain class characteristics. The indexicality does not need to be passive; for example, in Beijing, young urban professionals actively adopt usages considered typical of prestigious Hong Kong and Taiwan speech in an effort to index themselves as cosmopolitan. The indexicality also does not need to be positive; for example, speech forms may also index negative characteristics. In his study of attitudes towards varieties of American English, Preston demonstrates that people often associate the Southern accent with a lack of sophistication, which indexes its speakers with such an accent as being backwards and conservative, and that its speakers themselves perceive their language to be inferior and thus exhibit linguistic insecurity.

== Effects ==
Speakers experiencing linguistic insecurity exhibit alterations of their normal speech, which are reflective of their insecurity and often are a result of the speakers' attempt to compensate for the perceived deficiencies in their own speech variety. The effects of linguistic insecurity may come in the form of changes in pronunciation, as in the case of the retail store employees in Labov's example, or even syntactic deviations from the speaker's normal speech variant.

=== Hypercorrection ===
One documented linguistic effect of linguistic insecurity is hypercorrection, the overapplication of a perceived rule of grammar to appear more formal or to appear to belong to a more prestigious speech community. A common instance of hypercorrection in English is the use of the personal pronouns "you and I" as a correction of "me and you" in situations in which the accusative personal pronoun "me" is more appropriate. Because the use of "you and I" is internalized as the more grammatically-sound form in the mind of many English-speakers, that rule becomes overapplied in a situation when a speaker wants to compensate for perceived linguistic deficiencies. A speaker may try to avoid feelings of linguistic insecurity and perceived stigmatization by projecting a more educated or formal identity and emulating what is perceived as a more prestigious speech variety.

Inadvertently, hypercorrection may index a speaker as belonging to the very social class or societal group that led to the linguistic insecurity. For example, the linguist Donald Winford found after studying Trinidadian English that there was a knowledge that there was a stigmatization associated with less prestigious phonological variants, which created a situation in which individuals belonging to a "lower" social class would attempt to replicate phonological aspects of the more prestigious forms of English but did so unsuccessfully and thus engaged in hypercorrection.

==== Code-switching ====
In addition to hypercorrection, code-switching may also be performed by people who speak multiple languages and dialects. It may happen when speakers of one language fluently switches to another language in an interaction or conversation. Sociocultural studies in code-switching suggest identity is a factor to be taken into account. Identity can play a large role in linguistic insecurity as certain identities experience economic and social advantage. The identity factor is prevalent when marginalized groups switch to speak the more dominant standard language in the interaction.

=== Shifting registers ===
Speakers experiencing linguistic insecurity may also undergo, either consciously or unconsciously, a change in register from their default language variety. Linguistic register refers to a variety of speech in a given language that corresponds to a specific situational purpose or social setting. An example of the phonological impact of register in English is when speaking in a formal setting, it is customary to pronounce words ending in -ing with a velar nasal rather than substituting it with the [n] sound that is typical of -ing endings in informal speech. A register shift cannot always be accounted for by documenting the individual phonological differences in speech from people's default speech variety to the newly-registered speech variety, but it instead may include a difference in the overall "tenor" of speech and in the way that speakers defer to their interlocutors who are more experienced in interacting in that register.

Having to navigate in a linguistic register markedly different from their own speech variety can be a catalyst for hypercorrection and other behavioral effects of linguistic insecurity, which can further contribute to a sense of communicative inadequacy if the speakers feel that they do not convincingly interact in that linguistic register.

== Forms ==
=== Social category ===
==== Socioeconomic class ====
Findings show that the members of the lower middle class have the greatest tendency toward linguistic insecurity. Labov notes that evidence of their insecurity can be found in their wide range of stylistic variation, fluctuation in given stylistic contexts, conscious striving for correctness, and negative attitude towards their native speech pattern.

After conducting a linguistic survey in 1960s New York City, Labov found evidence that the usage of /r/ by speakers was predictable except in a specific case involving the lower middle class. At the time, the pronunciation of /r/ at the end of words and before consonants became a prestige marker and the degree to which it was realized in casual speech correlated with the socioeconomic status of the respondents. However, members of the lower middle class showed a dramatic increase in the pronunciation of /r/ when a more formal style of speech was elicited, and it even surpassed the usage by the higher classes. Labov interpreted the tendency to hypercorrect by adopting the prestigious form of the high-ranking class as a sign of the linguistic insecurity of the lower middle class.

Explanations for why the lower middle class exhibits that tendency have yet to be fully explored. A study conducted by Owens and Baker (1984) shows that the lower middle class of Winnipeg, Manitoba, Canada had highest scores for the CILI (Canadian Index of Linguistic Insecurity), which was adopted from Labov's original test, the ILI (Index of Linguistic Insecurity). In their paper, Owens and Baker hypothesize that the effect can be explained by an interaction between behavior and attitudes about social status. Members of the lower middle class are caught between the linguistic behavior of the classes below them and the attitudes of the upper class and accept the idea of correct speech from those above them, but changes in their usage lag behind changes in attitude. They identify the upper class usage as correct and admit that their behavior is different, which leads to a disparity that manifests itself as linguistic insecurity.

Though Owens and Baker admit that a measure of the mobility aspirations of the respondents is needed to test their explanation, others agree that the effect can be best interpreted as a function of upward social mobility, rather than of social class distinctions themselves. In his later work, Labov highlights that it is often the second-highest status groups that display the steepest slope of style shifting, the most hypercorrection, the highest levels on linguistic insecurity tests, and the strongest tendency to stigmatize the speech of others in subjective evaluation tests for that variable. In many cases of socioeconomic stratification, that group is equated with the lower middle class.

==== Gender ====
In the Owens and Baker study mentioned above, the authors used the CILI and ILI test to conclude that women are more linguistically insecure than men. Out of a sampling data of 80 participants, 42 of whom were female, women scored higher on the ILI and the CILI, which indicates high manifest linguistic insecurity. On the CILI, the mean score was 3.23 for females and 2.10 for males. On the ILI, the means scores were 2.23 for females and 1.40 for males. Though the t-tests for the differences were significant only at the 0.07 and the 0.06 levels, the authors felt that was caused by the small sample size and that the uniformity of the results was enough to confirm their hypothesis. Additionally, those findings are consistent with Labov's original New York study and led Owens and Baker to the conclusion that women display more linguistic insecurity than men.

=== Cross-linguistic contact ===
==== Dialect ====
Linguistic insecurity can be heightened in speech communities in which multiple dialects exist beyond the standard language. Insecure speakers suffer from a negative attitude toward the speech of their dialect group and often feel pressured to mask their dialectal versatility since the norm of communication is to use the standard form. Bidialectal speakers, who speak both the standard and their own dialect, are most vulnerable to this problem because they are more aware of linguistic norms and the contexts to which they must adapt their speech to these norms. For monodialectal speakers, conversations can be difficult or stressful because they are locked into their nonstandard dialect and have a harder time explaining themselves in the standard dialect.

==== Standard varieties ====
Speakers of a variety of a given language that is standard in some settings but is considered non-dominant in others are reported to be subject to linguistic insecurity. For instance, a construction of Standard Canadian English such as to be done homework rather than to be done with homework may be misunderstood as incorrect by speakers of Standard American or Standard British English and trigger linguistic insecurity in Canadian Anglophones. Oakes speaks in that context of "pluricentric linguistic justice" that is barred as a result of linguistic insecurity.

==== African American Vernacular English ====
African American Vernacular English (AAVE) is a dialect of American English that is associated with the African American ethnic group. Speakers of AAVE (as well as speakers of other dialects found in the United States) have encountered a variety of sociolinguistic problems in many important institutions since Standard American English (SAE) is the predominant form of English used.

One of these important institutions is school. Concerns about the academic achievement of African American children have motivated researchers to study the role AAVE plays, but there are various explanations for how it might affect achievement. Dialectal differences could lead to inappropriate testing procedures or prejudice of educators, who would lower their expectations and assume the child is inarticulate and hesitant). In that environment, AAVE-speaking students may develop linguistic insecurity and lead to a rejection of the standard language as "posh" or reluctance to speak at all to hide their "inability" to use language. AAVE-speaking students have also been shown to hypercorrect in attempts to speak or write in Standard English. Insecurity about what "sounds right" may result in the avoidance of the invariant "be" by deleting it from an instance in which it would be standard to use it (e.g. "They said they were told if they didn't follow orders they would courtmarshled or shot as deserters").

Speakers of AAVE may also encounter problems in seeking treatment for mental health problems, where professionals predominantly use Standard American English. Linguistic insecurity can be a cause of miscommunication for AAVE patients. For example, mental health care providers may attribute speaker's behavior to cognitive or emotional deficits, even to a psychopathological extent. In a study of a psychiatric ward, Bucci and Baxter collected data on the impact of linguistic problems of the patients, which included several monodialectal speakers and bidialectal speakers of AAVE.

In the case of "Jimmy," his background led his therapist to believe that his "muteness" resulted from emotional or neurophysiological problems. However, Bucci and Baxter found evidence to indicate that his position as a monodialectal AAVE speaker made him unwilling to speak. His linguistic insecurity in the clinical setting with a norm of SAE made him reluctant to speak, but he was fluent and expressive in his own speech community and with his descriptions of his experiences outside the ward. Moreover, standard therapeutic techniques may have a negative and opposite effect for linguistically insecure patient. In the case of the bidialectal "Arlene," the patient thought that her speech was an obstacle to communication because her therapist often asked her what she meant. The intervention of eliciting answers was meant to encourage Arlene to speak more freely, but her linguistic insecurity led her to focus her attention on the perceived inadequacy of her language style, and she responded by saying less, rather than more.

==== Malinke-Bambara ====
One example of linguistic insecurity arising from dialectal differences may be found in work done by Canut and Keita (1994). They conducted a study of an area in the Mandingo zone of Mali that exhibited a linguistic continuum between two different forms: Bambara and Malinke. The study included two villages (Bendugu and Sagabari), a middle-sized town (Kita), and the capital of Mali (Bamako). Bamako is on the Bambara extreme of the continuum, Sagabari is on the Malinke extreme, and Bendugu and Kita are in between. The linguistic features that are important for understanding the differences between the dialects are mainly phonological.

	/c/	/f/	/r/ (intervocalic)	/k/
Bamako	[c]	[f]	[r]	[k]
Kita	[k]	[f]	[r]	[k] and [x]
Bendugu	[k]	[h]	[d]	[x]
Sagabari	[k]	[h]	[t]	[x]

The area encompassing the four places has relatively high social mobility, and those who gain status often move towards Bamako, the capital. The dialects follow that pattern, as those closer to the capital are perceived as more prestigious; the most peripheral form in Sagabari may even prompt mockery of an individual who uses it. Thus, those speaking a dialect different from Bambara are likely to be affected by linguistic insecurity, particularly those closer to the Malinke end of the continuum.

Since migration is common, there are many examples of young migrants to the area who display linguistic insecurity. Most migrants who speak Malinke try to hide their origins and assimilate to the higher status society by changing the way that they speak. In their attempts to escape their geosocial status, but they tend to hypercorrect to the point that they create non-existent terms in Bambara. One example is replacing every /h/ in Malinke with the /f/ that is used in Bamako, which led one to say "young boy" /foron/ (which does not exist in Bamako) for "noble" /horon/.

==== Creole languages ====
Linguistic insecurity in relation to creoles has to do with the underlying assumption and classification of these languages as inferior forms of the parent languages from which they are derived. Typical of most non-official languages, creoles are regarded as mere degenerate variants and rudimentary dialects that are subsumed under the main "standard" languages for that particular community. With that popular view, creoles are thought to be impoverished, primitive outputs, which are far from their European target languages. The negative nonlinguistic implications lead to claims of creole use as being a "handicap" for their speakers. This has caused speakers of the creole languages to experience insecurity and lack of confidence in the use of their form of language, which has undermined the prevalence of creoles spoken in societies.

One explanation concerning the different attitudes of speakers is that some populations are more insistent of the use of their particular form of language, as it is commonly claimed to be more "pure." This assumption places that form as a more prestigious standard and creates a tense environment that promotes feelings of insecurity to those who do not follow the standard (and speak "impure" variations).

An instance of linguistic insecurity can be found in relation to Haitian Creole, which developed from a combination of French and other languages. Although almost everyone in Haiti grows up hearing and speaking exclusively the creole, it continues to be seen as an inferior, primitive tongue and as a malformed version of French. The disfavor against Haitian Creole, which exists throughout society, is present even among those who can speak no other language. The cause for that view has been attributed to the association of French with prestige, as well as the language of most of the island's land-owning, well-educated elite. Those judgments contribute to the widespread belief that success is linked to French and that one must speak French to become part of the middle class, with a financially-stable job. That notion places Haitian Creole on a lower status. Though msot people cannot participate in the French-driven areas of society, the "ideology of disrespect and degradation" surrounding creoles leads to great linguistic insecurity. As Arthur Spears put it, an "internalized oppression" is present in those members, who relate important figures in society (and their success) to speaking French and devalue their own language, Haitian Creole.

==== Multilingual societies ====
Linguistic insecurity can arise in multilingual environments in speakers of the non-dominant language or of a non-standard dialect. Issues caused by the linguistic variation range from "total communication breakdowns involving foreign language speakers to subtle difficulties involving bilingual and bidialectal speakers". Multilingual insecurity can cause hypercorrection, code-switching, and shifting registers.

Divergence from the standard variety by minority languages causes "a range of attitudinal issues surrounding the status of minority languages as a standard linguistic variety." In multilingual societies, linguistic insecurity and subsequent effects are produced by identity status and marginalization of specific groups.

===== Quebec French =====
An example of mother-tongue-based linguistic insecurity in a multilingual environment is Quebec French. The general perception of Quebec French as lacking in quality and diverging from the norm has causes French-speaking Quebeckers to suffer from a sense of linguistic insecurity. Though French is widely spoken in Quebec, the French of France is considered by many to be the standard and prestigious form. That comparison and the divergence of Quebec French from the standard form in France have caused linguistic insecurity in speakers of Quebec France.

The separation from France after the 1763 Treaty of Paris and the multilingual environment have anglicized Quebec French in pronunciation and loanwords. Though speakers were aware of the differences between the French of Quebec and that of France, the foreign perception of Quebec French as "non-standard" was not an issue until the mid-19th century. The belief of the elite in France that Quebec French was "far removed from the prestigious variety spoken in Paris" had spread through the general public by the late 19th century and caused a deep sense of linguistic insecurity in French-speaking Quebec. The insecurity was twofold since most Quebeckers spoke neither the dominant language, English, nor, as they were being told, Standard French.

== See also ==
- Schizoglossia – Linguistic insecurity about one's native language
- Linguistic discrimination – Discrimination on the basis of language of an individual
- Standard language ideology – Concept of language having or being influenced by ideology
- Diglossia – Community restriction of languages or dialects to specific settings
- Foreign language anxiety – Unease when using a foreign language
- Language contact – Interaction between different languages
- Language shift – Change of a community's language over time
- Lingua franca – Concept in linguistics
- Minoritized language – Language that is marginalized, persecuted or banned
- Vergonha – Linguistic discrimination in France
