= Linguistic discrimination =

Discrimination on the basis of language of an individual

Linguistic discrimination (also called glottophobia, linguicism and languagism) is the unfair treatment of people based upon their use of language and the characteristics of their speech, such as their first language, their accent, the perceived size of their vocabulary (whether or not the speaker uses complex and varied words), their modality, and their syntax. For example, an Occitan speaker in France will probably be treated differently from a French speaker.

Based on a difference in use of language, a person may automatically form judgments about another person's wealth, education, social status, character or other traits, which may lead to discrimination. This has led to public debate surrounding localisation theories, likewise with overall diversity prevalence in numerous nations across the West.

Linguistic discrimination was at first considered an act of racism. In the mid-1980s, linguist Tove Skutnabb-Kangas captured the idea of language-based discrimination as linguicism, which was defined as "ideologies and structures used to legitimize, effectuate, and reproduce unequal divisions of power and resources (both material and non-material) between groups which are defined on the basis of language". Although different names have been given to this form of discrimination, they all hold the same definition. Linguistic discrimination is culturally and socially determined due to preference for one use of language over others. Using this same logic, this would make many modern slurs considered to be linguistic discrimination.

Scholars have analyzed the role of linguistic imperialism in linguicism, with some asserting that speakers of dominant languages gravitate toward discrimination against speakers of other, less dominant languages, while disadvantaging themselves linguistically by remaining monolingual.

According to Carolyn McKinley, this phenomenon is most present in Africa, where much of the population speaks European languages introduced during the colonial era; African states are also noted as instituting European languages as the main medium of instruction, instead of indigenous languages. UNESCO reports have noted that this has historically benefited only the African upper class, conversely disadvantaging the majority of Africa's population who hold varying level of fluency in the European languages spoken across the continent.

Scholars have also noted the influence of the linguistic dominance of English on academic disciplines; Anna Wierzbicka, professor of linguistics at the Australian National University, has described disciplines such as the social sciences and humanities as being "locked in a conceptual framework grounded in English", preventing academia as a whole from reaching a "more universal, culture-independent perspective."

== Linguistic prejudice ==
Speakers with certain accents may experience prejudice. For example, some accents hold more prestige than others depending on the cultural context. However, with so many dialects, it can be difficult to determine which is the most preferable. The best answer linguists can give, such as the authors of Do You Speak American?, is that it depends on the location and the speaker. Research has determined however that some sounds in languages may be determined to sound less pleasant naturally. Also, certain accents tend to carry more prestige in some societies over other accents. For example, in the United States speaking General American (a variety associated with the white middle class) is widely preferred in many contexts such as television journalism. Also, in the United Kingdom, the Received Pronunciation is associated with being of higher class and thus more likable. In addition to prestige, research has shown that certain accents may also be associated with less intelligence, and having poorer social skills. An example can be seen in the difference between Southerners and Northerners in the United States, where people from the North are typically perceived as being less likable in character, and Southerners are perceived as being less intelligent. As sociolinguist, Lippi-Green, argues, "It has been widely observed that when histories are written, they focus on the dominant class... Generally studies of the development of language over time are very narrowly focused on the smallest portion of speakers: those with power and resources to control the distribution of information."

== Origin ==
Linguistic discrimination appeared before the term was established. During the 1980s, scholars explored the connection between racism and languages. Linguistic discrimination was a part of racism when it was first studied. The first case found that helped establish the term was in New Zealand, where white colonizers judge the native population, Māori, by judging their language. Linguistic discrimination may originate from fixed institutions and stereotypes of the elite class. Elites reveal strong racism through writing, speaking, and other communication methods, providing a basis for discrimination. Their way of speaking the language is considered the higher class, emphasizing the idea that how one speaks a language is related to social, economic, and political status.

Later, linguistic ideology is introduced to sociolinguistics to address linguistic discrimination directly rather than under the category of racism. Linguistic ideology is defined as the conception or feeling that how a person speaks a certain language can imply social status. This concept further demonstrates that linguistic discrimination derives from the stereotype and cognition of how certain populations speak the language.

== Language and social group saliency ==
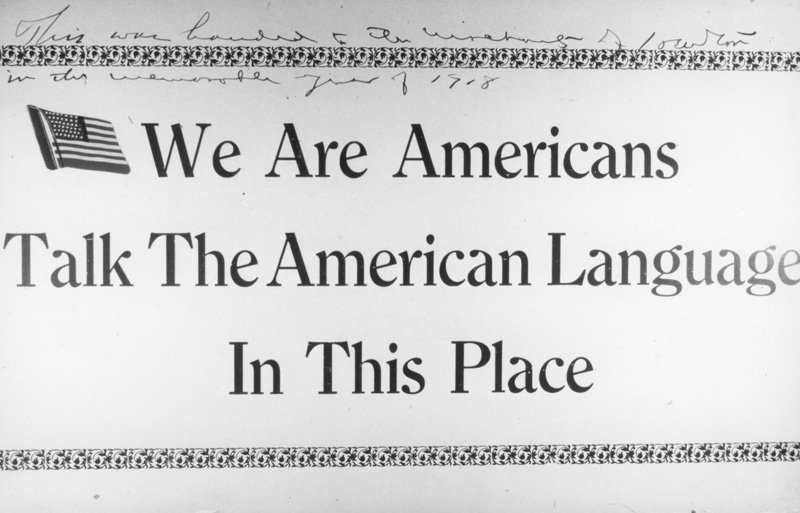
Linguistic discrimination is sometimes linked with belonging to a social group, as in patriotism and nationalism. This poster is propaganda from World War I.

It is natural for human beings to want to identify with others. One way we do this is by categorizing individuals into specific social groups. While some groups are often assumed to be readily noticeable (such as those defined by ethnicity or gender), other groups are less salient. Linguist Carmen Fought explains how an individual's use of language may allow another person to categorize them into a specific social group that may otherwise be less apparent. For example, in the United States it is common to perceive Southerners as less intelligent. Belonging to a social group such as the South may be less salient than membership to other groups that are defined by ethnicity or gender. Language provides a bridge for prejudice to occur for these less salient social groups.

== Impact ==
Linguistic discrimination is a form of racism. Impact of linguistic discrimination ranges from physical violence to mental trauma, and then to extinction of a language. Victims of linguistic discrimination may experience physical bullying in school and a decrease in earnings in jobs. In countries where a variety of languages exist, it is hard for people to obtain basic social service such as education and health care since they do not understand the language. Mentally, they may be ashamed or feel guilty to speak their home language.

People who speak a language that is not the mainstream language do not feel social acceptance. Research shows that countries with assimilation policies result in higher stress. They are forced to accept the mainstream language and foreign culture.

According to statistics, every two weeks an endangered language will be extinct. This is because, on the country level, linguistically marginalized populations must learn the common language to obtain resources. Their opportunities are very limited when they cannot communicate in a way everyone else understands.

== English language ==
English, being a language that most countries speak in the world, experiences a lot of linguistic discrimination when people from different linguistic backgrounds meet. Regional differences and native languages may have an impact on how people speak the language. For example, many non-native speakers in other countries fail to pronounce the dental fricative sounds such as [θ] (as in th in the word thin) and [ð] (as in th in the word they) which instead, they use the Voiceless alveolar fricative [s] sound, which is more common in other languages, to replace it. "Thank" becomes "sank," and "mother" becomes "mozer." In Russian-English pronunciation, "Hi, where were you" may be pronounced like "Hi, veir ver you" since it is closer to Russian. It may be considered an inappropriate way to speak the language and be ridiculed by native speakers. Research has shown that this linguistic discrimination may lead to bullying and violence in the worst case. However, linguistic discrimination may not always be bad bias or cause superiority. A mixed pronunciation of different languages may also lead to mixed reactions. Some people who are native to the language may find these mixes to be special and good, while some others are unfriendly with these speakers. Nonetheless, all these are stereotypes of certain languages and may lead to cognition bias. In fact, in many countries where English is the lingua franca, accent is a part of identity.

== Colonization ==
=== History of linguistic imperialism ===
The impacts of colonization on linguistic traditions vary based on the form of colonization experienced: trader, settler or exploitation. Congolese-American linguist Salikoko Mufwene describes trader colonization as one of the earliest forms of European colonization. In regions such as the western coast of Africa as well as the Americas, trade relations between European colonizers and indigenous peoples led to the development of pidgin languages. Some of these languages, such as Delaware Pidgin and Mobilian Jargon, were based on Native American languages, while others, such as Nigerian Pidgin and Cameroonian Pidgin, were based on European ones. As trader colonization proceeded mainly via these hybrid languages, rather than the languages of the colonizers, scholars like Mufwene contend that it posed little threat to indigenous languages.

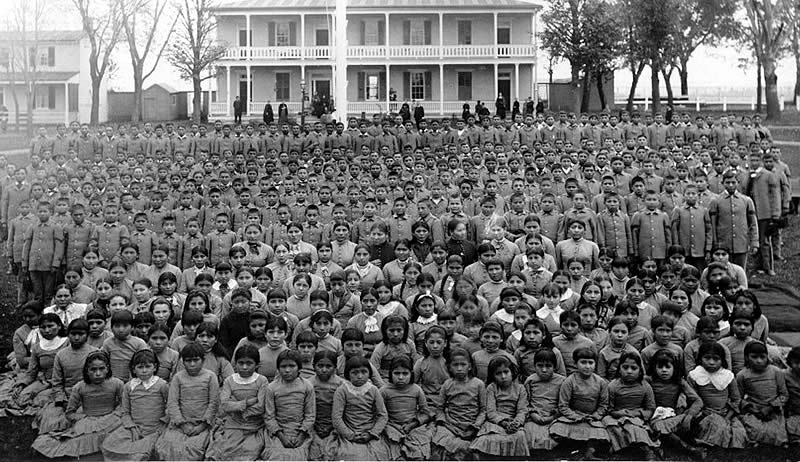
A photo of students at the Carlisle Indian Industrial School

Trader colonization was often followed by settler colonization, where European colonizers settled in these colonies to build new homes. Hamel, a Mexican linguist, argues that "segregation" and "integration" were two primary ways through which settler colonists engaged with aboriginal cultures. In countries such as Uruguay, Brazil, Argentina, and those in the Caribbean, segregation and genocide decimated indigenous societies. Widespread death due to war and illness caused many indigenous populations to lose their indigenous languages. In contrast, in countries that pursued policies of "integration", such as Mexico, Guatemala and the Andean states, indigenous cultures were lost as aboriginal tribes mixed with colonists. In these countries, the establishment of new European orders led to the adoption of colonial languages in governance and industry. In addition, European colonists also viewed the dissolution of indigenous societies and traditions as necessary for the development of a unified nation state. This led to efforts to destroy tribal languages and cultures: in Canada and the United States, for example, Native children were sent to boarding schools such as Col. Richard Pratt's Carlisle Indian Industrial School. Today, in countries such as the United States, Canada and Australia, which were once settler colonies, indigenous languages are spoken by only a small minority of the populace.

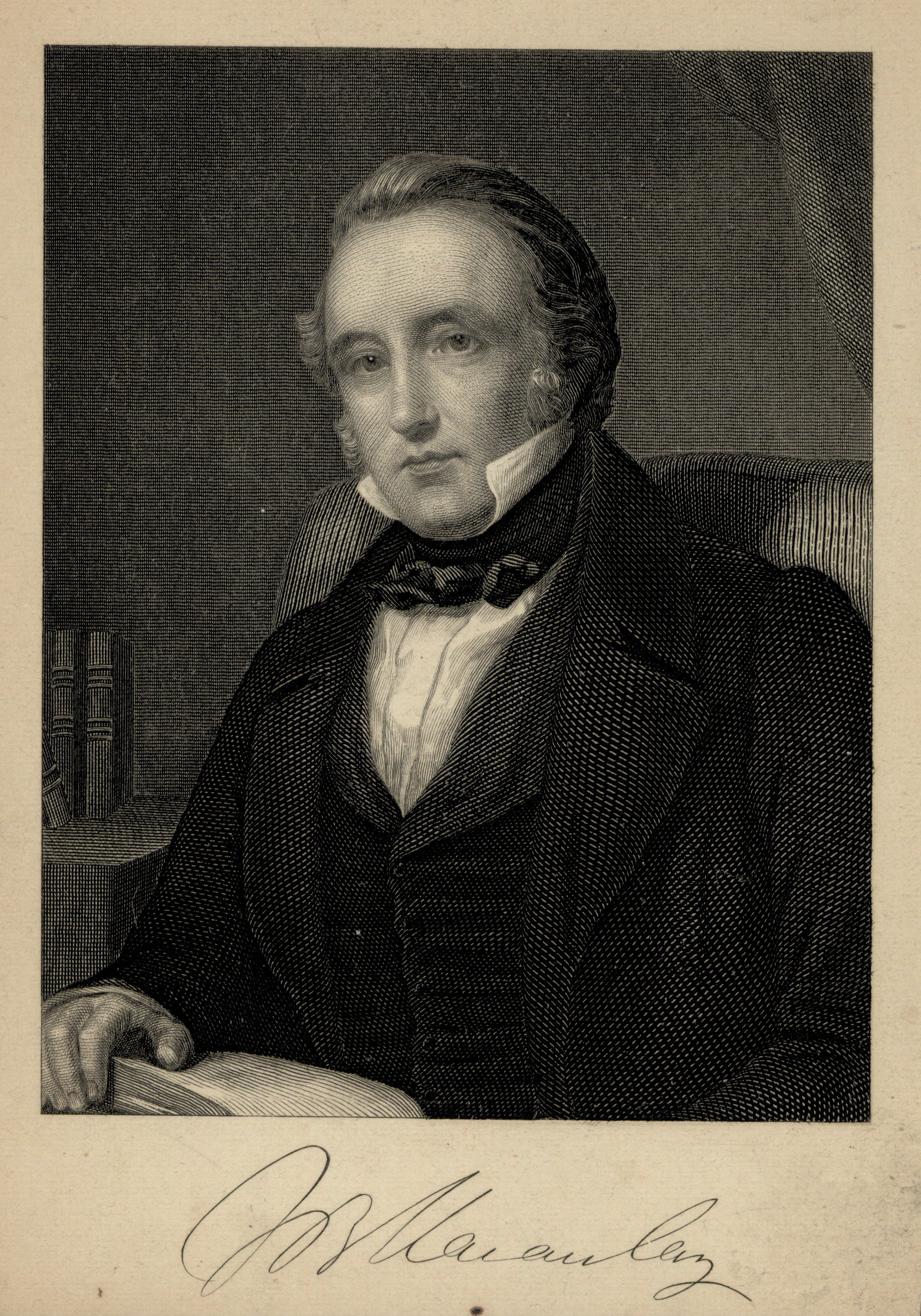
Portrait of Lord Macaulay

Mufwene also draws a distinction between settler colonies and exploitation colonies. In the latter, the process of colonization was focused on the extraction of raw materials needed in Europe. As a result, Europeans were less invested in their exploitation colonies, and few colonists planned to build homes in these colonies. As a result, indigenous languages were able to survive to a greater extent in these colonies compared to settler colonies. In exploitation colonies, colonial languages were often only taught to a small local elite. During the period of British rule in India, for example, Lord Macaulay highlighted the need for "... a class who may be interpreters between us and the millions who govern... a class of persons, Indian in blood and color, but English in taste, in my opinion, in morals and in intellect" in his now-famous "Macaulay minutes", which were written in support of the English Education Act of 1835. The linguistic differences between the local elite and other locals exacerbated class stratification, and also increased inequality in access to education, industry and civic society in postcolonial states.

=== Culture ===
Several postcolonial literary theorists have drawn a link between linguistic discrimination and the oppression of indigenous cultures. Prominent Kenyan author Ngugi wa Thiong'o, for example, argues in his book Decolonizing the Mind that language is both a medium of communication, as well as a carrier of culture. As a result, linguistic discrimination resulting from colonization has facilitated the erasure of pre-colonial histories and identities. For example, African slaves were taught English and forbidden to use their indigenous languages. This severed the slaves' linguistic and thus cultural connection to Africa.

=== Colonial languages and class ===
In contrast to settler colonies, in exploitation colonies, education in colonial tongues was only accessible to a small indigenous elite. Both the British Macaulay Doctrine, as well as French and Portuguese systems of assimilation, for example, sought to create an "elite class of colonial auxiliaries" who could serve as intermediaries between the colonial government and local populace. As a result, fluency in colonial languages became a signifier of class in colonized lands.

In postcolonial states, linguistic discrimination continues to reinforce notions of class. In Haiti, for example, working-class Haitians predominantly speak Haitian Creole, while members of the local bourgeoisie are able to speak both French and Creole. Members of this local elite frequently conduct business and politics in French, thereby excluding many of the working-class from such activities. In addition, D. L. Sheath, an advocate for the use of indigenous languages in India, also writes that the Indian elite associates nationalism with a unitary identity, and in this context, "uses English as a means of exclusion and an instrument of cultural hegemony".

=== Linguistic discrimination in education ===
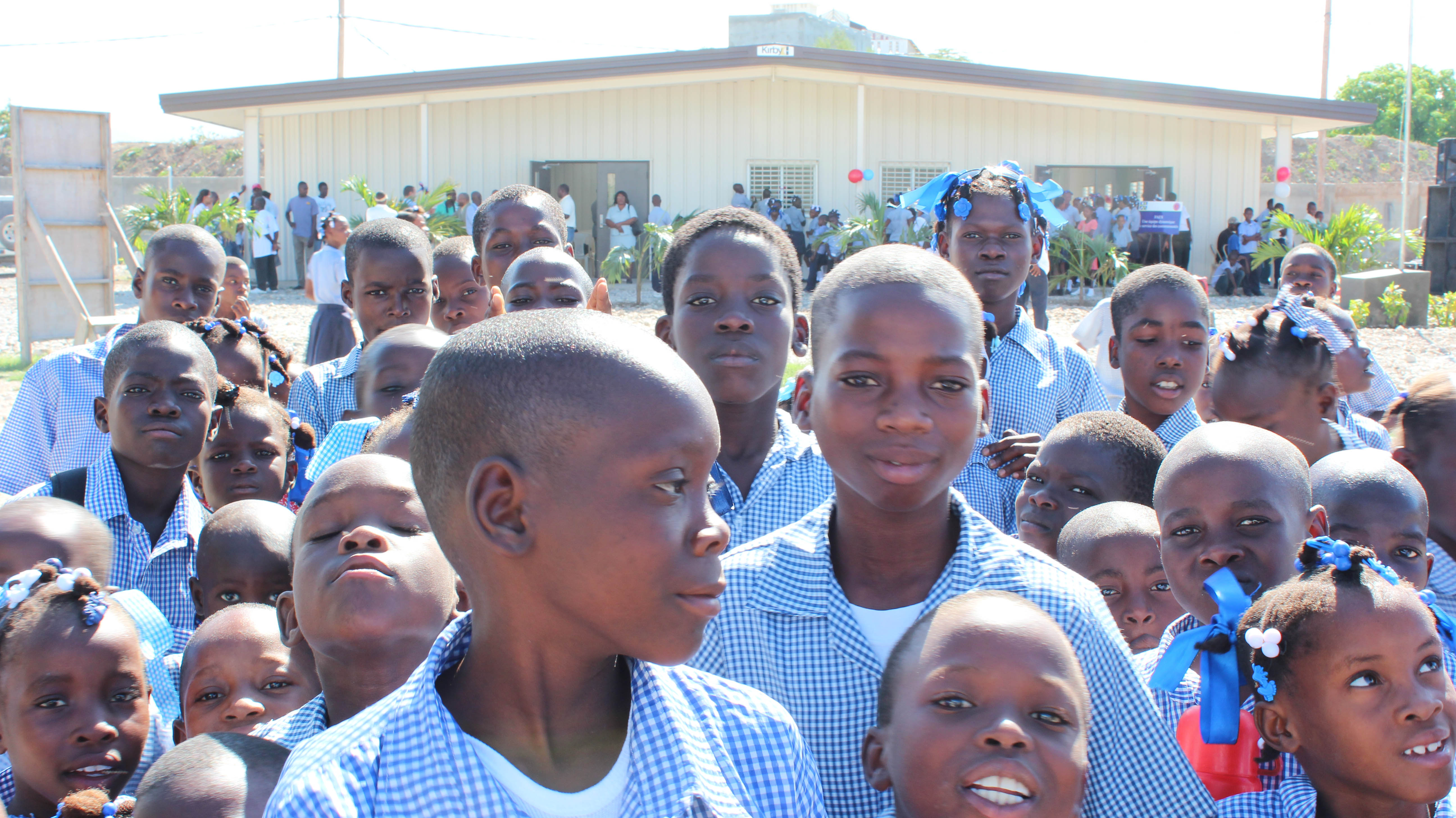
Photo of school children in Haiti

Class disparities in postcolonial nations are often reproduced through education. In countries such as Haiti, schools attended by the bourgeoisie are usually of higher quality and use colonial languages as their means of instruction. On the other hand, schools attended by the rest of the population are often taught in Haitian Creole. Scholars such as Hebblethwaite argue that Creole-based education will improve learning, literacy and socioeconomic mobility in a country where 95% of the population are monolingual in Creole. However, resultant disparities in colonial language fluency and educational quality can impede social mobility.

On the other hand, areas such as French Guiana have chosen to teach colonial languages in all schools, often to the exclusion of local indigenous languages. As colonial languages were viewed by many as the "civilized" tongues, being "educated" often meant being able to speak and write in these colonial tongues. Indigenous language education was often seen as an impediment to achieving fluency in these colonial languages, and thus deliberately suppressed.

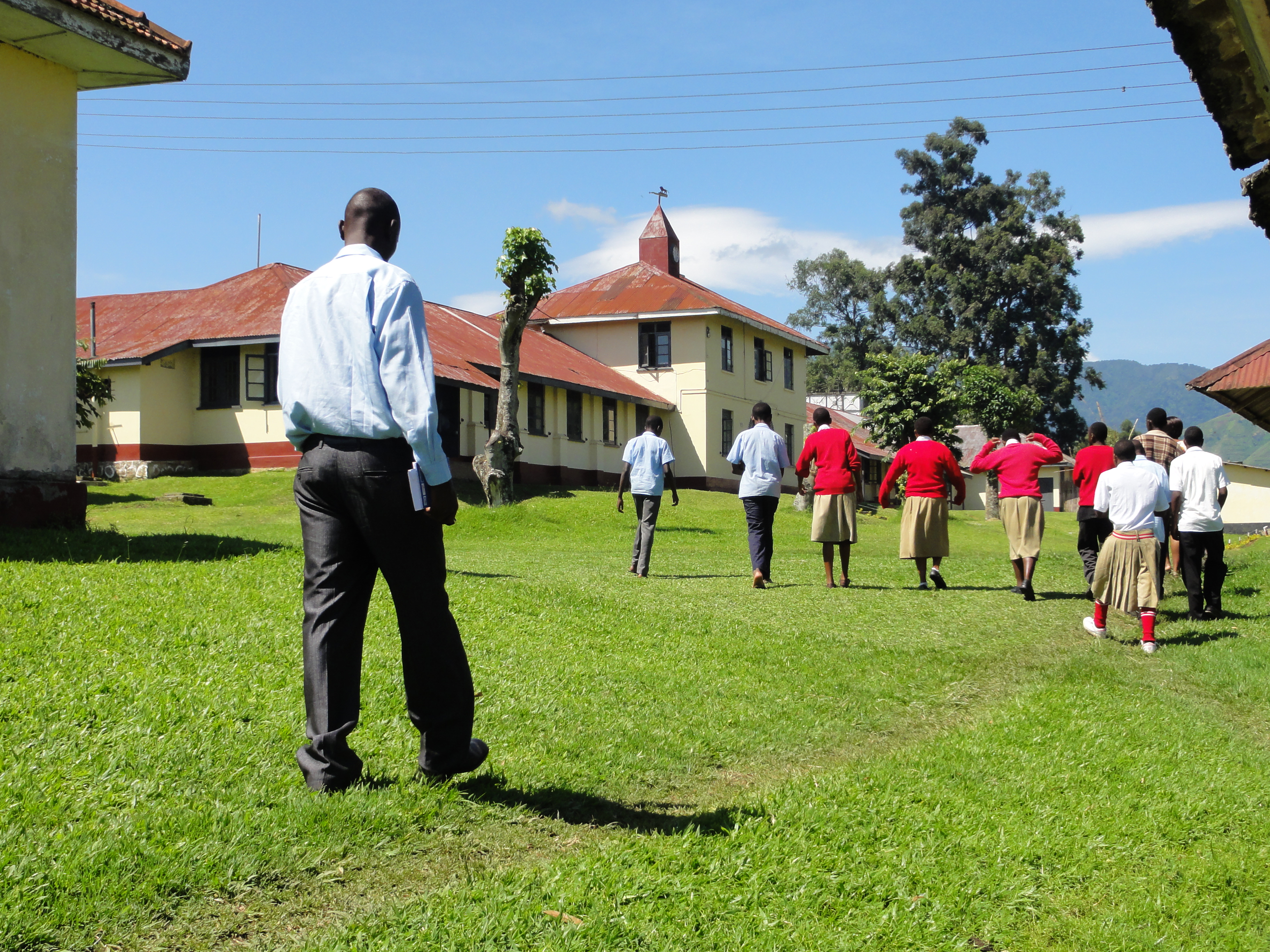
Photo of a school in Uganda

Certain Commonwealth nations such as Uganda and Kenya have historically had a policy of teaching in indigenous languages and only introducing English in the upper grades. This policy was a legacy of the "dual mandate" as conceived by Lord Lugard, a British colonial administrator in Nigeria. However, by the post-war period, English was increasingly viewed as necessary skill for accessing professional employment and better economic opportunities. As a result, there was increasing support amongst the populace for English-based education, which Kenya's Ministry of Education adopted post-independence, and Uganda following their civil war. Later on, members of the Ominde Commission in Kenya expressed the need for Kiswahili in promoting a national and pan-African identity. Kenya therefore began to offer Kiswahili as a compulsory, non-examinable subject in primary school, but it remained secondary to English as a medium of instruction.

While the mastery of colonial languages may provide better economic opportunities, the Convention against Discrimination in Education and the UN Convention on the Rights of the Child also states that minority children have the right to "use [their] own [languages]". The suppression of indigenous languages within the education system appears to contravene this treaty. In addition, children who speak indigenous languages can also be disadvantaged when educated in foreign languages, and often have high illiteracy rates.

=== Governance ===
As colonial languages are used as the languages of governance and commerce in many colonial and postcolonial states, locals who only speak indigenous languages can be disenfranchised. By forcing the locals to speak the colonizers' language, colonizers assimilate the indigenous people and hold colonies longer. For example, when representative institutions were introduced to the Algoma region in what is now modern-day Canada, the local returning officer only accepted the votes of individuals who were enfranchised, which required indigenous peoples to "read and write fluently... [their] own and another language, either English or French". This caused political parties to increasingly identify with settler perspectives rather than indigenous ones.

It is a common approach for colonizers to set language limitations. Japanese government in 1910 enacted decrees in colony Korea to eliminate existing Korean culture and language. All schools must teach Japanese and Hanja. By doing so, Japanese government was able to make Korea more dependent on Japan and colonize Korea longer.

Even today, many postcolonial states continue to use colonial languages in their public institutions, even though these languages are not spoken by the majority of their residents. For example, the South African justice system still relies primarily on English and Afrikaans as its primary languages, even though most South Africans, particularly Black South Africans, speak indigenous languages. In these situations, the use of colonial languages can present barriers to participation in public institutions.

== Education ==
=== Monolingual ideologies in schooling ===
The monolingual habitus refers to a deep-seated set of assumptions within national school systems that a single standard language of instruction is the only legitimate medium of education. Developed by Ingrid Gogolin based on Pierre Bourdieu's concept of habitus, the term describes a professional disposition rooted in the 18th- and 19th-century formation of European nation-states, which used linguistic homogenization to foster national unity. This disposition treats monolingualism as the universal "normality", rendering the linguistic diversity of students in multilingual societies invisible to the institution. Gogolin's research in German schools found that teachers assumed a shared "feeling for language" among pupils, expecting them to refine existing skills rather than develop new linguistic systems.

A survey of 775 teachers across 48 secondary schools in Flanders, Belgium, a region whose language-in-education policy has been described as based on a "stringent monolingual ideology", examined teachers' beliefs about language in schooling. The study found that monolingual beliefs were widespread amongst teachers; for example, 77.3% of respondents agreed that pupils should not be permitted to speak their home languages at school. Stronger adherence to these monolingual beliefs was associated with lower levels of teacher trust in students. However, there was no significant relation between these beliefs and teachers' own sense of self-efficacy. The authors interpreted these findings as suggesting that teachers attribute academic failure to a student's perceived linguistic deficit rather than questioning their own instructional competencies or pedagogical approaches.

A qualitative case study of teachers in a Portuguese school cluster examined how educators respond to linguistic diversity. The researchers identified a typology of three primary strategies: promoting Portuguese without involving students' languages, using English as a lingua franca for communication, and limited use of students' own home languages. Across all three, strategies were enacted through what the authors call a "monolingual vision," with students' home languages serving at best as temporary "bridges" to the language of schooling. Within this framework, students often remained in passive roles in these interactions. The authors concluded that there is an ongoing need to build systemic structural support for teachers and students to move beyond monolingual practice and to effectively implement multilingual pedagogies.

=== Medium of instruction and social stratification ===
Research on low-income, postcolonial contexts describes the medium of instruction as a mechanism of social stratification, in which prestige and economic value are concentrated in former colonial and dominant languages. In sub-Saharan Africa, these hierarchies manifest in models described as "weak" or "subtractive", exemplified by Rwanda's decision to adopt English-medium instruction, which the research links to processes of economic integration within the East African region. Research on India—which ranks fourth in the world for linguistic diversity with an estimated 300 to 400 languages—describes an extended case of this pattern.

The Indian linguistic hierarchy is defined by a "double divide": one between what Mohanty calls the "elitist language of power" (English) and regional vernaculars, and a second between those vernaculars and dominated indigenous and tribal minority languages. Mohanty characterizes this structure as a "multilingualism of the unequals," noting that children schooled in non-home languages, particularly Adivasi and poor students, face documented disadvantage. Between 1970 and 1998, the number of languages used in Indian schools as media of instruction or subjects declined from 81 to 41. Only three to four of over 100 tribal languages are regularly used for teaching, and less than 1% of tribal mother-tongue children are estimated to have access to native-language education. Evidence from Gujarat indicates that access to English-medium schooling is stratified along class lines, serving as economic and cultural capital for middle-class students.

India's three-language formula, adopted in 1968 and reaffirmed in the National Education Policy 2020, provides for the teaching of three languages in schools. Researchers document that for tribal and minority languages, the formula has "mostly remained untranslated into practice". Kandharaja and Vennela link this implementation gap to a census and enumeration architecture that privileges scheduled languages and creates "enumeration linguistic invisibility" for mother tongues in educational planning. The formula remains subject to implementation debate: in 2026, the Central Board of Secondary Education (CBSE) mandated that Class 9 students study three languages, including at least two native Indian languages; after students and parents approached the court, the board stated that the policy would not be applied retrospectively, allowing pupils already in Classes 7 to 9 to continue with their existing language combinations.

A scholarly debate examines the relationship between language and caste. Rita Kothari reports that some Dalit writers argue English functions as an emancipatory tool because it lacks the "memory of caste" found in Indian languages. According to this view, standard regional languages often normalize caste hegemony, while English provides a "casteless" medium that promises agency and recognition. This stance is symbolically anchored by the project of Dalit intellectual Chandra Bhan Prasad, who celebrated "Mother Goddess English" as a symbol of social liberation from traditional hierarchies. Kothari observes that while language scholarship often focuses on mother-tongue assertion, Dalit perspectives involve abandoning the mother tongue. She cites the Dalit writer Neerav Patel, for whom the absence of standard Gujarati "marks him out as a Dalit".

Jhingran estimates that nearly 25 per cent of primary school students in India face moderate to severe learning disadvantages due to their language background; about 10–12 per cent of school-going children face severe disadvantage, a group including children from scheduled tribes, children of migrants, and speakers of languages such as Bundelkhandi and Maithili that are commonly treated as dialects of Hindi. Mother-tongue-based multilingual education (MLE) initiatives have been implemented in India to address the language disadvantage of tribal children. These experimental programs began in Andhra Pradesh in 2004, covering eight tribal languages across 240 schools, and in Odisha in 2006, involving ten languages in 195 schools. The curricula utilize the mother tongue as the language of instruction and early literacy for the first three to five years of primary schooling. Evaluations of these programs reported positive effects on children's classroom achievement, school attendance, participation, and community involvement. However, Mohanty observes that these relatively small-scale initiatives remain under pressure to accommodate dominant languages at earlier stages.

=== Sorting and assessment of multilingual learners ===
A classroom ethnography of two primary schools in an Austrian city compared different models of German-language support for newcomer pupils. School 1 implemented a system of "pull-out classes" for language support, while School 2 utilized a model of "individualized learning" for all students within the mainstream classroom. The researchers analyzed how teachers' instructional strategies produced what they termed "pedagogies of (un)belonging". These were formed through three distinct logics: "marking students' 'fitness' to the mainstream classroom," "creating cultural (in)visibility," and "creating language hierarchies". The study concluded that while the two organizational models differed markedly in practice, "both seemed to uphold monolingualism and monoculturalism". Findings suggest that physical allocation within a mainstream setting does not alone determine belonging; rather, inclusion depends on whether pedagogy moves beyond "old" cultural and linguistic norms.

An international research synthesis of 19 studies documents a recurring overrepresentation of ethnic minority, immigrant, and Indigenous populations in special education across multiple countries. The researchers conclude that nearly all reviewed studies attribute this disproportionality to structural inequalities in society rather than cultural barriers. In Austria, data from 2019 indicates that migrant students were twice as likely to be placed in special schools as to attend academic secondary schools. Scholars link these placement trends to testing procedures that require proficiency in the language of schooling, noting the documented challenge of distinguishing language proficiency from learning disabilities during assessment.

== Examples ==
Linguistic discrimination is often defined in terms of prejudice of language. Although there is a relationship between prejudice and discrimination, they are not always directly related. Prejudice can be defined as negative attitudes towards a person based on their membership of a social group, whereas discrimination can be seen as the acts towards them. The difference between the two should be recognized because prejudice may be held against someone, but it may not be acted on. The following are examples of linguistic prejudice which may result in discrimination.

=== Linguistic prejudice and minority groups ===
While, theoretically, any speaker may be the victim of linguicism regardless of social and ethnic status, oppressed and marginalized social minorities are often the most consistent targets, due to the fact that the speech varieties that come to be associated with such groups have a tendency to be stigmatized.

=== In Canada ===
==== Francophones in Canada ====
Canada was first colonized by French settlers. Later, the British took control of Canada, while the influence of French culture and languages were still enormous. Historically, the Canadian government and English Canadians have discriminated against Canada's French-speaking population, during some periods in the history of Canada, they have treated its members as second-class citizens, and they have favored the members of the more powerful English-speaking population. This form of discrimination has resulted in or contributed to many developments in Canadian history, including the rise of the Quebec sovereignty movement, Quebecois nationalism, the Lower Canada Rebellion, the Red River Rebellion, a proposed Acadia province, extreme poverty and low socio-economic status of the French Canadian population, low francophone graduation rates as a result of the outlawing of francophone schools across Canada, differences in average earnings between francophones and anglophones in the same positions, fewer chances of being hired or promoted for francophones, and many other things.

==== Anglophones in Quebec ====
The Charter of the French Language, first established in 1977 and amended several times since, has been accused of being discriminatory by English-speakers. The law makes French the official language of Quebec and mandates its use (with exceptions) in government offices and communiques, schools, and in commercial public relations. The law is a way of preventing linguistic discrimination against the majority francophone population of Quebec who were for a very long time controlled by the English minority of the province. The law also seeks to protect French against the growing social and economic dominance of English. Though the English-speaking population had been shrinking since the 1960s, it was hastened by the law, and the 2006 census showed a net loss of 180,000 native English-speakers. Despite this, speaking English at work continues to be strongly correlated with higher earnings, with French-only speakers earning significantly less. The law is credited with successfully raising the status of French in a predominantly English-speaking economy, and it has been influential in countries facing similar circumstances. However, amendments have made it less powerful under the pressure from society and thus less effective than it was in the past.

=== In Europe ===
==== Linguistic disenfranchisement rate ====
The linguistic disenfranchisement rate in the EU can significantly vary across countries. For residents in two EU-countries that are either native speakers of English or proficient in English as a foreign language the disenfranchisement rate is equal to zero. In his study "Multilingual communication for whom? Language policy and fairness in the European Union", Michele Gazzola comes to the conclusion that the current multilingual policy of the EU is not in the absolute the most effective way to inform Europeans about the EU; in certain countries, additional languages may be useful to minimize linguistic exclusion.

In the 24 countries examined, an English-only language policy would exclude 51% to 90% of adult residents. A language regime based on English, French and German would disenfranchise 30% to 56% of residents, whereas a regime based on six languages would bring the shares of excluded population down to 9–22%. After Brexit, the rates of linguistic exclusion associated with a monolingual policy and with a trilingual and a hexalingual regime are likely to increase.

==== Linguistic discrimination towards languages in the Celtic nations ====
- During the period of British rule in Ireland, the Irish language was not taught in schools and held no official status until the establishment of the Irish Free State in 1922. In 2022 the Parliament of the United Kingdom passed the Identity and Language (Northern Ireland) Act. This granted official status to the Irish language in Northern Ireland.
- In Wales, English was seen as the language of progress and, at the behest of the children's parents, the speaking of Welsh was discouraged in schools, and the Welsh Not was used in some places to help with this during the 18th and 19th centuries.
- Scottish Gaelic was not taught in the educational system due to being "one of the chief, principal causes of barbarity and incivility" in the words of one statute.
- Scots was in 1946 not considered "a suitable medium of education or culture".

==== Other examples ====
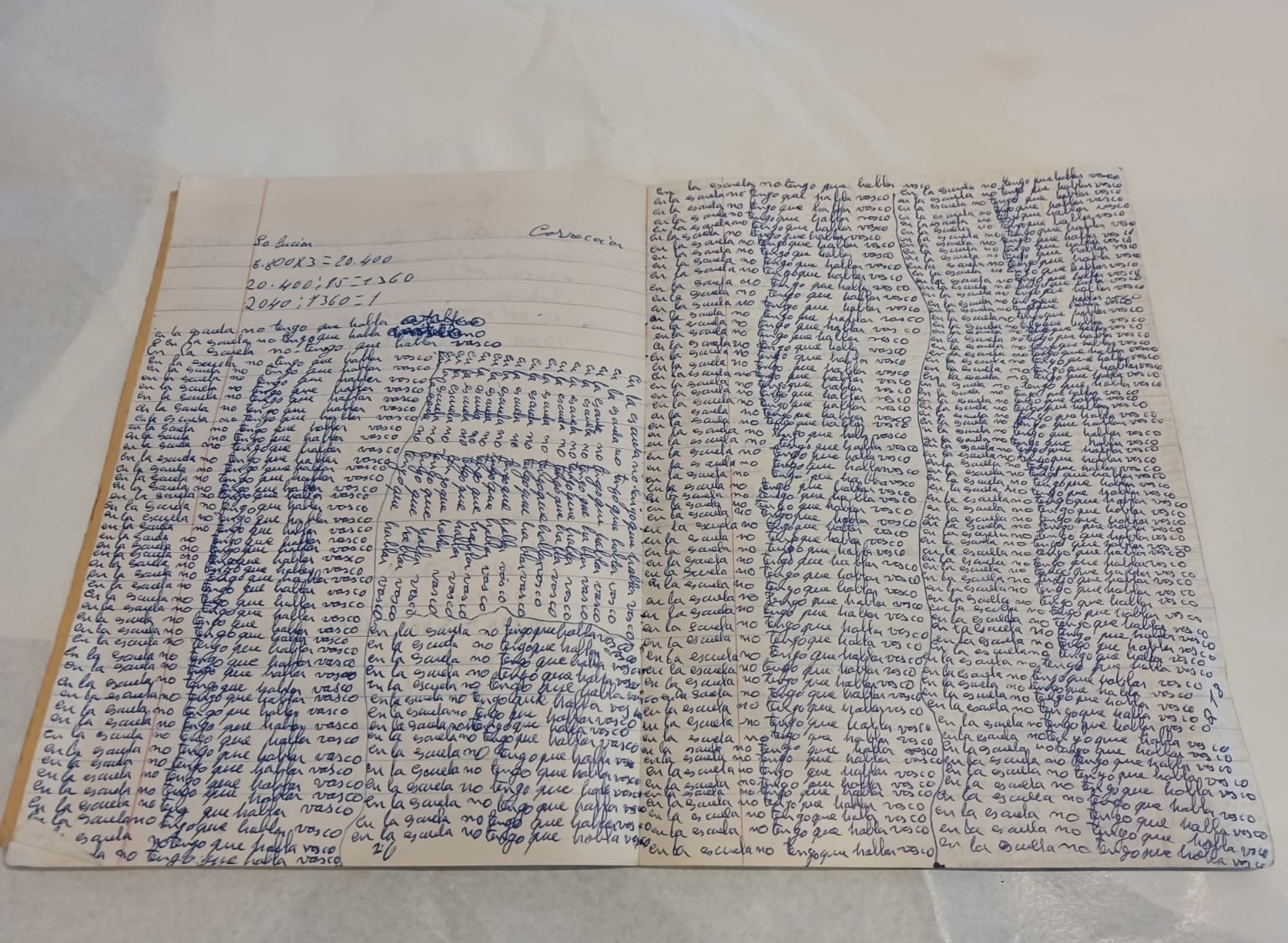
Lines assigned as punishment to a student during Franco's dictatorial regime, reading "I must not speak Basque at school".

- Basque, Catalan and Galician: Public usage of Basque, Catalan, Galician and other non-Spanish languages was persecuted and restricted during Francoist Spain, 1936 to 1978. From the 2010s onwards the Catalan language, despite a relatively successful process of normalization between the 1980s and the 2000s, experienced a re-growth of linguistic discrimination cases.
- Vergonha is the term used for the effect of various policies of the government of France on its citizens whose mother tongue was one of so-called patois. In 1539, with Article 111 of the Ordinance of Villers-Cotterêts, French, the language of the Île-de-France, became the only official language in the country although it was spoken by only a minority of the population. In education and administration, it was forbidden to use regional languages, such as Occitan, Catalan, Basque and Breton. The French government still has not ratified the European Charter for Regional or Minority Languages. On 8 April 2021, the Breton MP Paul Molac tried to pass a law to protect minority languages, and this law was passed by the French Parliament in Paris. However, the French Minister of Education, opposed to the teaching in minority languages, asked the Conseil Constitutionnel to declare it unconstitutional. This led to the law being constitutionally struck down on 21 May 2021. This decision recognizes the right of central administration to oppose the spelling of Basque and Breton names when they contain an ñ letter and forbid such names.
- Dutch in Belgium after its independence in 1830. French was for a long time the only official language and the only language of education, administration, law and justice despite Dutch being the most common language because it was rejected in the ruling class since it was identified with the Dutch rule between 1815 and 1830. That has led to widespread language shift in Brussels. Discrimination slowly faded over the decades and formally ended in the 1960s, when the Dutch version of the constitution became equal to the French version.
- Germanisation: Prussian discrimination of West Slavs in the 19th century, such as the removal of Polish from secondary (1874) and primary (1886) schools, the use of corporal punishment leading to such events as the Września school strike.
- Low Saxon (Low German) in Germany: Middle Saxon served as a lingua franca in the North and Baltic Sea areas from around the 12th/13th century until the early 16th century, but the nobility, institutions of authority and influential people in the 16th century started to force writers in Northern Germany to use Early New High German as their written language. This caused a change first in the written language and later on in the spoken language through a strong social stigmatization by what this process has been called an inner colonization by linguist Peter von Polenz that was similar to the Germanisation of Slavic peoples. This was also the time when the name of the language changed from sassesch or sassesche sprâke (Saxon language) to Plattdütsch (lit. Flat German).
- Italy:
  - in December 2010 RAI (Italian television) aired advertising spots in which actors spoke in "dialect" and were unable to understand each other. These advertising spots caused considerable disappointment both on social media and on the part of linguistic protection associations. After a few days, RAI withdrew the advertising spots, changing them with others in which the actors wished Happy Holidays in "dialect".
  - In an article published in "L'Espresso" on 17 September 2010, titled "Ël mè Aristòtil" because it was inspired by the existence of the Aristotle entry on the Piedmontese-language Wikipedia, Umberto Eco mocks the use of regional languages for "high" topics, writing "Ask yourselves why 'Aristotle's thought has substance as its main theme', translated into German is not funny, and translated into Venetian it sounds like Harlequin, servant of two masters." The article is no longer on the original site, but fortunately it has been reported in many documents.
  - when newspapers talk about Wikipedia in Regional Languages, it is often done with a mocking attitude. See for example the article in La Stampa of 6 June 2006, where they talk about "Hilarious Effects" ("Effetti esilaranti") and, obviously, "you can't help but laugh" ("non si può fare a meno di ridere").
  - In July 2025, Rete Ferroviaria Italiana removed the trilingual (Italian/Friulian/Slovenian) signs at the Cividale del Friuli station and the bilingual (Italian/Friulian) signs at the San Gottardo station (Udine). A few days later, following a wave of protests from residents and language protection associations, the restoration operation was launched.
  - In January 2026, skier Nicol Delago gave an interview in Ladin to RAI Ladinia and was overwhelmed by haters on social media.
- Magyarisation: For most of its existence, the Kingdom of Hungary had been a linguistically inclusionary state, but with the rise of ethnic nationalism in the early 19th century, this tradition was completely reversed due to a gradual adoption of nationalist and anti-minority policies by Hungary's ruling elites. The policy of Magyarisation (sometimes also "Hungarianisation") emerged in the 19th-century Kingdom of Hungary, and was practiced until the dissolution of Austria-Hungary in 1918. Magyarization saw efforts to marginalize and erase the use of minority languages in culture, education, politics, placenames and even everyday use. Targets included a number of Slavic languages (Slovak, Rusyn, Ukrainian, etc.), Romanian, and others. During the 1890s, hundreds of villages and towns throughout the Hungarian part of Austria-Hungary were forcibly renamed to more Hungarian forms. This included the renaming of already existing Hungarian placenames, previously in use for centuries, largely to promote the exclusionary nationalist ideology of the era. The strictest pro-Magyarization policies were adopted as legislation in 1907, known as the Apponyi Laws (Lex Apponyi), spearheaded by Albert Apponyi. The laws, as adopted, intentionally discriminated all minority languages, in an effort to completely exclude them from use in public life.
- Norwegianization: Former policy carried out by the Norwegian government directed at the Sámi and later the Kven people of the Sápmi region in Northern Norway.
- Russification: The 19th-century policies on the territories that were seized by the Partitions of Poland, such as banning Polish, Lithuanian and Belarusian in public places (1864), later (1880s), Polish was banned in schools and offices of Congress Poland. Ukrainian and Romanian were also discriminated against. Under the Russian Empire, there were some attempts in 1899–1917 to make Russian the only official language of Finland. (Note: The controversy concerning the reductions of Finnish autonomy is considered to already have begun in the early 1890s, see Woldemar von Daehn.)
  - In the Soviet Union, following the phase of Korenizatsiya ("indigenization") and before Perestroika (late 1930s to late 1980s), Russian was called "the language of friendship of nations" to the disadvantage of other languages of the Soviet Union.
  - The Russification and restraining of the linguistic rights of federal subjects in Russia, most notably in the federal subject of Tatarstan.
- Controversy over 2009 amendment to Slovak language law: The 1995 Slovak language law defined Slovak as the official language of the Slovak Republic, with other related laws guaranteeing rights to the country's minority languages (e.g. in bureaucracy, education, cultural venues, multilingual street and road signs). The law was subsequently amended in 1999, to guarantee further protection to minority language use and comply with EU standards. The law saw controversial amendments in 2009. Slovakia's 2006-2010 government passed a controversial amendment to aspects of the language law in 2009. Hungarians in Slovakia and politicians in Hungary accused the law of being discriminatory to their language group, claiming it endangers the rights to use Hungarian in the country. The 2010-2012 Slovak government opened the law again in 2011, voting to remove the previous controversial amendments.
- Serb organisations in Montenegro have reported discrimination of Serbian.
- Spain: Language policies of Francoist Spain refers to the attempted elevation of Castilian over the other languages of Spain during the dictatorship of Francisco Franco from 1936 to 1975.
- Ukraine: In 1804, all Ukrainian-language schools were banned in Ukraine under the Russian Empire. Ukrainian was denied its right of existence by the Russian rulers based on the Valuev Circular. In 1892, books were not allowed to be translated from Russian to Ukrainian. Since the end of 20th century in and the 21st century, an ongoing reverse discrimination has been applied: Constitution of Ukraine of 1996 made Ukrainian the only official language. The 2012 law giving the regional language status to Russian and other minority languages was declared unconstitutional. In 2015, as a part of the Decommunization Laws, the usage of Russian was further restricted. In 2016 import and distribution of Russian books has been banned. The book ban has been extended in 2022, and applied to music as well. In 2025 the parliament of Ukraine excluded Russian from the list of minority languages, despite Russian being de facto such a language.
- Germany: speakers of dialect often experience discrimination

=== In the United States ===
==== Perpetuation of discriminatory practices through terminology ====
Here and elsewhere the terms 'standard' and 'non-standard' make analysis of linguicism difficult. These terms are used widely by linguists and non-linguists when discussing varieties of American English that engender strong opinions, a false dichotomy which is rarely challenged or questioned. This has been interpreted by linguists Nicolas Coupland, Rosina Lippi-Green, and Robin Queen (among others) as a discipline-internal lack of consistency which undermines progress; if linguists themselves cannot move beyond the ideological underpinnings of 'right' and 'wrong' in language, there is little hope of advancing a more nuanced understanding in the general population.

==== Black Americans ====
Because some black Americans speak a particular non-standard variety of English which is often seen as substandard, they are often targets of linguicism. AAVE is often perceived by members of mainstream American society as indicative of low intelligence or limited education, and as with many other non-standard dialects and especially creoles, it is usually called "lazy" or "bad" English. According to researches, AAVE was initially a language that black people in America used to clearly express the life of oppression. People reflect that it is usually more difficult and understand and respond to an AAVE speaker.

AAVE usually contains words and phrases that have a different meaning from their original meaning in standard English. Pronunciation also differs from standard English. Some phrases require sufficient cultural background to understand. From the grammatic aspect, AAVE shows more complex structures that allow speaker to express a wider range with more specificity.

The linguist John McWhorter has described this particular form of linguicism as particularly problematic in the United States, where non-standard linguistic structures are often deemed "incorrect" by teachers and potential employers in contrast to other countries such as Morocco, Finland and Italy where diglossia (the ability to switch between two or more dialects or languages) is an accepted norm, and non-standard usage in conversation is seen as a mark of regional origin, not of intellectual capacity or achievement.

In the 1977 Ann Arbor court case, AAVE was compared against standard English to determine how much of an education barrier existed for children that had been primarily raised with AAVE. The assigned linguists determined that the differences, stemming from a history of racial segregation, were significant enough for the children to receive supplementary teaching to better understand standard English.

For example, a black American who uses a typical AAVE sentence such as "He be comin' in every day and sayin' he ain't done nothing" may be judged as having a deficient command of grammar, whereas, in fact, such a sentence is constructed based on a complex grammar which is different from that of standard English, not a degenerate form of it. A listener may misjudge the user of such a sentence to be unintellectual or uneducated. The speaker may be intellectually capable, educated, and proficient in standard English, but chose to say the sentence in AAVE for social and sociolinguistic reasons such as the intended audience of the sentence, a phenomenon known as code switching. Currently, AAVE is unique and organized enough to be a new language that derives from English but becomes its own new language. It shares many similar characteristics with standard English, but it has its own complexity with African American culture and history. Nonetheless, AAVE is only used in non-formal situations. It is not uncommon for AAVE speakers to speak in formal and standard English under formal situations.

Reports have shown that black workers who sound more "black" earn on average 12% less than their peers (data in 2009). In education, students who speak in AAVE are educated by their teachers that AAVE is not proper or is not correct. According to a survey, when a person speaks in AAVE, listeners tend to believe that the speaker is an African American from North America and is more related to adjectives such as poor, uneducated, and unintelligent. By merely sounding like black, a person may be assumed to be in certain image.

Furthermore, the legal system in the United States has been found to produce worse outcomes for speakers of AAVE. Court reporters are less accurate at transcribing black speakers, and judges can misinterpret the meaning of black speech in cases.

==== Hispanic Americans and linguicism ====
Another form of linguicism is evidenced by the following: in some parts of the United States, a person who has a strong Spanish accent and uses only simple English words may be thought of as poor, poorly educated, and possibly an undocumented immigrant. However, if the same person has a diluted accent or no noticeable accent at all and can use a myriad of words in complex sentences, they are likely to be perceived as more successful, better educated, and a "legitimate citizen". Accent has two parts, the speaker and the listener. Thus, some people may perceive an accent as strong because they are not used to hearing them and the emphasis is on an unexpected syllable or as soft and imperceptible. The bias and discrimination that ensues is tied to the difficulty the listener has in understanding that accent. The fact that the person uses a very broad vocabulary creates even more cognitive dissonance on the part of the listener who will immediately think of the speaker as either undocumented, poor, uneducated or even insulting to their intelligence.

- Mock Spanish: Mock Spanish is a loaded term, introduced by Socialinguist Jane Hill, used to describe a variety of Spanish-inspired phrases used by speakers of English. It includes the English accent used when speaking Spanish and the modification of Spanish phrases. For a majority of instances, Mock Spanish intentionally changes the original meaning in order to create a sense of mocking and derogation. The Puerto Ricans are concerned whether they have an accent in speaking Spanish. However, Americans may have less concern or pay less attention to their accent when speaking Spanish, sometimes speaking Spanish in exaggerated American accent. Although short training will allow Americans to speak in a more original accent, people refuse to do so, and instead intentionally maintain this attitude toward Spanish. Furthermore, people would mix English with Spanish and modify standard Spanish to create jokes. For example, "hasta mañana" is modified to "hasta banana." Another example is "No problemo" while "problemo" is not a word in Spanish. This is considered an inappropriate joke that shows linguistic racism to Spanish. Many Spanish speakers reflect that Mock Spanish is offensive. Jane Hill believes that the intentional jocular and disrespectful accents and modifications represent "elevation of whiteness" and direct racism. Since white people consider Spanish-speaking people to be lower in social status, they refuse to respect the language.

==== Asians ====
Linguistic discrimination against Asians is still a topic understudied. A scholar in a paper included a short story where an Asian reporter was asked whether she can speak English every time she meets a stranger. Everyone assumed that she may not understand English because she had an Asian appearance. In a Pew Research study done in 2022, they found that around 59% of Asian immigrants could speak fluent English. The proportion is much lower for new immigrants. However, this low English literacy level and lack of translation discourages many Asian immigrants to obtain access to social services, such as health care. Asian immigrants, especially younger students, experience a language barrier. They are forced to learn a new language.

Chinglish is a common point of attack. It is the mixture of Chinese phrases or grammar and English that encompasses the way Chinese immigrants speak, often accompanied by a Chinese accent. An example would be "Open the light," since "open" and "turn on" are the same word ("开") in Chinese. Another example would be "Yes, I have." This is the literal translation from Chinese to English, and it is hard for Chinese people to learn this quickly. Speaking Chinglish may result in racial discrimination, while this is only the nuance between Chinese and English grammar.

==== American Sign Language users ====
Users of American Sign Language (ASL) have faced linguistic discrimination based on the perception of the legitimacy of signed languages compared to spoken languages. This attitude was explicitly expressed in the Milan Conference of 1880 which set precedence for public opinion of manual forms of communication, including ASL, creating lasting consequences for members of the Deaf community. The conference almost unanimously (save a handful of allies such as Thomas Hopkins Gallaudet), reaffirmed the use of oralism, instruction conducted exclusively in spoken language, as the preferred education method for Deaf individuals. These ideas were outlined in eight resolutions which ultimately resulted in the removal of Deaf individuals from their own educational institutions, leaving generations of Deaf persons to be educated single-handedly by hearing individuals.

Due to misconceptions about ASL, it was not recognized as its own, fully functioning language until recently. In the 1960s, linguist William Stokoe proved ASL to be its own language based on its unique structure and grammar, separate from that of English. Before this, ASL was thought to be merely a collection of gestures used to represent English. Because of its use of visual space, it was mistakenly believed that its users are of a lesser mental capacity. The misconception that ASL users are incapable of complex thought was prevalent, although this has decreased as further studies about its recognition of a language have taken place. For example, ASL users faced overwhelming discrimination for the supposedly "lesser" language that they use and were met with condescension especially when using their language in public. Another way discrimination against ASL is evident is how, despite research conducted by linguists like Stokoe or Clayton Valli and Cecil Lucas of Gallaudet University, ASL is not always recognized as a language. Its recognition is crucial both for those learning ASL as an additional language, and for prelingually-deaf children who learn ASL as their first language. Linguist Sherman Wilcox concludes that given that it has a body of literature and international scope, to single ASL out as unsuitable for a foreign language curriculum is inaccurate. Russel S. Rosen also writes about government and academic resistance to acknowledging ASL as a foreign language at the high school or college level, which Rosen believes often resulted from a lack of understanding about the language. Rosen and Wilcox's conclusions both point to discrimination ASL users face regarding its status as a language, that although decreasing over time is still present.

In the medical community, there is immense bias against deafness and ASL. This stems from the belief that spoken languages are superior to sign languages. Because 90% of deaf babies are born to hearing parents, who are usually unaware of the existence of the Deaf community, they often turn to the medical community for guidance. Medical and audiological professionals, who are typically biased against sign languages, encourage parents to get a cochlear implant for their deaf child in order for the child to use spoken language. Research shows, however, that deaf kids without cochlear implants acquire ASL with much greater ease than deaf kids with cochlear implants acquire spoken English. In addition, medical professionals discourage parents from teaching ASL to their deaf kid to avoid compromising their English although research shows that learning ASL does not interfere with a child's ability to learn English. In fact, the early acquisition of ASL proves to be useful to the child in learning English later on. When making a decision about cochlear implantation, parents are not properly educated about the benefits of ASL or the Deaf Community. This is seen by many members of the Deaf Community as cultural and linguistic genocide.

=== In Africa ===
- Anglophone Cameroonians: the central Cameroonian government has pushed francophonization in the English-speaking regions of the country despite constitutional stipulations on bilingualism. Measures include appointing French-speaking teachers and judges (in regions with Common Law) despite local opposition. However, Anglophones in Cameroon are not all those who have English as their first official language, as opposed to those who speak French as their first official language. As stated by Professor Simo Bobda (2001), Anglophony in Cameroon is more an ethnic, cultural and regional concept than a linguistic one. This definition excludes Francophones who have been settled for a long time in the English-speaking area, even if they have property and ties there. This analysis also excludes Francophones who master English because they have acquired an Anglo-Saxon education, or studied in establishments of the Anglophone subsystem which proliferate in the Francophone zone. Clearly, the Anglophones of Cameroon are indeed a very particular cultural identity, a limited geographical space and a specific historical course, before being a simple linguistic community. With this preliminary clarification, we can better understand the nature and contours of the English-speaking problem which today is raising socio-political tension in the South-West and North-West regions of the country.
- South Africa: Carolyn McKinley is highly critical of the language policy in the South African educational system, which she describes as 'anglonormatif', because the increasing anglicisation becomes 'normative' in the education system. The universities of Pretoria, Free State and Unisa want to anglicise completely.

=== In the Middle East ===
- At the turn of the eighth century, the Umayyad caliph Abd al-Malik ibn Marwan decreed that Arabic would replace Medieval Greek and the Coptic language as the administrative language of the empire. Coptic gradually declined within a few hundred years and suffered violent persecutions, especially under the Mamluke Sultanate of Cairo, leading to its virtual extinction by the 17th century.
- The Kurdish languages are under pressure in many countries where they are spoken. Publishing materials in Kurdish in Syria is forbidden, though this prohibition is not enforced any more due to the Syrian civil war. Until 2002, Turkey placed severe restrictions on the use of Kurdish, including a ban on its use in education and broadcast media. Many mayors were tried for issuing public documents in the Kurdish language. The Kurdish alphabet is not recognized in Turkey, and prior to 2013 the use of Kurdish names containing the letters Q, W, and X, which do not exist in the Turkish alphabet, was not allowed. Turkey began to allow private television channels to broadcast in Kurdish on a limited basis in 2006, with most restrictions lifted by 2009. The state-run Turkish Radio and Television Corporation (TRT) started its 24-hour Kurdish television station in 2009, with full use of the letters Q, W, and X. In 2010, Kurdish municipalities in the southeast began printing marriage certificates, water bills, construction and road signs, as well as emergency, social and cultural notices in Kurdish alongside Turkish. Also, Imams began to deliver Friday sermons in Kurdish and Esnaf price tags in Kurdish. In 2012, Kurdish-language lessons became an elective subject in public schools. Previously, Kurdish education had only been possible in private institutions.

=== In Asia ===
- During the time when Korea was under Japanese rule from 1910 to 1945, the Japanese government forced Korean people to learn and speak Japanese. They were forced to take Japanese names and the order of names in Japanese. In 1911, the Joseon Education Decree was enacted. The Joseon Education Decree is interpreted to have the purpose of obliterating all Korean cultural and spiritual independence to keep Koreans permanently colonized. Japanese was required to teach in schools.
- Anti-Chinese legislation in Indonesia
- The brutality and linguicism against Tamils in Sri Lanka which took thousands of Tamil lives because of their language. This was rooted from "The Sinhala Only Act", formerly the Official Language Act No. 33 of 1956, that was passed in the Parliament of Ceylon in 1956. Black July was the peak of the violence against Tamils in 1983.
- China: In the 2000s the Chinese government began promoting the use of Mandarin Chinese in areas where Cantonese is spoken. Cantonese is the traditionally dominant language in Guangdong, Hong Kong and nearby regions, and Mandarin is the official language of China. Chinese government intended to advocate inter-regional communication by educating Mandarin rather than in Cantonese throughout the country. In 2010 this gave rise to the Guangzhou Television Cantonese controversy. Guangzhou Television once proposed that all television program were to be in Mandarin rather than in Cantonese. This has also been a point of contention with Hong Kong, which is within the traditional ethnic Cantonese homeland. Cantonese has become a means of asserting Hong Kong's political identity as separate from mainland China. The Chinese government has implemented similar controversial language repression policies throughout regions such as Southern China, Tibet, and Xinjiang
- After the Kuomintang retreated to Taiwan following the Chinese Civil War, the Nationalist government promoted Mandarin and banned the public use of Taiwanese and other native languages as part of a deliberate political and cultural repression, especially in schools and broadcast media. In 1964 use of Taiwanese in schools or official settings was forbidden, and transgression in schools punished with beatings, fines and humiliation. This discrimination started to decrease and ended when martial law ended in 1987.
- Bengali language movement occurred in a move to recognise Bengali as an official language in the then-Dominion of Pakistan of 1947.
- Kannada supremacism widely known as "activism" is common in Karnataka and enjoys political support. It forces all residents including those from outside Karnataka to speak Kannada.
- Marathi superamacy in Maharashtra (mainly Mumbai) perpuated by ultranationalist regional nativist parties like Shiv Sena and MNS which labelled immigrants as 'job stealers' and 'outsiders', with South Indian Kannadigas and Tuluvas becoming the target of Bal Thackeray's racist slurs and attack by Marathi goons who prided on their 'Marathi Manoos' status. Subsequently, Bihari, Gujarati and other North Indian communities were targeted and attacked resulting in an exodus in 2008. Till date, there have been sporadic attacks and discrimination towards non-Marathi communities in Mumbai.
- Imposition of Hindi by the Indian Government on non-Hindi speaking states, especially that of South India has led to anti Hindi agitations in states like Karnataka and Tamil Nadu. The prioritization of Hindi in non-Hindi speaking states has led to discrimination towards people who do not know Hindi.
- In south Asia, more than 800 languages are spoken, while only about 40% of them have language education. Linguistic minorities do not have same education opportunities.
- Pakistan has more than 60 languages existing in its territory. There are a total of six major languages which are Urdu, Punjabi, Pushto, Sindhi, Balochi, and Hindko. All of them have an ethnolinguistic group. Currently, these large ethnolinguistic groups are demanding a separate province based on languages.

=== Texts ===
Linguicism applies to written, spoken, or signed languages. The quality of a book or article may be judged by the language in which it is written. In the scientific community, for example, those who evaluated a text in two language versions, English and the national Scandinavian language, rated the English-language version as being of higher scientific content.

The Internet operates a great deal using written language. Readers of a web page, Usenet group, forum post, or chat session may be more inclined to take the author seriously if the language is written in accordance with the standard language.

=== Prejudice ===
In contrast to the previous examples of linguistic prejudice, linguistic discrimination involves the actual treatment of individuals based on use of language. Examples may be clearly seen in the workplace, in marketing, and in education systems. For example, some workplaces enforce an English-only policy, which is part of an American political movement that pushes for English to be accepted as the official language. In the United States, the federal law, Titles VI and VII of the Civil Rights Act of 1964 protects non-native speakers from discrimination in the workplace based on their national origin or use of dialect. There are state laws which also address the protection of non-native speakers, such as the California Fair Employment and Housing Act. However, industries often argue in retrospect that clear, understandable English is often needed in specific work settings in the U.S.

== See also ==
- Colonialingualism
- Cultural assimilation
- Cultural genocide
- Economics of language
- Global language system
- Glottopolitics
- Historic recurrence
- Humanitism
- Interlinguistics
- Language death
- Language ideology
- Linguistic insecurity
- Linguistic prescription
- Linguistic profiling
- Linguistic racism
- Minoritized language
- Monolingualism
- Nonstandard dialect
- Raciolinguistics
- Schizoglossia
- Standard language ideology

== Literature ==
- Skutnabb-Kangas et al. (eds.), Linguistic human rights: overcoming linguistic discrimination, Walter de Gruyter (1995), ISBN 3-11-014878-1.
- R. Wodak and D. Corson (eds.), Language policy and political issues in education, Springer, ISBN 0-7923-4713-7.
