= Foreign language anxiety =

Unease when using a foreign language

Foreign language anxiety, also known as xenoglossophobia, is the feeling of unease, worry, nervousness and apprehension experienced in learning or using a second or foreign language. The feelings may stem from any second language context whether it is associated with the productive skills of speaking and writing or the receptive skills of reading and listening.

Research has shown that foreign language anxiety is a significant problem in language classrooms throughout the world especially in terms of its strong relationship to the skill of speaking in a foreign or second language. It is a form of what psychologists describe as a specific anxiety reaction. Some individuals are more predisposed to anxiety than others and may feel anxious in a wide variety of situations. Foreign language anxiety, however, is situation-specific and so it can also affect individuals who are not characteristically anxious in other situations. Its main causes are communication-apprehension, test anxiety, and fear of negative evaluation. There is also a psychological component to foreign language anxiety.

While foreign language anxiety was traditionally viewed as a purely debilitating factor that hinders performance, recent scholarship has adopted a more complex view. Including the role of "facilitating anxiety" (which can motivate learners) and the integration of positive psychology concepts, such as Foreign Language Enjoyment. With the rise of digital learning, research has also expanded to examine how anxiety manifests differently in online environments and interactions with artificial intelligence tools.

Additionally, it has a variety of detrimental effects on foreign language performance, but both the student and the teacher can adopt strategies to minimize the anxiety.

== Causes ==
Although all aspects of using and learning a foreign language can cause anxiety, both listening and speaking are regularly cited as the most anxiety provoking of foreign language activities. Foreign language anxiety is usually studied and seen in a language classroom environment, as this is where many students start learning a new language and develop a fear of embarrassment.

General theories of anxiety can help explain the root of foreign language anxiety. The following theories of anxiety play a role in describing foreign language anxiety:

- Self-efficacy and appraisal: An anxiety reaction first depends on the individual's appraisal of how threatening a situation is. In the case of a perceived threatening situation, the amount of anxiety then depends on the individual's perception of their self-efficacy, or their confidence in their ability to effectively control the situation. Potential negative events that individuals do not believe they are equipped to handle often lead to anxiety. In terms of foreign language learning, appraisals of foreign language situations are seen as threatening with self-deprecating thoughts about an individual's language ability, which decreases their self-efficacy leading to foreign language anxiety:
- State, trait, and situational anxiety: Anxiety can be classified into trait anxiety, state anxiety, and the more recent distinction of situation-specific anxiety. Individuals with trait anxiety have chronic, persisting anxiety in all situations, whereas individuals with state anxiety are only anxious in particular situations. When applied to learning a language, this theory results in the additional distinction of situation-specific anxiety, which builds on state anxiety to describe a particular situation that induces anxiety only when specific conditions (e.g. a foreign language) are at play.

An example of when foreign language anxiety may occur would be in a classroom. The causes of foreign language anxiety have been broadly separated into three main components: communication apprehension, test anxiety and fear of negative evaluation. Communication apprehension is the anxiety experienced when speaking or listening to other individuals. Test-anxiety is a form of performance anxiety, that is associated with the fear of doing badly or failing altogether. Fear of negative evaluation is the anxiety associated with the learner's perception of how other onlookers (instructors, classmates or others) may negatively view their language ability. These three factors cause an increase of an individual's anxiety levels as well as a decrease in self-efficacy. In addition, specifically in an ESL classroom, students learning a foreign language out of their country are very vulnerable to high levels of anxiety pertaining to language learning. For they perceive more social distance between themselves and the native individuals of the target language, which as a result may cause them to experience a language shock.

Sparks and Ganschow draw attention to the fact that anxiety could result in or cause poor language learning. If a student is unable to study before a language examination, the student could experience test anxiety. Context anxiety could be viewed as a result. In contrast, anxiety becomes a cause of poor language learning, leading that student to then be unable to adequately learn the target language.

There is a psychological component to foreign language anxiety as well; language learning is a "profoundly unsettling psychological proposition" as it jeopardizes an individual's self-understanding and perspective. It stems from one's self-perceptions of language ability. Foreign language anxiety is rooted in three psychological challenges:

- performance difficulty
- threat to one's image
- identity conflict

Those psychological states thus have task-performance and identity dimensions. People tend to act or speak in a way that would be judged appropriate to the other people native to the foreign culture, but the behavior that individuals are producing grapples with ingrained values and behaviors. Emotions by the psychological challenges has something to do with attempting to switch codes in an interactive encounter.

=== Neurobiological correlates ===
Research suggests that foreign language anxiety operates through neurobiological pathways similar to social anxiety, though its manifestations are context-specific. Functional magnetic resonance imaging (fMRI) studies indicate that anxiety during second-language processing correlates with hyperactivity in the amygdala, a region central to threat detection. This heightened emotional arousal can inhibit the dorsolateral prefrontal cortex, effectively disrupting the executive functions required for language planning and vocabulary retrieval. Such neural interference provides a physiological explanation for the "mental block" frequently reported by anxious learners.

The physiological stress response also plays a critical role. Comparative studies of bilingual speakers have observed significantly higher cortisol concentrations during second-language production than during native-language speech. Elevated cortisol is known to impede hippocampal function, which is vital for long-term memory access. This creates a bio-behavioral feedback loop: physiological stress impairs linguistic recall, which in turn makes the learner's performance anxiety even worse.

Furthermore, electrophysiological research (EEG) has identified frontal alpha asymmetry as a biomarker for this anxiety. Anxious learners often demonstrate increased activation in the right frontal hemisphere relative to the left. Given that the left hemisphere typically governs language production and approach behaviors, a shift toward right-sided dominance signals a neural tendency for withdrawal, conflicting with the communicative demands of the language task.

=== Cognitive mechanisms ===
Cognitive models of anxiety, such as those proposed by Tobias (1986) and MacIntyre and Gardner (1994), suggest that anxiety interferes with language learning at three specific stages: input, processing, and output.

- Input stage: This is the initial phase where learners encounter new information, such as listening to a teacher or reading a text. Anxiety acts as a distraction that disrupts attention. If a student is too worried about missing a detail, they may fail to encode the linguistic cues properly, leading to a sensation of the mind "going blank."
- Processing stage: The learner attempts to organize and understand the material. Research indicates that anxiety takes up cognitive capacity in working memory, leaving fewer resources for the central executive to handle complex grammar or vocabulary. As a result, anxious learners often take longer to grasp new rules compared to their relaxed peers.
- Output stage: This involves the production of language, such as speaking or writing. Anxiety at this stage can block the retrieval of information from long-term memory. Even if a student knows the answer, anxiety may cause "freezing," stuttering, or tip-of-the-tongue moments, forcing them to use simpler sentences than they are actually capable of constructing.

These stages are interconnected. If anxiety blocks information at the input or processing stages, the student will naturally struggle with output. This implies that a student's silence may not simply be a fear of speaking, but a result of not having processed the input due to earlier anxiety.

=== Social and cultural mechanisms ===
Beyond individual psychology and biology, foreign language anxiety is frequently triggered by the social and cultural context in which learning occurs. Societal power dynamics, minority status, and cultural expectations act as external stressors that can lead to anxious reactions.

==== Stereotype and identity ====
The phenomenon known as stereotype threat, occurs when a learner worries that their mistakes will confirm negative beliefs about their social group. For students from marginalized backgrounds, anxiety may rise not because of a lack of skill, but due to the extra pressure of feeling they must disprove assumptions about their group's intelligence. This is closely linked to what Guiora (1972) called language ego. Since language is a core part of personal identity, speaking a new language can feel like a threat to one's sense of self, causing the learner to put up defensive emotional barriers.

==== Diglossia and linguistic insecurity ====
In societies where a minority language exists alongside a dominant one (a situation known as diglossia), anxiety often comes from political or social tension rather than classroom tests. Speakers of minority languages may experience "linguistic insecurity," worrying that using their native tongue marks them as having lower social status. In this context, the anxiety is not about personal incompetence, but stems from the external threat of verbal aggression or a lack of legal protection in public spaces.

==== Gender expectations ====
Cultural rules about gender also shape anxiety. While studies show mixed results on whether men or women are generally more anxious, the reasons for their anxiety often differ based on social expectations. In cultures that expect women to be "polite" and "proper," female learners may feel more pressure to speak without errors. On the other hand, in contexts where language learning is culturally viewed as a "feminine" activity, male learners may feel anxious because the activity conflicts with their traditional gender identity.

== Effects ==
While foreign language anxiety is often portrayed as a wholly negative phenomenon that impairs learners' confidence and performance, scholarly research offers a more nuanced view. In the literature, anxiety is frequently divided into two distinct types: debilitating anxiety and facilitating anxiety.

Debilitating anxiety stimulates avoidance behavior and disrupts cognitive processing. Learners experiencing this type of anxiety often adopt "escape" strategies, such as skipping classes or remaining silent to avoid negative evaluation. It is associated with the classic "fight or flight" response, where cognitive resources are diverted away from language learning tasks toward managing the emotional threat.

Conversely, facilitating anxiety functions as a motivational tool. Drawing on the framework established by Alpert and Haber (1960) and the Yerkes-Dodson law, a moderate level of arousal can enhance alertness and focus. For instance, a student may feel anxious about an upcoming exam, but instead of freezing, they channel this energy into extra preparation and increased attention to detail. Research suggests that facilitating anxiety is more common among advanced learners who possess higher self-efficacy, allowing them to perceive the anxiety as a challenge to be overcome rather than a threat to their identity.

The effects of foreign language anxiety are particularly evident in the foreign language classroom, and anxiety is a strong indicator of academic performance. Anxiety is found to have a detrimental effect on students' confidence, self-esteem and level of participation.

Anxious learners suffer detrimental effects during spontaneous speaking activities in performance, affective reactions and their overall attitudes towards learning their target second language. Furthermore, they may lack confidence, be less able to self-edit and identify language errors and more likely to employ avoidance strategies such as skipping class. Anxious students also forget previously learned material, volunteer less and tend to be more passive in classroom activities than their less anxious classmates.

The effects of foreign language anxiety also extend outside the second language classroom. A high level of foreign language anxiety may also correspond with communication apprehension, causing individuals to be quieter and less willing to communicate. People who exhibit this kind of communication reticence can also sometimes be perceived as less trustworthy, less competent, less socially and physically attractive, tenser, less composed and less dominant than their less reticent counterparts.

In addition to communication apprehension, research highlights a strong linkage between foreign language anxiety and learners' willingness to communicate. For example, a study of Chinese EFL undergraduate learners by Liu and Jackson (2008) found that foreign language anxiety was a powerful predictor of students' unwillingness to communicate, particularly in classroom settings where the risk of negative evaluation is high.

The researchers observed that anxiety correlated significantly with self-perceived proficiency: students who felt less competent were more anxious and less willing to speak. In this context, anxiety functions like an affective filter: when the anxiety threshold is high, learners often suppress their communicative intent and opt for silence, regardless of the actual opportunity to speak. This suggests that reducing anxiety is as critical as improving linguistic skills for fostering active engagement.

=== Cross-cultural code-switching and behavioral adaptation ===
The impact of foreign language anxiety extends beyond linguistic production to include cross-cultural code-switching, defined in organizational psychology as the purposeful modification of non-verbal behavior and interaction styles to accommodate foreign cultural norms. Unlike linguistic code-switching which involves alternating between languages, this form of switching requires learners to adopt foreign behaviors (such as directness, eye contact, or physical proximity) that may conflict with their native cultural values.

Organizational behavior scholar Andrew Molinsky assumes that the pressure to adapt behaviorally creates specific psychological stressors. Learners often experience identity conflict, feeling that the new behaviors are inauthentic, fearing the inability to execute the behaviors correctly. These internal conflicts serve as primary causes for anxiety. When the discrepancy between a learner's native norms and the target culture's expectations is too high, the resulting anxiety can lead to avoidance behaviors or a refusal to switch cultural codes, inhibiting effective communication.

Distinct from behavioral adaptation, anxiety also precipitates linguistic code-switching (reverting to the native language) as a coping mechanism. Research in Second Language Acquisition (SLA) identifies L1 usage as a common "safety valve" for anxious students. When learners perceive a communication task as threatening or when cognitive processing is overwhelmed by anxiety, they may unconsciously switch to their native language to regain control and reduce emotional tension. In this context, code-switching is not necessarily a sign of low proficiency, but a strategic regulation of affect, allowing the learner to relieve the "face threat" associated with potential errors in the target language.

== Contemporary Research Perspectives ==
Since the 2010s, research into foreign language anxiety has shifted away from static, purely negative definitions toward multidimensional and dynamic models. Two primary theoretical developments dominate recent scholarship: the integration of positive psychology and the application of Complex Dynamic Systems Theory (CDST).

=== Positive psychology and emotional balance ===
Historically, Second Language Acquisition (SLA) research focused almost exclusively on anxiety as a debilitating factor to be eliminated. The "positive turn" in psychology has prompted scholars to re-examine anxiety not in isolation, but in relation to positive emotions such as Foreign Language Enjoyment (FLE).

Dewaele and MacIntyre (2014) assume that anxiety and enjoyment are not opposite ends of a single spectrum but independent dimensions. Consequently, learners may experience high anxiety and high enjoyment simultaneously—for example, during a challenging task that they find personally meaningful. This relationship is critical for pedagogy; rather than focusing only on anxiety reduction (a defensive approach), researchers argue that boosting enjoyment can broaden a learner's cognitive resources, building resilience that helps them tolerate inevitable moments of anxiety.

=== Dynamic nature of anxiety ===
While early studies often treated anxiety as a stable personality trait (trait anxiety), contemporary research increasingly views it through Complex Dynamic Systems Theory (CDST). In this framework, anxiety is defined as a fluctuating emotional state that changes on multiple timescales, from month-to-month development down to second-by-second variations during a single conversation.

Methodologies such as the "idiodynamic method" have allowed researchers to map these rapid fluctuations. Studies indicate that a learner's anxiety can spike or drop instantly in response to specific triggers, such as the interlocutor's social status, the complexity of the topic, or non-verbal feedback. The perspective challenges the categorization of students as simply "anxious" or "relaxed", and suggests that anxiety is an emergent property of the specific interaction rather than a fixed attribute of the learner.

== Measures ==
Most research on foreign language anxiety uses self-report questionnaires. The most widely cited is the Foreign Language Classroom Anxiety Scale (FLCAS), developed by Horwitz, Horwitz, and Cope in 1986. The FLCAS contains 33 items rated on a 5-point scale and has been used in hundreds of studies across different countries.

The scale measures three types of anxiety: fear of communication, test anxiety, and fear of negative evaluation. However, factor analysis studies have produced inconsistent results, with some researchers finding different underlying dimensions depending on the cultural context.

Later researchers developed scales for specific language skills. Saito, Horwitz, and Garza (1999) created a reading anxiety scale after observing that some students felt anxious about reading even when comfortable with speaking. Elkhafaifi (2005) developed a listening anxiety measure, and Cheng (2004) introduced a writing anxiety inventory that separated physiological symptoms from cognitive worry.

These instruments have been criticized for relying solely on self-report data, which may be influenced by social desirability bias.

== Reduction and management ==
The reduction of foreign language anxiety necessitates the involvement of both the student and the teacher, each of which are able to adopt strategies to mitigate anxiety.

=== Students ===
Students play an active role in acknowledging and managing their foreign language anxiety. The first step of recognizing and acknowledging the anxiety is needed in order to communicate their needs with their teacher and more effectively reach a strategy for reducing their anxiety. Specifically recognizing what types of foreign language activities induce their anxiety and what their personal language style is also helps as a first step in controlling the anxiety. From there, the student can seek help and support. Recommended personal strategies for reducing foreign language anxiety include joining language clubs, journal writing, positive self-talk, and in general taking advantage of any opportunities to use the language. Support groups can also be a useful tool, as well as other forms of collaboration among peers at a similar level of experience with the language.

Beyond behavioral strategies, the development of emotional intelligence(EI) has been identified as a significant internal resource for managing anxiety. Research involving EFL learners indicates that those with higher EI are better equipped to perceive and regulate their negative emotions during the learning process.

A study by Yu, Shao, and Xiang (2015) found that EI acts as a buffer between anxiety and academic performance. That is, students with strong emotional regulation skills can prevent their anxiety from becoming a debilitating barrier to proficiency.

=== Teachers ===
Teachers can also adopt strategies and teaching methods that can help prevent foreign language anxiety to their students. Teaching-based strategies for reducing foreign language anxiety involve fostering a comfortable and relaxed classroom environment in which the teacher is supportive and friendly. Focusing on positive reinforcement and normalizing mistakes rather than focusing on the negative errors can help create an ideal classroom environment. For instance, teachers can adopt a "modeling approach" in which, instead of explicitly correcting errors in front of everyone in the class, the teacher repeats the utterance back to the student, but with the errors fixed. Specific strategies that teachers can use in the classroom include playing language games, conducting grammar language in the native language instead of the target language, leading group activities, and facilitating discussions of anxiety. This would allow students to document and recognize their own anxiety as well as understand that other students may feel the same way. Offering additional help outside of class can also be helpful.

One study recommends teaching songs in the classroom as a specific methodological strategy that can improve academic performance, which in turn decreases the anxiety level of students as they become more comfortable and proficient in the language. The study found that this tool is most beneficial to those with high anxiety.

The flipped classroom model presents a unique case for anxiety management. In EFL contexts, researchers have found that this method cuts two ways. On the positive side, the pre-class phase allows students to digest materials at their own pace, which effectively lowers the stress of keeping up with new information (input anxiety). But the classroom component brings its own challenges. Since class time is dedicated almost entirely to active interaction, students often face higher pressure to speak spontaneously (output anxiety). Simply flipping the classroom isn't enough; instructors need to structure in-class tasks carefully so that the pressure to perform doesn't outweigh the benefits of self-paced study.

Studies indicates that students learn a language when teachers and students converse with one another in a certain way. This is seen from a sociocultural viewpoint, that is, they think that we don't learn a language only from books, but by talking to other people (such as the teacher).This will reduce anxiety and help you reach out to others for assistance when learning a new language.

=== Psychotherapeutic interventions ===
Researchers have explored clinical psychology methods to address foreign language anxiety at its source. Gregersen and MacIntyre (2014) proposed using cognitive behavioral therapy (CBT) techniques to help learners identify and challenge counterproductive thoughts about language performance. In their model, learners work to recognize automatic negative thoughts, such as catastrophizing about errors, and also develop more balanced interpretations. This process is also called cognitive restructuring, and targets the internal beliefs that may amplify anxiety before physical symptoms appear.

Mindfulness practices have also received attention in recent studies. Defined as the non-judgmental awareness of the present moment, mindfulness helps separate the feeling of anxiety from the reaction to it. Empirical studies indicate that mindfulness training significantly lowers foreign language anxiety by reducing the cognitive interference caused by worry, thus to gether the attentional resources for language processing. Mindfulness has also been found to directly enhance a learner's Willingness to Communicate (WTC); by fostering a mindset of acceptance, learners become less fixated on potential errors and more focused on the communicative purpose of the interaction.

== Anxiety in digital environments ==
With the shift towards digital and blended learning, researchers have found that the online context changes the dynamics of anxiety. A key factor here is anonymity. When learners use pseudonyms or digital avatars, they often report a lower fear of negative evaluation compared to traditional face-to-face classrooms.

Scholars describe this digital context as a protective "buffer." Because it removes many of the immediate social cues that trigger embarrassment, highly anxious learners are often more willing to take linguistic risks and engage in communication practice than they would be in a physical classroom.

The transition to online settings fundamentally alters the anxiety landscape for language learners. Evidence suggests that digital platforms can act as a buffer against face-to-face performance pressure; however, this social relief often gives way to anxiety related to the medium itself. Researchers observed that while students reported feeling less judged in online classes, their focus shifted to technical impediments. Concerns about software management and the absence of paralinguistic cues emerged as significant barriers to engagement, effectively replacing performance anxiety with technological frustration.

While general online platforms may cause technical stress, AI-mediated interaction has emerged as a distinct, low-anxiety alternative. Research involving EFL undergraduates indicates that frequent interaction with generative AI is significantly associated with lower anxiety levels. Unlike synchronous communication with human peers, AI tools function as non-judgmental conversational partners.This 'low-stakes' environment allows learners to practice without the interpersonal risks typically tied to real-time performance. Students are most likely to experience this emotional buffer when they view the AI interface as both useful and easy to navigate. Technical familiarity remains a prerequisite for anxiety relief.

== See also ==
- Schizoglossia – Linguistic insecurity about one's native language
- Linguistic insecurity – Lack of confidence about one's way of speaking
