= Schizoglossia =

Linguistic insecurity about one's native language

Schizoglossia refers to linguistic insecurity or language complex about one's native language. The term was coined by Einar Haugen in 1962.

Linguistic insecurity is common in societies where there are two language varieties and one is seen as "incorrect" and the other as a prestigious standard idiom. For example: Standard French versus Haitian creole or Standard American English versus Afro-American English. In these cases, one variety is seen as "bad" and its speaker might want to "correct" some usages for some more prestigious alternatives. Those negative attitudes usually make the speakers ashamed of language usage that does not convey prestige, either openly or indirectly by using linguistic characteristics, such as pronunciation, of the other speech variety.

== See also ==
- Linguistic discrimination – Discrimination on the basis of language of an individual
- Standard language ideology – Concept of language having or being influenced by ideology
- Foreign language anxiety – Unease when using a foreign language

== Related reading ==
- Einar Haugen (1972) The Ecology of Language (Stanford University Press)
