= Minoritized language =

Language that is marginalized, persecuted or banned

In sociolinguistics, a minoritized language is a language that is marginalized, persecuted, or banned. Language minoritization stems from the tendency of large nations to establish a common language for commerce and government, or to establish homogeneity for ideological reasons. Minoritized languages are typically restricted to a smaller range of language domains than dominant languages, and frequently one-way bilingualism develops when speakers of minoritized languages learn the dominant language, but not vice versa. Speakers of minoritized languages may face various consequences, including reduced educational achievement and language shift in favor of the dominant language.

== Minority vs. minoritized ==
A minoritized language differs from a minority language, which means a language used by a small number of speakers, or alternately to a language with lesser numerical or political power in a given context. There are cases in which a language is minoritized while being spoken by a majority of the population, such as some indigenous languages during the colonization of Africa, when colonial languages were favored. Spanish is the dominant language in Latin America, where local indigenous languages are minoritized. The term "minoritized" is sometimes used in preference to "minority language" because it draws attention to the power differential between languages.

== "Western language ideology" ==
Nancy Dorian, Kathryn A. Davis, and Prem Phyak have argued that there is a "Western language ideology" which applies social Darwinism to linguistics. This ideology allegedly idealizes monolingualism, denies the benefits of multilingualism, and disdains non-standard language varieties. Because such non-standard varieties are labeled deficient, a hierarchy of languages is created. (Note: The prevailing view among contemporary linguists is that regardless of perceptions that a dialect or language is "better" or "worse" than its counterparts, when dialects and languages are assessed "on purely linguistic grounds, all languages—and all dialects—have equal merit".) Some authors have drawn a connection between anti-immigration sentiment, especially anti-German sentiment, and English-only education in the US.

In Europe, the process of minoritization, for example of the Celtic languages in Britain or the minority languages in France and Italy, was connected to the emergence of nationalist movements calling for the establishment of monolingual, monocultural nation-states in the nineteenth century. The process of minoritization often led to a language shift towards the hegemonic language.

== Characteristics of minoritization ==
The defining characteristic of minoritization is the existence of a power imbalance between it and the dominant language. One sign that a language is minoritized is if its speakers develop one-way bilingualism—they learn the dominant or prestige language, but speakers of the dominant language do not learn the minoritized language. Another frequent symptom of minoritization is the restriction of the language to a limited range of language domains. A language excluded from use in government and formal education might only be used at home and in social situations. Because of the above, speakers of the minoritized language became a subset of speakers of the dominant language; for instance, all speakers of Scottish Gaelic are also speakers of English, but most English speakers in Scotland do not speak Gaelic. Likewise, speakers of Sardinian find themselves in a relatively small minority compared to those of Italian, whose current predominance on the island is the result of policies aimed at the exclusion of the former and the stigmatization of the group identity embodied in its practice. In contrast, speakers of a dominant language can carry out all functions of daily life using their native language.

Speakers of the dominant language typically use the greater prestige of the dominant language to prevent speakers of the minoritized language from changing the situation to one more favorable to the minoritized language. For example, many "liberal" criticisms of language planning for minoritized language communities assert that intervention in favor of minoritized languages is equivalent to the policies that caused the language to become minoritized in the first place, such as linguistic legislation, elitism, exclusion of minoritized languages from formal education, and even forced population transfer.

== Consequences ==
In Engaged Language Policy and Practices, the authors cite three studies that have shown that students' academic achievement suffers if policies are implemented that minoritize their native language. Nancy Dorian has argued that the "Western language ideology" favoring monolingualism has fostered an "ideology of contempt" for minoritized languages. The process of minoritization can lead to language shift in favor of the dominant language.

== Examples ==
- In Russia, speakers of Ös and Tofa were ridiculed for or banned from speaking their languages.
- The Guarani language of Paraguay, although spoken by a majority of nationals, is seen as a clear example of minoritized language, due to the socioeconomic and political prevalence of Spanish. Organisations such as Yvy Marãe'ỹ are advocating against this trend.
- As of 2019, pupils in Guangdong province in China are punished if they speak their mother tongue, Cantonese. Public signs encourage people to use the central government's language Mandarin with these words: "Use civilized language – Be a civilized person.", implying that the local language is uncivilized.

== See also ==
- Diglossia
- Glottopolitics
- Linguistic discrimination
- Linguistic imperialism
- Institutionalized racism
