= Yvy Marãe'ỹ =

Paraguayan Guaraní advocacy organization

Yvy Marãeʼỹ
- Established: 2007
- Type: Cultural
- Headquarters: Calle San Lorenzo n.º 976; San Lorenzo (Paraguay)
- Website: http://www.yvymaraey.com.py

The Yvy Marãe'ỹ Foundation ([ɨˈʋɨ mãɾ̃ãẽˈʔɨ̃], English: Land without evil) is an institution which advocates for Guaraní language, its diffusion, teaching and research. It is headquartered in San Lorenzo, Paraguay.

It obtained its legal capacity in February 2007, per Decree No. 9184. Its vision is for a multilingual and intercultural Paraguayan society, promoting cultural and linguistic sovereignty, national identity, cultural and linguistic rights and social inclusion of all Paraguayans.

The Foundation organized three International Seminars on Translation, Terminology and Minoritized Languages in 2016, 2017, and 2018. They have published IT dictionaries and reports, and they are currently collaborating in the translation of Facebook and other websites.

The Yvy Marãeʼỹ Foundation is chaired by Miguel Ángel Verón, who in March 2018 signed an agreement with the Senate of Paraguay to facilitate Guarani interpreters and language trainers.

As of December 2023, the Foundation started publishing the academic journal Ñeʼẽ. Revista de Investigación Lingüística y Cultural.
