= Diglossia =

Community restriction of languages or dialects to specific settings

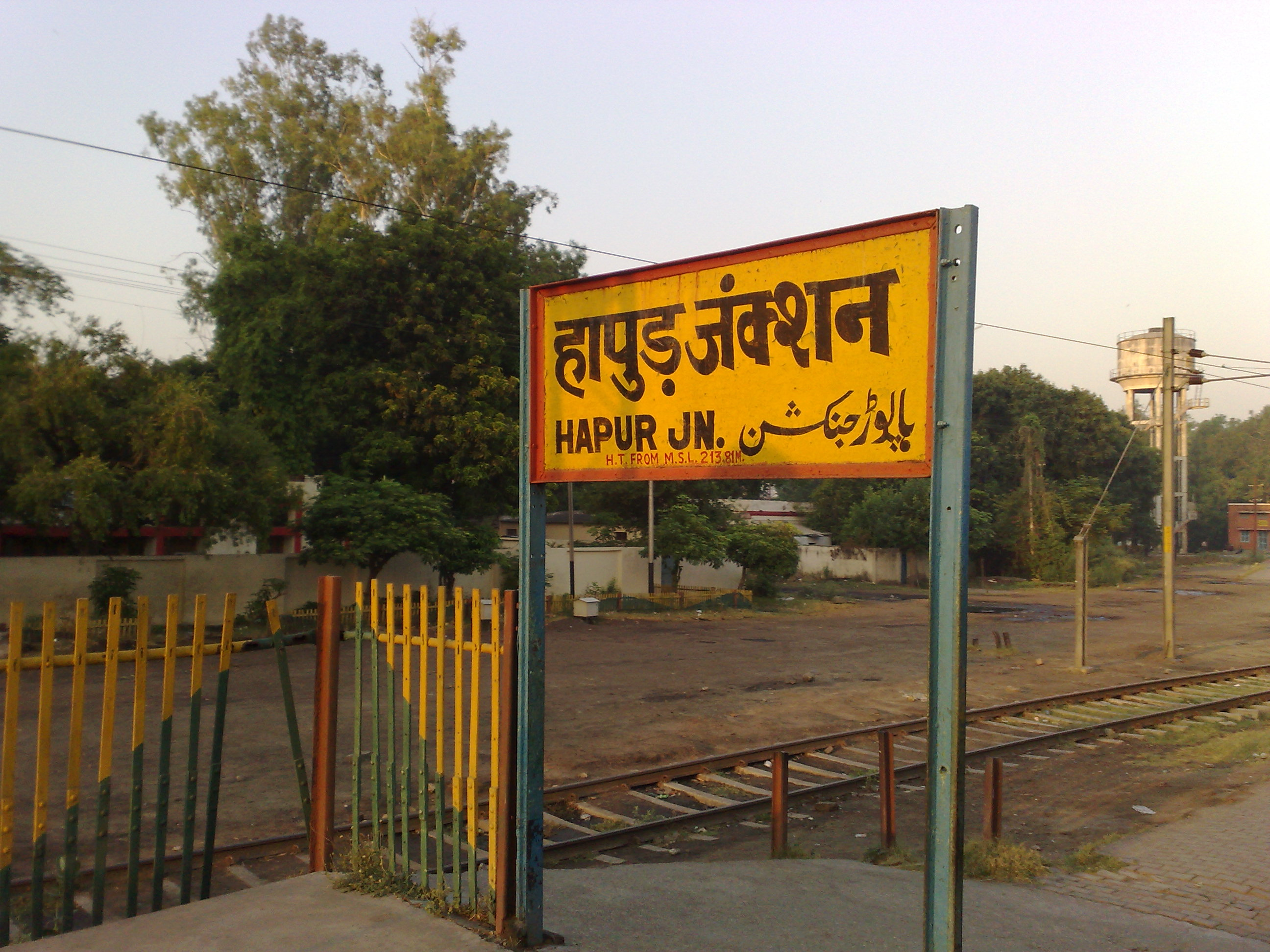
The station board of Hapur Junction railway station in North India demonstrating digraphia of two formal registers, Hindi and Urdu, of a common vernacular, Hindustani, an example of triglossia

In linguistics, diglossia (/daɪˈɡlɒsiə/ dy-GLOSS-ee-ə, US also /daɪˈɡlɔːsiə/ dy-GLAW-see-ə) is where two dialects or languages are used (in fairly strict compartmentalization) by a single language community. In addition to the community's everyday or vernacular language variety (labeled "L" or "low" variety), a second, highly codified lect (labeled "H" or "high") is used in certain situations such as literature, formal education, or other specific settings, but not used normally for ordinary conversation. The H variety may have no native speakers within the community. In cases of three dialects, the term triglossia is used. When referring to two writing systems coexisting for a single language, the term digraphia is used.

The high variety may be an older stage of the same language (as in medieval Europe, where Latin (H) remained in formal use even as colloquial speech (L) diverged), an unrelated language, or a distinct yet closely related present-day dialect. For example, northern India and Pakistan, where Hindustani (L) is used alongside the standard registers of Hindi (H) and Urdu (H); the German-speaking countries, where Standard German (H) is used alongside German dialects (L); the Arab world, where Modern Standard Arabic (H) is used alongside other varieties of Arabic (L); and China, where Standard Chinese (H) is used as the official, literary standard and local varieties of Chinese (L) are used in everyday communication); Tamil, a Dravidian language has one of the largest diglossia with Literary Tamil (H) used in formal settings and colloquial spoken Tamil (L) used in daily life. Other examples include literary Katharevousa (H) versus spoken Demotic Greek (L); Indonesian, with its bahasa baku (H) and bahasa gaul (L) forms; Standard American English (H) versus African-American Vernacular English or Hawaiian Pidgin (L); and literary (H) versus spoken (L) Welsh.

== Etymology ==
The Greek word διγλωσσία (diglōssía), from δι- (di-, 'two') and γλῶσσα (glôssa, 'language'), meant bilingualism; it was given its specialized meaning "two forms of the same language" by Emmanuel Rhoides in the prologue of his Parerga in 1885. The term was quickly adapted into French as diglossie by the Greek linguist and demoticist Ioannis Psycharis, with credit to Rhoides.

The Arabist William Marçais used the term in 1930 to describe the linguistic situation in Arabic-speaking countries. The sociolinguist Charles A. Ferguson, building on his research regarding Moroccan Arabic and Bengali, introduced the English equivalent diglossia in 1959 in the title of an article. His conceptualization of diglossia describes a society with more than one prevalent language or the high variety, which pertains to the language used in literature, newspapers, and other social institutions. The article has been cited over 9,000 times. The term is particularly embraced among sociolinguists and a number of these proposed different interpretations or varieties of the concept.

== Language registers and types of diglossia ==
In his 1959 article, Charles A. Ferguson defines diglossia as follows:

DIGLOSSIA is a relatively stable language situation in which, in addition to the primary dialects of the language (which may include a standard or regional standards), there is a very divergent, highly codified (often grammatically more complex) superposed variety, the vehicle of a large and respected body of written literature, either of an earlier period or in another speech community, which is learned largely by formal education and is used for most written and formal spoken purposes but is not used by any sector of the community for ordinary conversation.

Here, diglossia is seen as a kind of bilingualism in a society in which one of the languages has high prestige (henceforth referred to as "H"), and another of the languages has low prestige ("L"). In Ferguson's definition, the high and low variants are always closely related.

Ferguson gives the example of standardized Arabic and says that, "very often, educated Arabs will maintain they never use L at all, in spite of the fact that direct observation shows that they use it constantly in ordinary conversation"

Joshua Fishman expanded the definition of diglossia to include the use of unrelated languages as high and low varieties. For example, in Alsace the Alsatian language (Elsässisch) serves as (L) and French as (H). Heinz Kloss calls the (H) variant exoglossia and the (L) variant endoglossia.

In some cases (especially with creole languages), the nature of the connection between (H) and (L) is not one of diglossia but a continuum; for example, Jamaican Creole as (L) and Standard English as (H) in Jamaica. Similar is the case in the Scottish Lowlands, with Scots as (L) and Scottish English as (H).

(H) is usually the written language whereas (L) is the spoken language. In formal situations, (H) is used; in informal situations, (L) is used. Sometimes, (H) is used in informal situations and as spoken language when speakers of two or more languages or (L) dialects communicate with each other (as a lingua franca), but not the other way around.

One of the earliest examples was that of Middle Egyptian, the language in everyday use in Ancient Egypt during the Middle Kingdom (2000–1650 BC). By 1350 BC, in the New Kingdom (1550–1050 BC), the Egyptian language had evolved into Late Egyptian, which itself later evolved into Demotic (700 BC – AD 400). These two later forms served as (L) languages in their respective periods. But in both cases, Middle Egyptian remained the standard written, prestigious form, the (H) language, and was still used for this purpose until the fourth century AD, more than sixteen centuries after it had ceased to exist in everyday speech.

Another historical example is Latin, Classical Latin being the (H) and Vulgar Latin the (L); the latter, which is almost completely unattested in text, is the range of non-formal registers of Latin from which the Romance languages descended.

The (L) variants are not just simplifications or "corruptions" of the (H) variants. In phonology, for example, (L) dialects are as likely to have phonemes absent from the (H) as vice versa. Some Swiss German dialects have three phonemes, /e/, /ɛ/ and /æ/, in the phonetic space where Standard German has only two phonemes, /ɛ(ː)/ (Berlin 'Berlin', Bären 'bears') and /eː/ (Beeren 'berries'). Jamaican Creole has fewer vowel phonemes than standard English, but it has additional palatal /kʲ/ and /ɡʲ/ phonemes.

Especially in endoglossia the (L) form may also be called "basilect", the (H) form "acrolect", and an intermediate form "mesolect".

Ferguson's classic examples include Standard German/Swiss German, Standard Arabic/Arabic vernaculars, French/Creole in Haiti, and Katharevousa/Dimotiki in Greece, though the "low prestige" nature of most of these examples has changed since Ferguson's article was published. Creole is now recognized as a standard language in Haiti; Swiss German dialects are hardly low-prestige languages in Switzerland (see Chambers, Sociolinguistic Theory); and after the end of the Greek military regime in 1974, Dimotiki was made into Greece's sole standard language in 1976, and nowadays, Katharevousa is (with a few exceptions) no longer used. Harold Schiffman wrote about Swiss German in 2010, "It seems to be the case that Swiss German was once consensually agreed to be in a diglossic hierarchy with Standard German, but that this consensus is now breaking." Code-switching is also commonplace, especially in the Arabic world; researchers have found that this switching between Standard Arabic and Dialectal Arabic calls for a reconceptualization of Ferguson's model of diglossia, which held that the two varieties occupy strictly separate functional domains. To a certain extent, there is code switching and overlap in all diglossic societies, even German-speaking Switzerland.

Examples where the High/Low dichotomy is justified in terms of social prestige include Italian dialects and languages as (L) and Standard Italian as (H) in Italy and German dialects and Standard German in Germany. In Italy and Germany, those speakers who still speak non-standard dialects typically use those dialects in informal situations, especially in the family. In German-speaking Switzerland, on the other hand, Swiss German dialects are to a certain extent even used in schools, and to a larger extent in churches. Ramseier calls German-speaking Switzerland's diglossia a "medial diglossia", whereas Felicity Rash prefers "functional diglossia". Paradoxically, Swiss German offers both the best example of diglossia (all speakers are native speakers of Swiss German and thus diglossic) and the worst, because there is no clear-cut hierarchy. While Swiss Standard German is spoken in formal situations like in school, news broadcasts, and government speeches, Swiss Standard German is also spoken in informal situations only whenever a German Swiss is communicating with a German-speaking foreigner who it is assumed would not understand the respective dialect. Amongst themselves, the German-speaking Swiss use their respective Swiss German dialect, irrespective of social class, education or topic.

In most African countries, as well as some Asian ones, a European language serves as the official, prestige language, and local languages are used in everyday life outside formal situations. For example, Wolof is the everyday lingua franca in Senegal, French being spoken only in very formal situations, and English is spoken in formal situations in Nigeria, but native languages like Hausa, Igbo, and Yoruba are spoken in ordinary conversation. However, a European language that serves as an official language can also act as a lingua franca, being spoken in informal situations between speakers of two or more languages to facilitate communication.

Diglossia can exist between two dialects of a European language as well. For example, in Côte d'Ivoire, Standard French is the prestige language used in business, politics, etc. while Ivorian French is the daily language in the street, on the markets, and in informal situations in general; in Mozambique, European Portuguese is used in formal situations, while Mozambican Portuguese is the spoken language in informal situations; and British English is used in formal situations in Nigeria, while Nigerian English is the spoken language in informal situations. In the countryside, local African dialects prevail. However, in traditional events, local languages can be used as prestige dialects: for example, a wedding ceremony between two young urban Baoulé people with poor knowledge of the Baoulé language (spoken in Côte d'Ivoire) would require the presence of elder family members as interpreters to conduct the ceremony in that language. Local languages, if used as prestige languages, are also used in writing materials in a more formal type of vocabulary.

There are also European languages in Africa, particularly North Africa, without official status that are used as prestige language: for example, in Morocco, while Modern Standard Arabic and recently Tamazight are the only two official languages used in formal situations, with Moroccan Arabic and Amazigh dialects spoken in informal situations, while French and Spanish are also spoken in formal situations, making some Moroccans bilinguals or trilinguals in Modern Standard Arabic or Tamazight, French or Spanish, and Moroccan Arabic or Amazigh dialects. In Sahrawi Arab Democratic Republic, the official languages are Modern Standard Arabic and Spanish, which are spoken in formal situations, while Hassaniya Arabic is spoken in informal situations, and Spanish is also spoken in informal situations.

In Asia, the Philippines is the biggest example of such colonial exoglossia, with English since the Spanish-American War of 1898, Spanish before then (with a historic presence in place names, personal names, and loanwords in the local languages) and local Austronesian Philippine languages used for everyday situations; Timor-Leste is in a similar situation with Portuguese. Most Asian countries instead have re-established a local prestige language (such as Hindi or Indonesian) and have at least partially phased out the colonial language, commonly English or Russian but also Dutch, French, and Portuguese in a few places, except for international, business, scientific, or interethnic communication; the colonial languages have also usually left many loanwards in the local languages.

=== Gender-based diglossia ===
In Ghana, a dialect called "Student Pidgin" was traditionally used by men in all-male secondary schools, though an ever-increasing number of female students are now also using it due to social change.

Gender-based oral speech variations are found in Arabic-speaking communities. Makkan males are found to adopt more formal linguistic variants in their WhatsApp messages than their female counterparts, who tend to use more informal "locally prestigious" linguistic variants.

Among Garifuna (Karif) speakers in Central America, men and women often have different words for the same concepts.

In Ireland, deaf men and women studied in two separate schools throughout the 19th and 20th centuries. Lack of contact between the two groups led to the development of gender-specific varieties of Irish Sign Language.

== In specific languages ==
=== Arabic ===
Arabic is the primary language spoken in the Arab world, which encompasses the Middle East and much of North Africa. While the standard Arabic form is known as Modern Standard Arabic (MSA), over 30 varieties of Arabic are assigned codes by the ISO, which arise from influence from other languages. Colloquial Arabic is used in everyday conversations, whereas MSA is used in formal settings, such as in writing and media. Children often learn colloquial (regionalized) Arabic through immersion, with MSA being later taught formally in school.

=== Chinese ===
Chinese languages are the primary languages spoken in China. Throughout the country, Standard Chinese has heavily influenced local languages through diglossia, replacing them entirely in some cases, especially among younger people in urban areas. Recent linguistics research draws parallels between the Chinese-specific experience of diglossia to the Greek experience with Koiné language, with a northern Mandarin koineization experience (centered around the Beijing dialect) being distinct from the Southern Mandarin koineization experience (centered around the Nanjing or Kaifeng dialect).

The advent of the modern diglossia phenomenon is further accelerated by a pre-existing feature of the Chinese language, where most Chinese language varieties already distinguish between the written and spoken vernacular forms, which includes all varieties of Mandarin and non-Mandarin Chinese; as a part of this concept, Chinese language distinguishes between 文 (wén), which refers to the written script or literature of a language, and 语/語 (yǔ), which refers to the spoken language.

=== Greek ===
Greek diglossia belongs to the category whereby, while the living language of the area evolves and changes as time passes by, there is an artificial retrospection to and imitation of earlier (more ancient) linguistic forms preserved in writing and considered to be scholarly and classic. One of the earliest recorded examples of diglossia was during the first century AD, when Hellenistic Alexandrian scholars decided that, in order to strengthen the link between the people and the glorious culture of the Greek "Golden Age" (5th c. BC), people should adopt the language of that era. The phenomenon, called "Atticism", dominated the writings of part of the Hellenistic period, the Byzantine and Medieval era. Following the Greek War of Independence of 1821 and in order to "cover new and immediate needs" making their appearance with "the creation of the Greek State", scholars brought to life "Katharevousa" or "purist" language. Katharevousa did not constitute the natural development of the language of the people, the "Koine", "Romeika", Demotic Greek or "Dimotiki" as it is currently referred to.

=== Singlish ===
While Singapore has predominantly been an English-speaking country, a more informal style of English has been developed and popularised within the country, assisted by its demographic who come from many countries. The Singaporean government has long insisted that English be the sole language used, both in formal settings and everyday life. However, in practice, Singlish is used predominantly in casual contexts, with speakers switching to English in formal contexts.

=== Tamil ===
Tamil, a Dravidian language and one of the eleven classical languages of India and spoken primarily in South Asia, is frequently cited as one of the clearest examples of diglossia. The high variety, Senthamizh (Pure, old, beautiful or literary Tamil), is used in formal writing, public speaking, religious texts, media, and education, while the low varieties, collectively called Kodunthamizh (colloquial, spoken, crooked or vulgar Tamil), is used in daily speech.

Tamil diglossia dates back over two thousand years. Sangam texts show a clear distinction between formal literary Tamil and the spoken language, making it one of the oldest living diglossic languages in the world.

The differences extend beyond vocabulary to grammar and morphology, making formal Tamil feel like a separate register that must be learnt in school, rather than acquired naturally. Children grow up speaking only colloquial Tamil at home, and encounter formal Tamil later in education. Scholars often compare Tamil’s diglossia to that of Arabic, noting that speakers switch depending on social context, with literary Tamil serving as a unifying standard across regions despite strong dialectal variation.

Tamil’s diglossic nature has influenced not only education but also literature, media, and everyday communication. Many modern writers deliberately mix formal and colloquial forms to achieve a stylistic effect or realism, while newspapers and textbooks maintain a consistent formal register. The persistence of diglossia has also contributed to the preservation of ancient Tamil grammar and classical literature (Sangam Literature), allowing texts that are over two thousand years old to remain comprehensible to contemporary readers with study. This separation between spoken and literary forms makes Tamil both a highly adaptable language and a unique example of how linguistic tradition can coexist with evolving daily speech.

=== West Frisian ===
Until West Frisian was recognized in the Netherlands, it was primarily a home-spoken language. Public society had opted for the use of Dutch language in daily life, however since its recognition, it has enjoyed much wider use in public.

== Sociolinguistics ==
As an aspect of study of the relationships between codes and social structure, diglossia is an important concept in the field of sociolinguistics. At the social level, each of the two dialects has certain spheres of social interaction assigned to it and in the assigned spheres it is the only socially acceptable dialect (with minor exceptions). At the grammatical level, differences may involve pronunciation, inflection, and/or syntax (sentence structure). Differences can range from minor (although conspicuous) to extreme. In many cases of diglossia, the two dialects are so divergent that they are distinct languages as defined by linguists: they are not mutually intelligible.

Thomas Ricento, an author on language policy and political theory, believes that there is always a "socially constructed hierarchy, indexed from low to high." The hierarchy is generally imposed by leading political figures or popular media and is sometimes not the native language of that particular region. The dialect that is the original mother tongue is almost always of low prestige. Its spheres of use involve informal, interpersonal communication: conversation in the home, among friends, in marketplaces. In some diglossias, this vernacular dialect is virtually unwritten. Those who try to use it in literature may be severely criticized or even persecuted. The other dialect is held in high esteem and is devoted to written communication and formal spoken communication, such as university instruction, primary education, sermons, and speeches by government officials. It is usually not possible to acquire proficiency in the formal, "high" dialect without formal study of it. Thus in those diglossic societies which are also characterized by extreme inequality of social classes, most people are not proficient in speaking the high dialect, and if the high dialect is grammatically different enough, as in the case of Arabic diglossia, these uneducated classes cannot understand most of the public speeches that they might hear on television and radio. The high prestige dialect (or language) tends to be the more formalised, and its forms and vocabulary often 'filter down' into the vernacular though often in a changed form.

In many diglossic areas, there is controversy and polarization of opinions of native speakers regarding the relationship between the two dialects and their respective statuses. In cases that the "high" dialect is objectively not intelligible to those exposed only to the vernacular, some people insist that the two dialects are nevertheless a common language. The pioneering scholar of diglossia, Charles A. Ferguson, observed that native speakers proficient in the high prestige dialect will commonly try to avoid using the vernacular dialect with foreigners and may even deny its existence even though the vernacular is the only socially appropriate one for themselves to use when speaking to their relatives and friends. Yet another common attitude is that the low dialect, which is everyone's native language, ought to be abandoned in favor of the high dialect, which presently is nobody's native language.

== See also ==
- Abstand and ausbau languages
- Bilingualism
- Code-switching
- Dialect continuum
  - Post-creole continuum
- Digraphia
- Glottopolitics
- Linguistic insecurity
- List of diglossic regions
- Minoritized languages
- Non-convergent discourse, where each speaker communicates in their own language, but everyone understands each other
- Norwegian language conflict
- Pluricentric language
- Polyglossia
- Register (sociolinguistics)
- Sociolinguistics
- Standard language
