= Social domain =

Communicative context

A social domain refers to communicative contexts which influence and are influenced by the structure of such contexts, whether social, institutional, power-aligned. As defined by Fishman, Cooper and Ma (1971), social domains "are sociolinguistic contexts definable for any given society by three significant dimensions: the location, the participants and the topic". Similarly, Bernard Spolsky defines domains as "[a]ny defined or definable social or political or religious group or community, ranging from family through a sports team or neighborhood or village or workplace or organization or city or nation state or regional alliance".

Social domains are relevant to such fields in the social sciences as anthropology, linguistics, and sociology. Some examples of social domains include the domains of school, family, religion, workplace, and government.

== Social domains in scholarly research ==
=== Education and schools ===
Education is an integral social institution which has a major impact on the development and maintenance of language policies around the world. Schools, aside from the family, provide the necessary resources for language socialization of the child which shape the experiences and impact the language competence of the students. The medium of instruction languages are decided based on the goals and needs of the education and governmental systems. So, while children learn different vernacular varieties or dialects at home, schools further influence the development of their linguistic skills and their language ideologies. Specifically, language varieties spoken at home may not have an agreed upon orthography, so schools work to teach the formalized, written form of the language. These actions impact the inclusion, acceptance, and interactions of students. In fact, by using Bucholtz and Hall's theory of intersubjectivity, Shanan Fitts argues that the imperatives of "adequation and distinction", "authentication and denaturalization", and "authorization and illegitimation" interact linguistically in school domains. For adequation and distinction, a student is able to identify and relate to other students through their linguistic similarities or differences, respectively. Meanwhile, authentication and denaturalization allows students to categorize their linguistic, and consequently, cultural identities either as natural or learned. Lastly, authorization and illegitimation are used in school domains through institutional or ideological methods to either support or oppose a specific linguistic practice depending on the goal of the school.

Because of the differences in vernacular or dialects between home and schools, some children may experience a linguistic gap, which is greatly affected by language education policies. Spolsky argues that schools should take this gap into consideration when deciding the medium of instruction and linguistic goals for themselves. Specifically, Spolsky highlights the controversy of incorporating a mother-tongue education in schools, which is an effort of teaching children using the linguistic varieties spoken at home. However, in the contexts of extreme multilingualism mother-tongue education is largely unattainable. There are a variety of methods used by schools to facilitate the transition between home languages, dialects, or vernaculars to the desired school language. One method used typically in the British colonial education system which starts the education by teaching in students' home language, transitions by introducing the official language, and ends by shifting towards total instruction in that official language. Contrastingly, systems like the French and Portuguese colonial models along with the English-only movement in the United States immediately begin instruction in the official language under the assumption that the students will learn it through immersion. There are a wide range of methods that fall in between the above-mentioned strategies, such as establishing communication in home languages, dialects, or vernaculars and using materials in the official language or also making an effort to maintain proficiency in a home language while transitioning them to the official language. Schools also impact language acquisition policies. If a country has a bilingual or multilingual policy or goal, schools are usually expected to help in the development of the other language(s). This may be done for two reasons: 1) teaching a major international language or a neighboring country's language can help incorporate students effectively and successfully into the globalized world; or 2) the teachings of minority or indigenous language(s) can help elevate them in a country to work towards diversity and inclusion.

=== Family ===
When considering the impact of the family on language two considerations should be made. On the one hand, family domains serve as speech communities in which the linguistic variety is different when compared to other domains. On the other hand, family is another crucial social institution in determining language policies.

With respect to the first consideration, it is a common fact that individuals modify the way they speak by changing their vocabulary, pronunciation, and syntax of their speech according to who it is they are talking to and the circumstances and surroundings of their conversation. The family social domain is not the exception. Different factors contribute to what a family domain becomes: socioeconomic class, number of parents in the family, the number of children, etc. Considering that many factors can contribute to this domain, the variation within the domain is determined by the influences of the practices and ideologies that the family has. What contributes to the linguistic repertoires within the family social domains may include the proficiency of a speaker in this language; the context of speaking, for example, making sure that the language used is well understood by everyone who's present; association with positive experiences; and acknowledgement of the effects of using this language.

With respect to language policy, family domain is a major locus of multilingual and monolingual experiences. The decisions of retaining the language or undergoing the language shift are often based in the families and they may not have any official status. For example, a decision of immigrant parents to only speak an L2 language with their child may lead the child being proficient only in that language and never acquiring L1 of his or her parents. Without this domain there would be loss in the way that information is transmitted through language. The three-generation theory argues that without family there is a loss of 'natural intergenerational transmission.' According to the three generation theory, the first generation of an immigrant family may not fully acquire the dominant language of the new location, but the second generation will learn this language and grow up bilingual. Meanwhile, by the third generation the knowledge of the L1 of the first generation will dissipate leading the immigrant family through language shift. To ensure the preservation of the language across generations, Fishman argued 'natural intergenerational transmission' is key.

=== Religion ===
Language choice varies among religious affiliations and congregations. Islam and Judaism traditionally provide religious texts in the original languages of Arabic and Hebrew, respectively. Islam has strict standards regarding the required use of Arabic in the religious domain, even if the user's mother tongue is not Arabic. Meanwhile, Judaism accepts translations of the religious text, although Hebrew is still central. These are distinct languages that have specific uses within the domain of religion. Variation of language ideologies within the domain of religion, even within a single religion, is common. Some Christian groups promote translating the Bible into the vernacular, while some Roman Catholics have a history of keeping the Bible in Latin and holding masses in Latin as well. On a micro-scale, a single person might use various languages in practice while praying, singing hymns, reading religious texts, confessing, or attending religious services. Knowing which language to use is dependent on the broader sociocultural expectations as well as the expectations of the religion itself, place of worship one attends, or specific congregation.

=== Workplace ===
The workplace is a setting where everyone needs to communicate with each other to get a task done. There are many different types of workplaces. There are different language norms depending on the workplace and the position of the people in conversation. The office workplace is a professional setting where more sophisticated words and different tones of voice are being used. Sometimes there are handbooks with the rules of the office everyone must obey including sections on language. Leaders in the workplace which are generally managers not only put on the linguistic model for their workers but also get to initiate the pathway. The more motivational leaders are the more passionate and effective the workers become. They use motivational language in conversation and meetings to provide an effective environment to work in. They act as enforcers to use speech to connect with everyone. There is also communication used through technology such as emails that are very professional. There are different audiences as well as conversations at work.

=== Government ===
As a social domain, governments and their affiliated agencies can generally be defined as businesses or workplaces. Just as businesses are growing ever more diverse in our globalizing world, governments, too, are adapting, expanding, and developing on various social practices to create social domains within their structure that are conducive to an appropriate atmosphere for what they want to accomplish and the presence they wish to portray to their superiors, subordinates, constituents, and possibly even foreign bodies. Some governments and their affiliates may have strict limitations on what is considered appropriate topics of conversation in the workplace while others may be more accepting of more diverse forms and topics of conversation. Governments also tend to have a specific language, or certain languages, which is considered appropriate to speak in the workplace. This can be as rigid as disallowing all non-conforming languages from the workplace or as loose as having a rule of thumb such as certain languages being acceptable for interpersonal communication, but official documentation being required to be submitted in a specific language.

== Similar concepts ==
=== Semantic domains ===
A semantic domain applies to word usage such as choosing to say hoagie instead of sandwich, with this choice not necessarily being dependent on one's social domain, but rather contextual relevance. Another example is choosing not to say "It is raining cats and dogs outside" when it is just drizzling. Semantic domains involve using words that have the same meaning and also certain language the speaker is familiar with.

=== Speech communities ===
A speech community is a group of people who share the same linguistic ideologies. Speech communities can be more or less inclusive than social domains; for example, a group of German-speakers getting coffee together can constitute a speech community, as can an entire city.
