= Glottopolitics =

Language policy in society

Glottopolitics is a sociolinguistic concept coined by Jean-Baptiste Marcellesi and Louis Guespin. The concept later became a critical perspective for the study of the political in language and the linguistic in the political. Some scholars also consider it a subdisicpline of sociolinguistics.

== Concept and history ==
It may be defined as any action taken by society to manage language interaction. Glottopolitics is constantly at work; it is a continuum that ranges from minuscule acts to considerable interventions, ultimately concerning language itself: promotion, prohibition, change of status, etc. There can be no social community without glottopolitics. It is a social practice from which no one can escape (people "do glottopolitics without knowing it", whether they are ordinary citizens or ministers of the economy).

== See also ==
- Glottophobia
- Shibboleth

== Bibliography ==
- Arnoux, Elvira Narvaja de (2000). «La Glotopolítica: transformaciones de un campo disciplinario». Lenguajes: teorías y prácticas (Buenos Aires: Gobierno de la Ciudad de Buenos Aires, Secretaría de Educación): 95–109.
- Marcellesi, J.-B. (2003). «Glottopolitique : ma part de verité». Glottopol. Revue de sociolinguistique en ligne (Rouen: Université de Rouen) (1, enero).
- Blanco, Mercedes Isabel (2005). «Políticas lingüísticas, planificación idiomática, glotopolítica: trayecto por modelos de acción sobre las lenguas». Cuadernos del Sur. Letras (Bahía Blanca: Université de Rouen) (35–36). ISSN 1668-7426.
- Valle, José del (2005). «Glotopolítica, ideología y discurso: categorías para el estudio del estatus simbólico del español». La lengua, ¿patria común? Ideas e ideologías del español (Madrid/Frankfurt del Main: Vervuert/Iberoamericana): 14–29.
- Arnoux, Elvira Narvaja de (2008). «Ámbitos para el español: recorridos desde una perspectiva glotopolítica». Reverte. Revista de Estudos e Reflexões Tecnológicas da Faculdade de Tecnologia de Indaiatuba (6). ISSN 2236-1294.
- Arnoux, Elvira Narvaja de; Valle, José del (2010). «Las representaciones ideológicas del lenguaje: Discurso glotopolítico y panhispanismo». Spanish in Context (Ámsterdam/Filadelfia: John Benjamins Publishing Company) (VII, 1): 124.
