= 2009 ban of Hungarian President from Slovakia =

Political and diplomatic controversy

Hungarian president László Sólyom was not allowed to step on Slovak soil on August 21, 2009, as he was about to attend the unveiling of a statue of St. Stephen, the first king of Hungary (1000–1038), in Komárno, Slovakia (Hungarian: Révkomárom), a town near the Hungarian border, where ethnic Hungarians form the majority of the population.

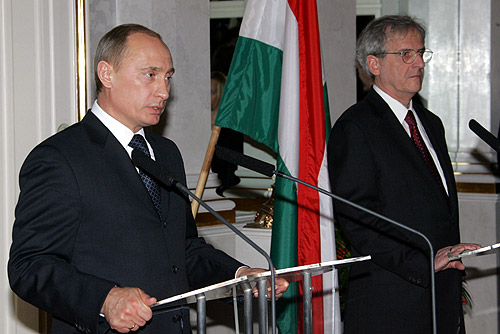
László Sólyom is seen at right during a 2006 joint press conference with Russian Federation president Vladimir Putin.

The only official reason given for the denial was that the Hungarian president's visit might have constituted a security risk. Slovak prime minister Robert Fico had claimed that police would be unable to prevent Slovak extremist groups from disturbing the ceremony.

In the two days preceding the visit, Slovakia had raised four other objections to the planned trip:

- The ceremony might suggest a claim of Hungarian sovereignty over Slovak soil.
- Slovakia was informed late about the visit.
- The date of the visit fell one day after the Hungarian national holiday commemorating St. Stephen and coincided with the Warsaw Pact invasion of Czechoslovakia.
- Slovak leaders were not invited, nor did the president have plans to meet with them.

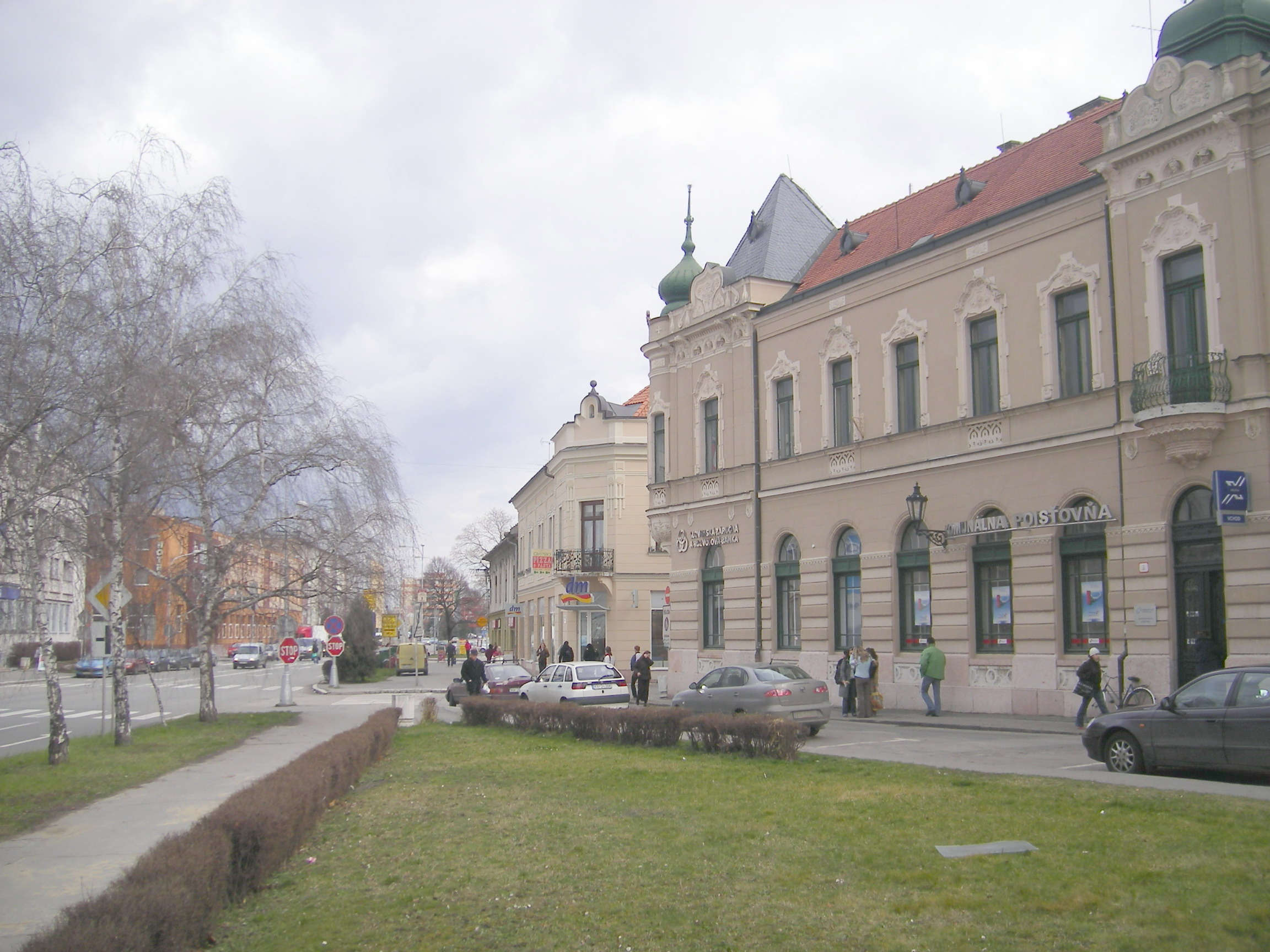
The square in Komárno where the life-size bronze statue of St. Stephen on horseback has since been erected, photographed in 2007.

Declaring the Hungarian head of state an unwelcome person (essentially persona non grata, although this term was not used) created additional diplomatic conflict in already tense Hungary–Slovakia relations.

== Purpose of the planned visit ==
László Sólyom was invited by a civic association, Szent István Szobor Bizottság ("St. Stephen Statue Committee"), to a statue unveiling ceremony in Komárno, Slovakia (Hungarian: Révkomárom).

Both the Catholic and the Orthodox churches regard King Stephen as a saint for his role in converting the peoples of his kingdom to Christianity. Pope Gregory VII canonized him, his son and a bishop; August 20, 1083, the day of the canonization, is a public holiday in Hungary, regarded as the foundation of Hungarian statehood. In his Admonitions to his son, he declared, as cited in the planned speech of Sólyom for the unveiling:

[A] kingdom with only one language and having only one custom is weak and frail.

— Stephen of Hungary.

The Komárno statue was due to be unveiled on the day after this anniversary, that is, on August 21, 2009.

The erection of the statue itself was criticized in February 2009 by the extremist and nationalist Slovak National Party (SNS), one of the parties in Slovakia's governing coalition, because the town had not erected statues of Saints Cyril and Methodius, two Byzantine Greek missionaries among the Slavic peoples of Great Moravia and Pannonia. The statue was consequently placed only on the balcony of the Matica Slovenská, a cultural and scientific institution focusing on Slovakia-related topics.

== Objections of Slovakia against the visit ==
=== Security risk ===
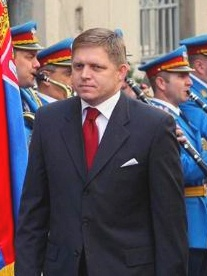
Robert Fico, Prime Minister of Slovakia.

Slovak Prime Minister Robert Fico said on August 19 that he could not prevent Sólyom from entering the country and sent a letter to the Hungarian embassy warning of potential security risks, saying that his Direction – Social Democracy party government would not prevent extremists of the nationalist Slovenská pospolitosť (Slovak Brotherhood) from going there to demonstrate.

“We will not check the Slovak Republic and we cannot know whether someone will try to use the visit of the president in Komárno in some sensitive questions.”

— Robert Fico

According to the Ministry of Foreign Affairs of Hungary, there were no real security risks involved around the ceremony:

[T]here was only a small number of protesters at the location of the ceremony, which the Slovak police were - by the usual means of the police - able to keep under control.

— Ministry of Foreign Affairs of Hungary

=== Date ===
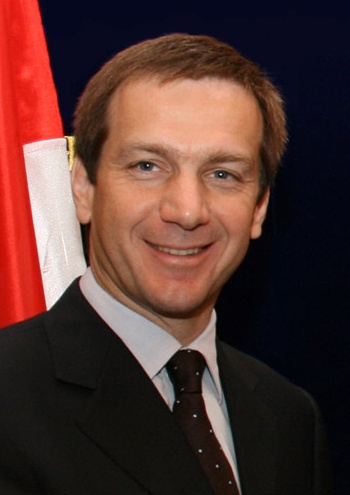
Hungarian Prime Minister Gordon Bajnai stated that the planned visit had nothing to do with the 1968 events.

Two days before the planned visit, the Slovak parliamentary foreign affairs committee called the trip "a diplomatic provocation" because of the August 21 date, although the date was chosen by the mayor of Komárno, not by Sólyom. August 21 is the anniversary of the Warsaw Pact invasion of Czechoslovakia led by the Soviet Union after the 1968 Prague Spring. Being a Warsaw Pact state, the People's Republic of Hungary also sent troops into Slovakia; Poland and Bulgaria also took part in the Soviet putsch.

Slovak Prime Minister Robert Fico compared László Sólyom to the soldiers invading Czechoslovakia: "In 1968 Hungarian tanks were coming to Slovakia. Now it's someone in a fancy limousine."

Hungarian prime minister Bajnai telephoned his Slovak counterpart on the phone to reassure him that the visit was unconnected with the 1968 events and reminding him that in 2008, the 40th anniversary of the Prague Spring, Sólyom had made a speech officially expressing his regret at the 1968 invasion.

"I feel necessary - as the head of state of the free and democratic Republic of Hungary - to express my deep regret for the peoples of then-Czechoslovakia, that the Hungarian troops took part in the oppression in 1968. Can we even conceive what happened, twelve years after the Soviet Army attacked Hungary to crush its revolution in a war of bloodshed? The Kádár-system ["the communist era in Hungary"] had driven Hungary into a situation where we attacked a country that wanted greater freedom.”

— László Sólyom on 21 August 2008 in front of a Budapest museum

However some in the Slovak press questioned if Fico were truly troubled by the date; the Slovak paper SME wrote:

“Can anyone take it seriously that our successors of communism [i.e., the governing coalition]) led by the one [Fico] who didn't notice November 17 [date of the 1989 Velvet revolution], are troubled by the date marking the beginning of "normalization", which jump-started their career?"

=== Late notification ===
On June 19, 2009, Sólyom had notified Peter Weiss, Slovakia's ambassador to Hungary, of the planned visit, regarded as the "highest level of official notification" in diplomacy. Sólyom's office stated that Slovakia had mentioned no objections to the trip until the week of the planned visit.:

“There were no indications of any objections against the ceremony, its date or any other circumstance around the presence of László Sólyom until the press releases of August 19.”

— Message of the Office of the President of the Republic of Hungary

Slovak Prime Minister Robert Fico called this statement a lie, claiming that Hungary only informed Slovakia on August 13. Foreign Minister of Hungary, Péter Balázs retorted that the named date, August 13, was the start of the technical preparations and not the notification, which had happened on June 19.

=== Stressing Hungarian statehood in inappropriate circumstances ===
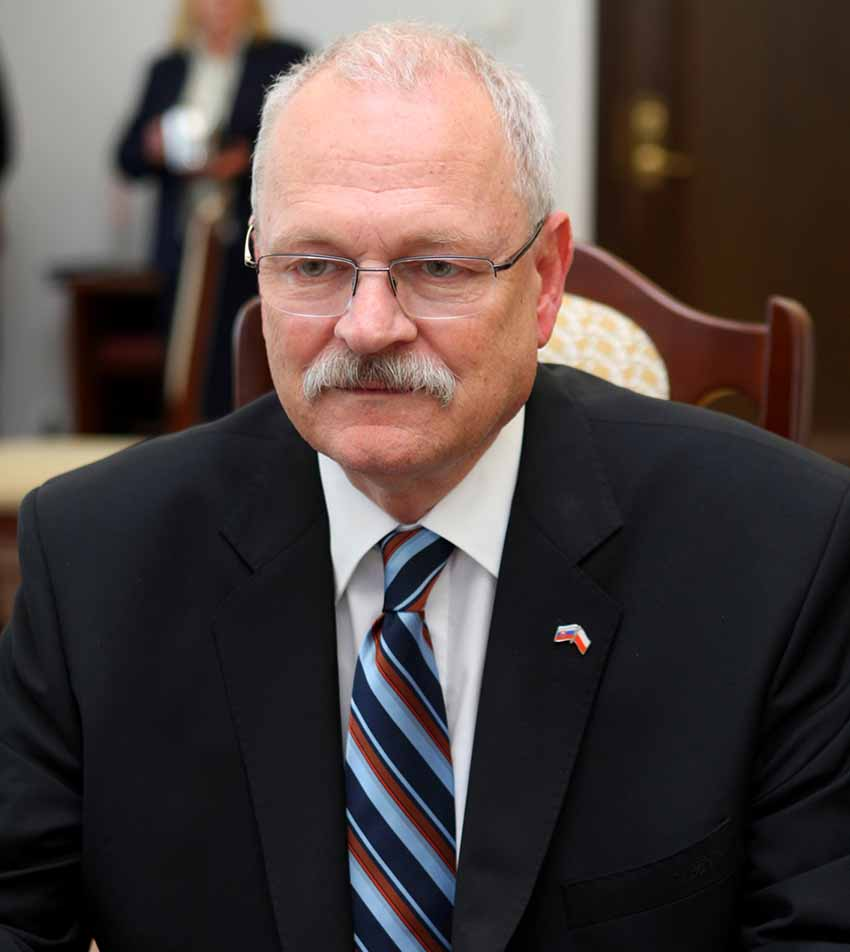
Ivan Gašparovič, President of the Slovak Republic, said Sólyom "likes to prowl around" in areas of the Hungarian Kingdom that do not belong to present-day Hungary.

The three main leaders of Slovakia Ivan Gašparovič (President of the Republic), Robert Fico (Prime Minister) and Pavol Paska (Chairman of the Parliament) stated in a common declaration that the visit is a "deliberate provocation against Slovakia".

“The president, the chairman of parliament and the prime minister of Slovakia have condemned the circumstances in which the Hungarian president chose to stress Hungarian statehood on sovereign Slovak soil.”

— Robert Fico, Slovak Prime Minister

“He will want to show: it is an area where 'we' [meaning the Hungarians] are the lords and 'we' will decide about our things. What Hungary - especially through their president - does in the recent days and months is very dangerous.”

— Robert Fico

The Ministry of Foreign Affairs of Hungary noted:

Hungary respects the sovereignty and territorial integrity of other countries. It considers important to have an unobstructed contact with each other's minorities. Hungary sees: with the Slovak step, the freedom of speech, one of the fundamental political rights, has also been violated.

— Ministry of Foreign Affairs of Hungary on August 24, 2009

=== No plans of meeting Slovak leaders ===
Slovaks have criticised Sólyom for not inviting Slovak leaders to the ceremony or meeting them somewhere else, even though Sólyom was not the organizer of the ceremony, as it was organized by the town of Komárno. Previously, the Slovak diplomatic establishment informed the Hungarian diplomatic establishment that Ivan Gašparovič, the head of state of Slovakia would be on vacation on the day of the visit. Gašparovič declared earlier that he would only accept any invitations if the town also erects statues of Saints Cyril and Methodius. Neither Gašparovič nor Fico distanced themselves from government party leader Ján Slota for his earlier comments disparaging Saint Stephen, the king portrayed by the Komárno statue, as a "clown on a horse". Fico made further attacks on Saint Stephen and also said Slovaks should not consider him as their king.

== Timeline of events ==
=== June 19 ===
On June 19, László Sólyom met the new ambassador of Slovakia to Hungary, Peter Weiss. On this meeting Sólyom informed Weiss about the planned ceremony he was invited to, and that he intends to go there.

=== August 13 ===
On August 13, the bilateral technical preparations to the ceremony began.

=== August 19 ===
Two days before the planned visit, on August 19, the committee of foreign affairs of the Slovak Parliament called the trip a diplomatic provocation because of the date August 21, anniversary of the Warsaw Pact invasion of Czechoslovakia.

Ivan Gašparovič, President of the Slovak Republic called the visit an "inconsiderate decision", stating to the press that he is not surprised because he knows Sólyom "likes to prowl around" in the countries that are in the area of the pre-1920 Kingdom of Hungary.

Back then, Fico said they can not and will not prevent Sólyom from entering the country.

=== August 20 ===
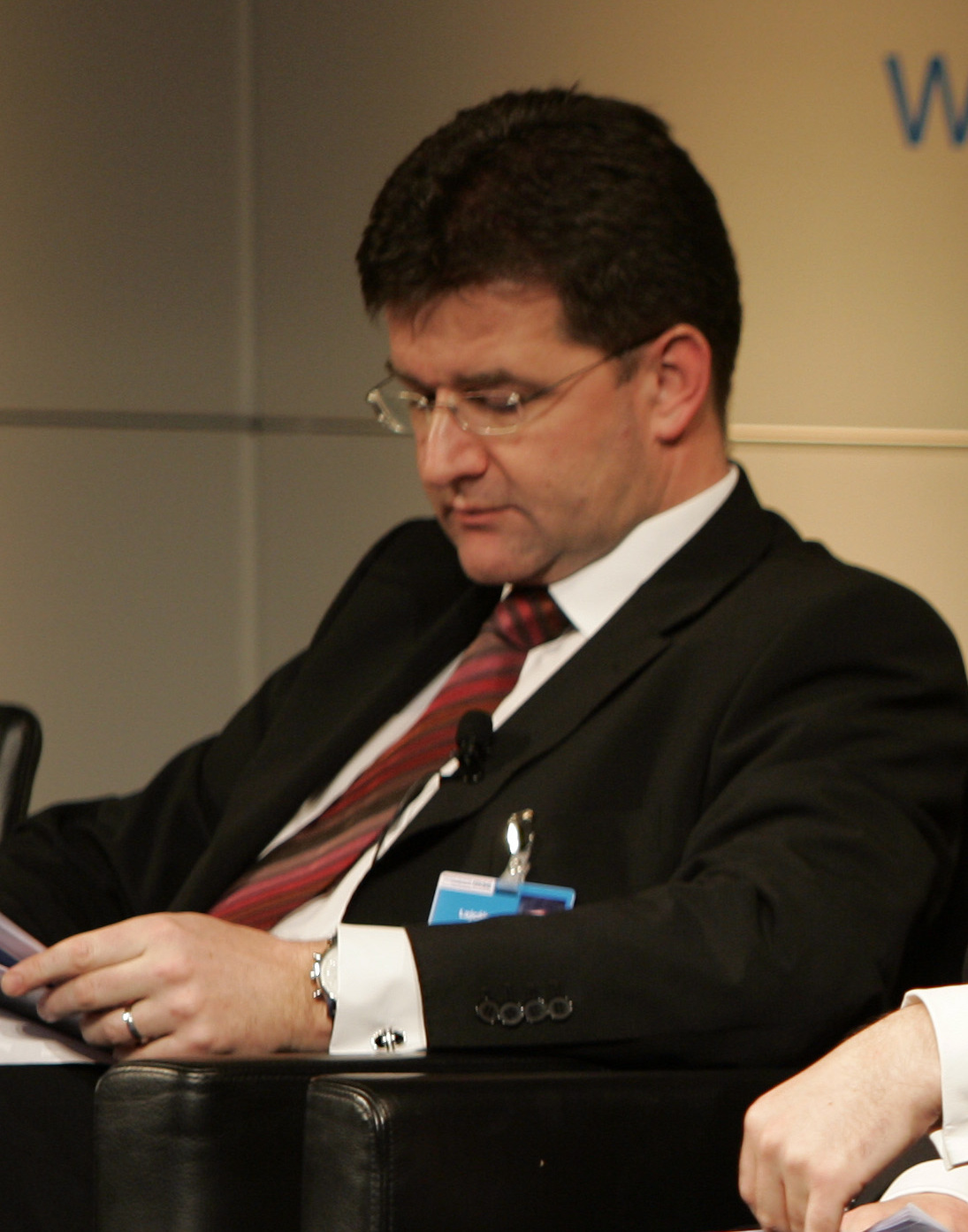
Miroslav Lajčák, Slovak Minister of Foreign Affairs said Slovak-Hungarian relations have already been harmed by the issue.

On August 20, Miroslav Lajčák, Minister of Foreign Affairs of Slovakia officially informed Antal Heizer, ambassador of Hungary in Bratislava that László Sólyom is not recommended to cross the border on the next day. He also called Péter Balázs, Hungarian Minister of Foreign Affairs on the phone about the issue.

“We have reasons to think that this visit will harm the Slovak-Hungarian relations. If László Sólyom would not like this to happen, then the visit will not take place.”

— Miroslav Lajcák, Slovak Minister of Foreign Affairs

=== August 21 ===
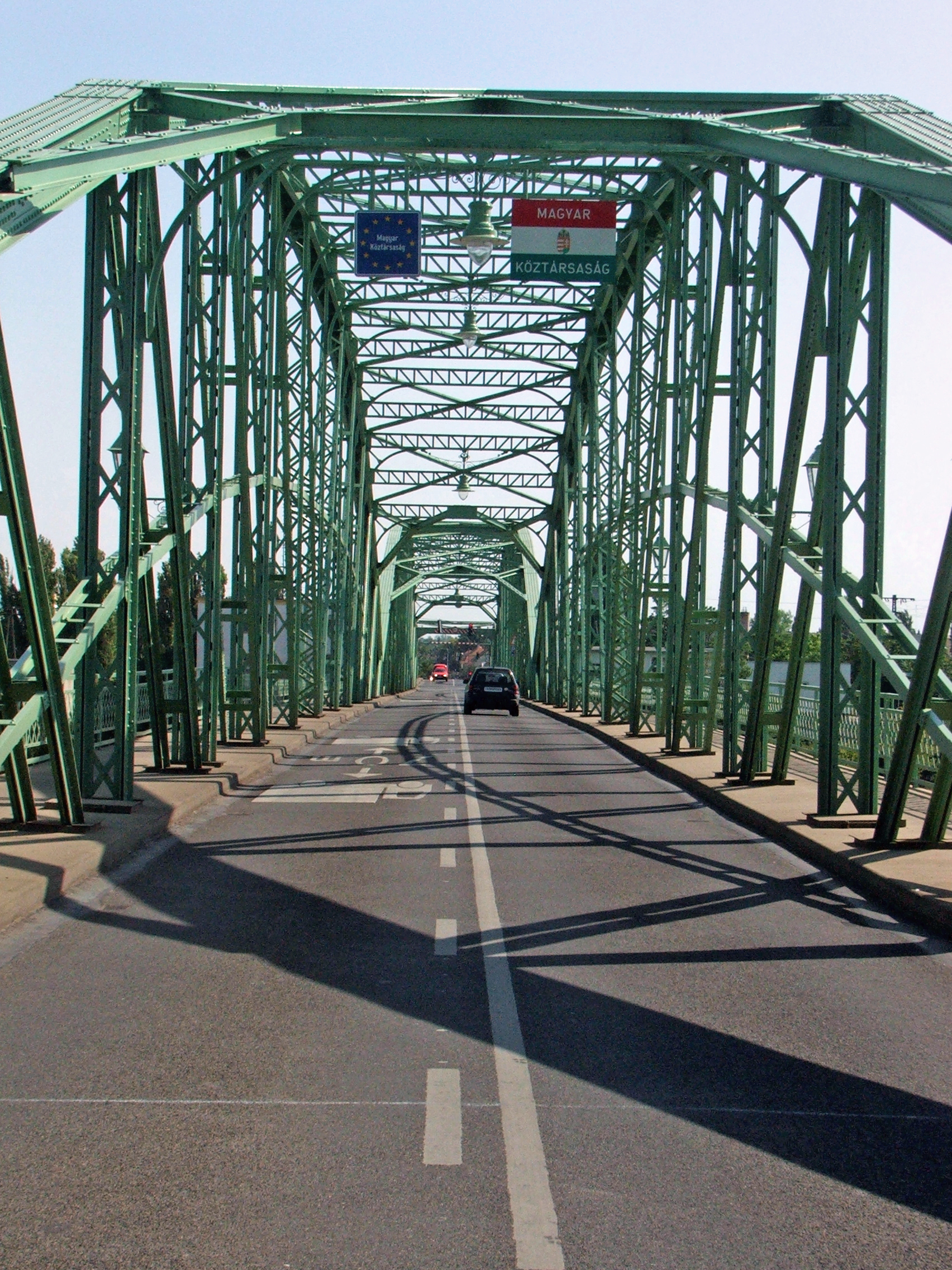
The Elizabeth Bridge connecting Komárom, Hungary with Komárno, Slovakia. The bridge where President Sólyom planned to cross the border.

On Friday, August 21, Ivan Gašparovič, President of the Slovak Republic asked László Sólyom to think over the visit.

“I'd be glad if he [Sólyom] took this message very seriously.”

— Ivan Gašparovič, President of the Slovak Republic

He said if despite the message, Sólyom decides to visit the unveiling, Slovak authorities must do everything to protect him.

László Sólyom sent a message to Gašparovič in which he indicated that he maintains his intentions about unveiling the statue. He wrote in the message that he informed Slovakia in time and no objections have been raised earlier about the date. He also made clear that he already expressed his regret about the aggression against Czechoslovakia in a public speech on the 40th anniversary in 2008.

==== Denial of entry ====
Slovak Prime Minister Robert Fico announced in the afternoon, hours before the unveiling that Sólyom will be not allowed to enter the territory of Slovakia. The document stating this was sent to the Hungarian embassy in Bratislava.

“The private trip, with a planned public speech, is considered a provocation, and, in such circumstances, the Hungarian president is an unwelcome person in Slovakia on August 21.”

— Robert Fico

Fico also told the press that Slovak authorities would not prevent the president from crossing the border by physical force, but they will consider it as a serious provocation if he still enters Slovakia. Miroslav Lajčák, Slovak Minister of Foreign Affairs said the relations of Hungary and Slovakia have already been harmed by this issue.

On the border Ján Packa, executive of the police of Slovakia and a great number of policemen were waiting.

President Sólyom did not enter Slovakia, after the embassy received a document stating that Sólyom is refused entry into Slovakia:

“[...] in consideration of the risk to security, the responsible bodies of the Slovak Republic, under Directive 2004/38/EC dated 29 April of the European Parliament and the European Council as well as Act 48/2002 Z.z. of the National Council of the Slovak Republic on the presence of foreigners and its further specifications, and under Act 171/1993 of the National Council of the Slovak Republic on the Police Force and its further specifications, it deny admission to the territory of the Slovak Republic to the president of the Republic of Hungary, Mr. László Sólyom on 21 August”

He walked to the middle of the bridge over the Danube leading from Hungarian Komárom to Slovak Komárno and held a press conference about the events on the Hungarian side of the border. He stated:

“I turn back because they can not rouse me into a deliberate law infringement as I am a lawyer and a head of state. However, I hope the people of Komárom will remember this visit in their hearts, and that I will come back.”
“In a relation of two allied states, this step is unexplainable and inexplicable, with particular attention to the given reason of the ban stating that my presence constitutes a security risk.”
“I hope the hysteria of the highest state levels in the last days does not reflect the feelings of the Slovak nation.”

— László Sólyom

== Ceremony in absence of Sólyom ==
The news stating that Sólyom is not allowed to enter Slovakia, was received with loud whistling among the gathered 2000-3000 people on the square where the statue was about to be unveiled.

The speeches before the unveiling were about the needed cooperation, and encouraged peace between the two countries, which was received with applause by the mainly Hungarian celebrators.

A few Slovak protesters attended the ceremony, with signs saying among others "Sólyom, go home".

Antal Heizer, ambassador of Hungary in Bratislava read the planned ceremonial speech of László Sólyom to the crowd.

Hungarian politicians of Slovakia took part in the ceremony, among others the mayor of the town, Tibor Bastrnák.

== Reactions of Hungarian diplomatic establishment ==
The government of Hungary called the ban "unexpected", "unfounded" and its justification "deplorable" and "unacceptable".

Péter Balázs Hungarian Minister of Foreign Affairs - cutting his vacation short - called in the Slovak ambassador Peter Weiss and protested the unprecedented act coming from an EU and NATO member state. Péter Balázs asked for explanation.

We see it as unprecedented and unacceptable that an EU and NATO member state bars the Head of State of the Republic of Hungary from their territory.

— Péter Balázs

The chairman of the Committee of Foreign Affairs of the Parliament of Hungary, Zsolt Németh declared:

“This is the result of a long process, that raised anti-Hungarianism to a government level in the last three years, the main reason of which is that Prime Minister Robert Fico has put an extremist party into the government.″

— Zsolt Németh

He also claimed that it is the duty of the international community to find a way of driving Slovakia back to the road of respecting human rights and minority rights.

The political parties of Hungary have also protested against the Slovak decision. The governing Hungarian Socialist Party (MSZP) said, it is definitely Slovakia who is responsible for the worsened relations, who as a young nation state seek their identity, which sometimes turns into fierce nationalism.

=== Legal disputes ===
According to Péter Balázs, the ban was not lawful, because the already given international permissions haven't been withdrawn and so the embassy just got an "unfriendly" document, which would in theory have allowed Sólyom to enter Slovakia. He also said the Slovak diplomacy has turned international law "upside down" by leaving the international permissions while banning Sólyom personally, as a civilian. He stated that Hungary plans to inform the EU and a broader international public about this "rude" political action.

==== Legality confirmed ====
On 6 March 2012 Advocate General at the European Court of Justice Yves Bot gave an opinion on the legality of the ban. He concluded that the visit was not a private but an official one and as such was not covered by the free movement provisions of the EU law. Diplomatic relations are governed exclusively by the member states and follow the international law under which visits by the heads of states depend on the consent of the host state. The court, dismissing the action brought by Hungary, followed the general line of reasoning of the Advocate General.

== Media coverage ==
=== Slovakia ===
In the Slovak press, the opinions were divided about the move of the Slovak government. Those sympathizing with the government have generally agreed with the move. Dag Daniš of Pravda wrote:

“The trip of Hungarian president to Komárno has failed miserably. For Hungary and Slovakia as well. The only one responsible for it, however is Sólyom. He could've missed out on this diplomatic mess-up. Provided he hadn't been stubborn and arrogant.”

— Dag Daniš, journalist, Pravda

More liberal and less pro-government papers have also condemned the Slovak reaction, not only Sólyom. As Peter Morvay of SME wrote:

“Insinuations about deliberate provocation from beyond Danube [i.e. Hungary] is just plain nonsense. Even Hungarian infatuation doesn't justify such an excessive reaction from Fico & Co. unheard of in civilized parts of Europe. Can anyone take it seriously that our successors of communism [i.e. the governing coalition]) led by the one [Fico] who didn't notice November 17 [day of the Velvet revolution in 1989], are troubled by the date marking the beginning of "normalization", which jump-started their career?”

Most of these media empires are regularly accused of being the sole advocates of the opposition (fueled mostly by the prime minister's attacks on the media). Yet numerous members of the opposition have agreed with the ban. Mikuláš Dzurinda, president of the leading opposition party SDKÚ has been quoted to say that Sólyom is instigating conflicts. Pavol Abrhán, member of the opposite KDH has suggested that a diplomatic note should be sent to Hungary.

=== Czech Republic ===
The Czech media was amongst the first comment on the topic blaming both sides for the situation that arose. Mladá Fronta Dnes columnist Magdalena Sodomková wrote:

“ It was not only the provocateur Solyom [...] who acted tragicomically. The actions of the Slovak politicians are embarrassing as well. With all heart, connecting the celebrations of (a foreign, but still holy) King Stephen I with the anniversary of the occupation (of the Warsaw Pact) is a bit far-fetched.[...]”

— Magdalena Sodomková, journalist, Mladá Fronta Dnes

Another daily, Lidové noviny wrote an article in a similar tone:

“If we (i.e. the Czechs) would interpret history the same way as today's rulers of Slovakia, then we'd have to rename Charles Bridge and also Rudolfinum, which bears the name of the successor to the oppressing Austrian throne.[...]Shocking is also the fact that the Slovaks are unsettled by the reason of the visit itself, that is the inauguration of the statue of King Saint Stephen (in Komárno).[...]”

— Luboš Palata, journalist, Lidové Noviny

== See also ==
- Hungary–Slovakia relations
- An unofficial Hungarian translation of the diplomatic note sent to László Sólyom (by the Office of the President of Hungary)
