= Language law of Slovakia =

Linguistic regulation in Slovakia

Language law of Slovakia is primarily governed by two acts:

- The Act on the State Language of the Slovak Republic (Act No. 270/1995), also known as the "State Language Act". It fixes the status and regulates the use of the Slovak language. It took force on 1 January 1996 (except article 10, which entered into force on 1 January 1997), and underwent several amendments, such as by Act No. 204/2011.
- The Act on the Use of Languages of National Minorities (Act No. 184/1999), also known as the "Minority Language Act". Amongst other things, it stipulates that municipalities where at least 15% of the population in two consecutive censuses speak the same minority language, have the right to use their minority language in official communications with local authorities, who are required to respond in that minority language.

A further Act on the Status of National Minorities, covering several aspects of education, was in preparation as of 2022.

== Legal texts ==
=== Article 6 Constitution of Slovakia ===
1. The State Language on the territory of the Slovak Republic is the Slovak language.
2. The use of languages other than the state language in official communications shall be laid down by law.

— Article 6 Constitution of Slovakia

=== State Language Act ===
[Preamble] Bearing in mind that the Slovak language is the most important attribute of the Slovak nation's specificity and the most precious value of its cultural heritage, as well as an expression of sovereignty of the Slovak Republic and a general vehicle of communication for all its citizens, which secures their freedom and equality in dignity and rights^{1} in the territory of the Slovak Republic, the National Council of the Slovak Republic has resolved to adopt the following Act:

1 Introductory Provision

(1) The Slovak language shall be the state language in the territory of the Slovak Republic.^{2}
(2) The state language shall have priority over other languages used in the territory of the Slovak Republic.
(3) This Act does not regulate the use of liturgical languages. The use of such languages is governed by the regulations of churches and religious communities.^{3}
(4) Unless this Act provides otherwise, the use of the languages of national minorities and ethnic groups are governed by separate regulations.^{4}

— Preamble and Article 1 of the State Language Act (as of February 2020)

In the mixed territories, bilingualism is preserved. In towns with a minority of at least 10%, it is possible to use the minority language in certain official situations. The law names several circumstances of public and official situations, – e.g. doctors (although all medical personnel are exempt from the financial sanctions) – in which the use of the Slovak language should take precedence both in written and spoken form. Despite this, the law does not apply to the Czech language, which can be used in any circumstance and occasion whatsoever, as Czech and Slovak are mutually intelligible.

=== Minority Language Act ===
A citizen of the Slovak Republic who is a person belonging to a national minority has the right to use, apart from the State Language^{1}, his or her national Minority Language (hereinafter referred to as „Minority Language“). The purpose of this Act is to lay down, in conjunction with specific legal acts^{2}, the rules governing the use of Minority Languages also in official communication.

— Article 1 of the Act on the Use of Languages of National Minorities of 10 July 1999

Footnote 1 in Article 1 of the Minority Language Act refers to Article 1, paragraph 4 of State Language Act, while footnote 2 refers to various other legal acts.

== History of legislation ==
=== 1990 ===
The Act of the Slovak National Council No. 428/1990 Coll. on the Official Language in the Slovak Republic was adopted on 25 October 1990, when Slovakia was still part of Czechoslovakia (known as the Czech and Slovak Federative Republic from 23 April 1990 to 31 December 1992). In communities having at least a 20% minority population, the minority language could be used in all official communications.

According to González (2001), minority languages were in fact used in all official communications, while Daftary & Gál (2000) asserted that although the Act 'was a legitimate step in language policy', 'employees of state administration and local self-government bodies were not required to know and use the minority language', and they could restrict the use of minority languages. Kontra (1995, 1996) concluded that 'the Act on the Official Language resulted in confusion and inter-ethnic antagonism', with Slovak nationalists claiming it went too far, and Hungarian minority members claiming it hadn't gone far enough. Several linguistic disputes emerged. For example, some mayors in bilingual municipalities had begun putting up bilingual place name signs, in October 1991 leading the Ministry of the Interior to claim these signs were illegal and to order them taken down, whereas minority Hungarians argued the Act did not explicitly prohibit such signs, and thus "what is not prohibited is permitted".

The Act was repealed when the Act No. 270/1995 (State Language Act) entered into force on 1 January 1996.

=== 1995 ===
In 1993, Czechoslovakia dissolved into the Czech Republic and Slovakia. The Slovak National Party and its cultural organization Matica Slovenska urged the creation of laws to "protect" the state language. The modifications (called "language law without exceptions") of 1995 contained punishments for not using Slovak in official communication, regardless of the percentage of the minority in the area. This was later shown to violate the constitution of Slovakia and was abolished by the Constitutional Court. The new 1995 law vacates the earlier.

=== 1999 ===
For the accession of Slovakia to the European Union, Slovakia had to accept a law on minority language use. This was created in 1999, and allowed use of minority languages in public situations (such as hospitals) in areas with at least 20% minority.

== 2009 amendments controversy ==
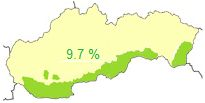
Areas in Slovakia where Hungarian speakers made up at least 20% around the year 2008

In 2009 the Slovak parliament passed a language law, mandating preferential use of the state language – Slovak. Use of a non-state language when conducting business could carry a financial penalty. Similarly, a penalty could be given for publishing books, journals or scientific proceedings in a language other than Slovak, or for singing in public in languages other than Slovak or the song's original language.

The 2009 amendment has been severely criticized by Hungarians in Slovakia, as well as the government, civil organizations and general public of neighboring Hungary, for being discriminatory toward Hungarians and their rights to use their Hungarian language. The controversy about the law is one of the key points in Hungary–Slovakia relations, brought to their lowest point for many years.

Opponents have described the law as one that "criminalises the use of Hungarian;" however, according to the Slovak government, the law itself doesn't interfere with use of minority languages.

=== Criticism in Hungary ===
Gordon Bajnai, the Hungarian Prime Minister, has charged Slovakia of scapegoating Hungarian speakers. Hungarian foreign minister Péter Balázs compared the creation of the language law to the politics of the Nicolae Ceauşescu regime on the use of language. Hungarian newspaper Budapest Times has questioned the dual standards for use the Czech language in Slovakia; however, this charge ignores the mutual intelligibility between Czech and Slovak, which renders them compatible in business and law.

President of Hungary László Sólyom expressed his worries about the law, because according to him the law violates "the spirit and at some places the word" of several bi- and multilateral agreements, and its perceived philosophy of "converting a multi-ethnic state to homogenous nation state" and "forced assimilation" is incompatible with the values of the European Union and the international laws protecting minorities.

Hungarian Prime Minister Gordon Bajnai said the law violates the words and the spirit of several bilateral and international agreements. He said Slovak politicians "do nationalism for a living" and he suspects the minority issues are getting into the foreground in Slovakia "to cover real problems".

Péter Balázs, Foreign Minister of Hungary, told Die Presse that Robert Fico, the Slovak Prime Minister, is "unfortunately trying to get popularity by cheap means".

According to Balázs, the real reason for the language law is gaining voters for the parliamentary elections of next year in Slovakia, by "playing the 'Hungarian card'", and sees the issue as "part of a little political game". He also stated that regarding the bilateral relations, he doesn't expect much from Robert Fico any more. Hungarian foreign minister Péter Balázs compared the creation of the language law to the politics of the Ceauşescu regime on the use of language.

All four parties of the Parliament of Hungary (Hungarian Socialist Party, Fidesz, Christian Democratic People's Party, Alliance of Free Democrats) issued a joint declaration asking Slovakia to repel the legislation.

Viktor Orbán, chairman of Hungary's opposition Fidesz and a former Prime Minister (1998–2002), said no 20th-century country "would have allowed themselves" such regulations, and called it an "absurdity" that Slovaks do it at the end of the first decade of the 21st century. Orbán added that not only democracies "but also mentally sound regimes" would not have tried creating such regulations, or "at least not without the risk of being ridiculed".

Former Hungarian Prime Minister Ferenc Gyurcsány also condemned the law in his blog, calling it an "outrage", and stated that there can be "no explanation or excuse" to make it acceptable:

Lajos Bokros, Member of the European Parliament (MEP) and former Hungarian Minister of Finance, condemned the law in a letter stating that Hungarians in Slovakia "want to get along on their homeland", and reminded Slovakia's MEPs that the Hungarian minority did a great contribution to Slovakia joining the European Union and the Eurozone.

Hungarian radical right-wing party Jobbik organized a half-road block demonstration on the border in Komárom, stating that "the issue is no longer an internal affair of Slovakia, but an issue of European level". Chairman Gábor Vona called the law "the shame of Europe", by which Slovakia "goes beyond the frameworks of democracy", he called the Slovak politics "aggressive and racist". Vona urged peace between Hungary and Slovakia as he fears there will be a laughing third who profits from the conflicts, naming globalization as a common enemy of the two nations.

==== Hungarian Academy of Sciences ====
The Research Institute for Linguistics of the Hungarian Academy of Sciences published a Statement on the Amendment of the Slovak Language Law, and it has been signed by many people from around the world, including linguists such as Noam Chomsky, Peter Trudgill, Bernard Comrie, Ian Roberts, and Ruth Wodak.

The Ethnic-National Minority Institute of the Hungarian Academy of Sciences analyzed the law and found that "in the interest of protecting and supporting the mother tongue, the Slovak legislature's law amendment violates several basic rights the protection of which is in any case required by international legal obligations". The institute brought an example of a fireman helping an escaping person who does not speak Slovak, and is forced to only reply in Slovak, according to their analysis of the law.

=== International reaction ===
==== OSCE ====
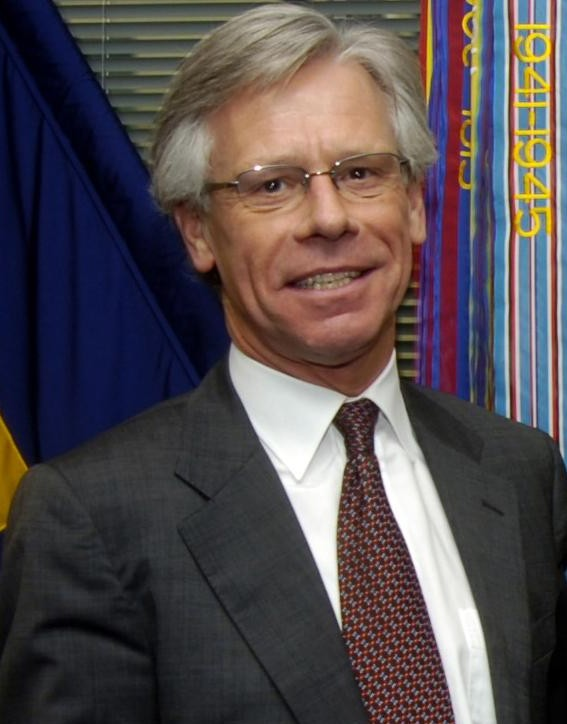
Knut Vollebæk, Organization for Security and Co-operation in Europe High Commissioner on National Minorities concluded that the law does not violate any international standards.

Organization for Security and Co-operation in Europe High Commissioner on National Minorities, Knut Vollebæk, reviewed the law and issued a report in which he concluded that:

When read systematically, it is clear that the extension of the scope of application of the Law does not (and cannot) imply a restriction of the linguistic rights of persons belonging to national minorities.

— Knut Vollebæk

He also stated that the law itself does not violate any international standards or obligations of the Slovak Republic; it is more the perception of the newly enacted possible financial penalisation that can exacerbate the already present tensions. He also called for a very reserved application of the penalisation clause.

The Party of the Hungarian Coalition (MKP) asked the Slovak Government to release communication exchanged between them and Vollebæk so that the opinion of Vollebæk regarding the law could not be misrepresented or distorted. According to the Slovak Ministry of Foreign Affairs the report was released unchanged and in full. Spokesman Peter Stano stated: "It is obvious that the Party of the Hungarian Coalition was unable to question the reliability of the Vollebæk report, that law is following the legitimate goal and it's in accordance with all international norms." Vollebaek will monitor the situation until the law on minority language use will reach the level of the state language law in Slovakia.

==== Slovak Academy of Sciences ====
Slovak linguists from the Ľudovít Štúr Institute of Linguistics of the Slovak Academy of Sciences are reluctant to comment on the amendment, as the issue is highly politicised. In their opinion, however, aside from the fines, the law introduces only minor changes to the wording previously enacted.

==== European Parliament (EP) ====
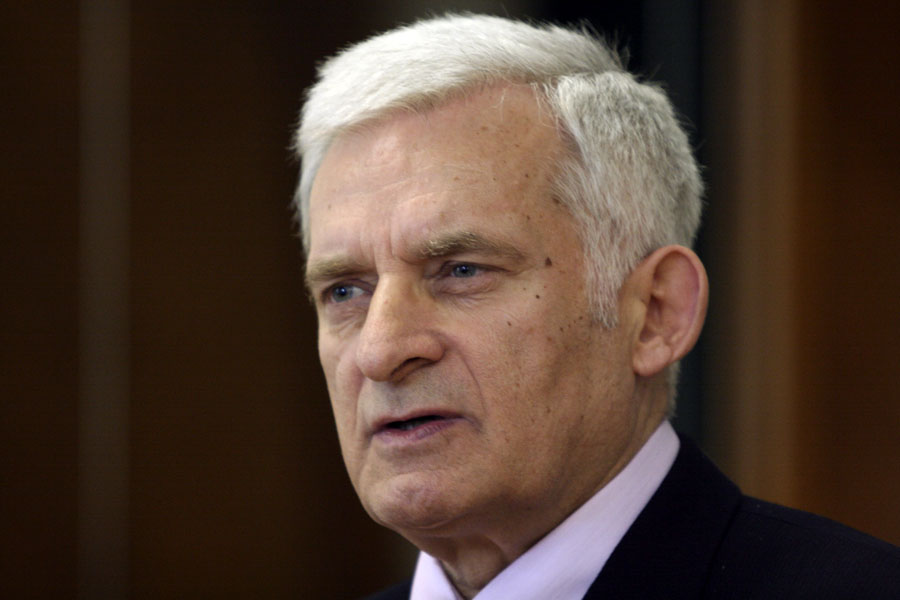
Jerzy Buzek, President of the European Parliament said the issue revolving around the law harms the spirit of European integration and the principles of democracy.

According to the European Bureau for Lesser-Used Languages (EBLUL), the President of the European Parliament, Jerzy Buzek, said the issue was beyond being simply an affair between Slovakia and Hungary and was becoming an issue of the whole European Union because it harms the spirit of European integration and the principles of democracy. However, he said "we need to study it thoroughly in order to find out whether the legal framework has been violated".

Michael Gahler, Member of the European Parliament (MEP) and Vice-Chairman of the European Parliament's Foreign Affairs Committee, also criticized the act, saying Slovak Prime Minister Robert Fico and his coalition partners "have yet neither mentally nor politically arrived in Europe". Gahler stated that Slovakia is violating "commonly respected standards in the EU" and is disregarding the recommendations of the Council of Europe, "which foresee the extended use of minority languages". According to Gahler, Slovakia risks discrediting itself as an EU member and could again become a "totalitarian state" if the new provisions are consistently applied. He suggested that a "modern and open Slovakia communicating and cooperating closely with its neighbours" would be better both for the country and its citizens; however, he does not expect this from the present Slovak government coalition.

==== Federal Union of European Nationalities ====
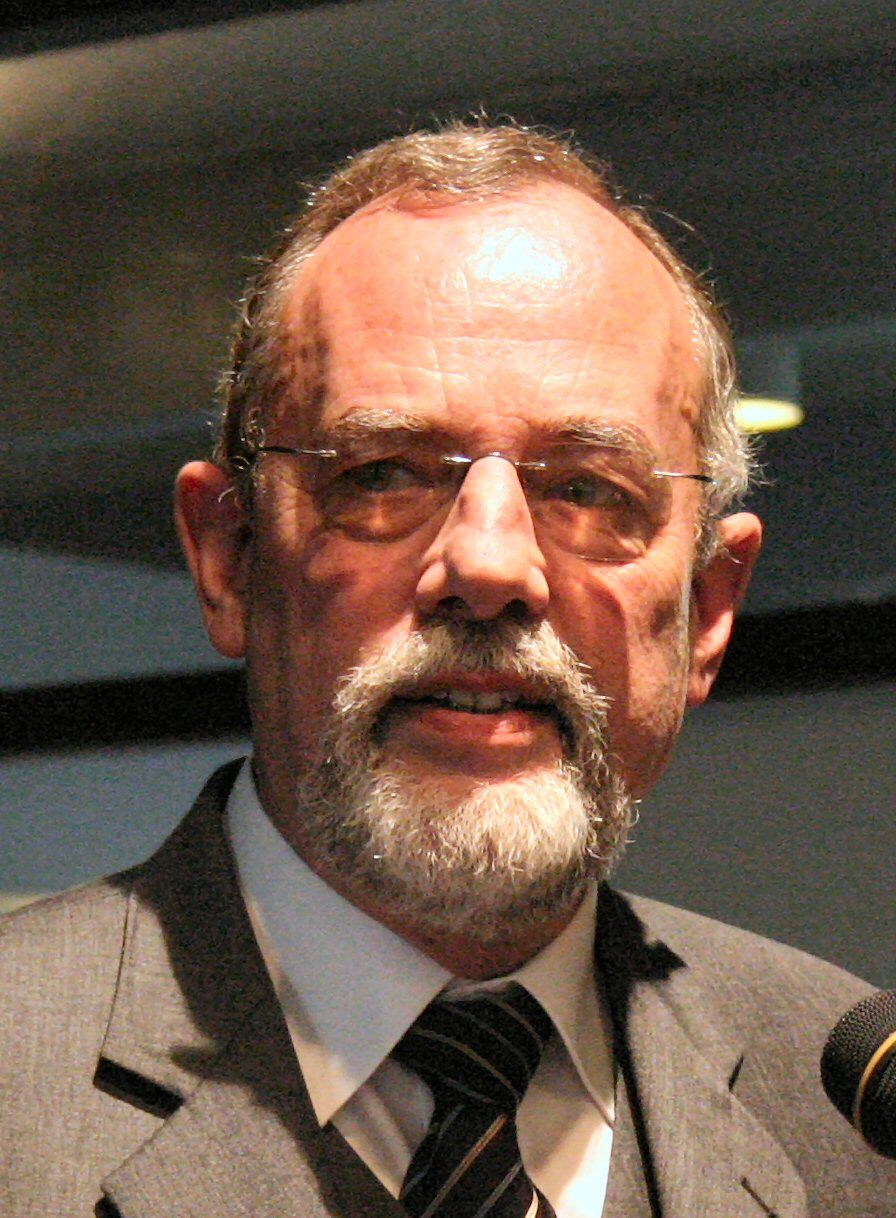
Hans Heinrich Hansen, president of the Federal Union of European Nationalities (FUEN) called the law absurd.

According to Hans Heinrich Hansen, president of the Federal Union of European Nationalities (FUEN), "a language law which makes it a punishable offence to use a language does not belong on the statute books of a European country". He said this law is "totally absurd" and "insane".

FUEN published an article titled "The right to one's own native language – the language law in Slovakia" in which Hansen is quoted as arguing that the authors of the law made their "first main error in reasoning" by failing to realize that "Hungarian is not a foreign language in Slovakia, but the native language of around 500,000 Hungarian-speaking citizens". According to Hansen, Slovakia must protect and promote the native language of all its citizens, also of its Hungarian-speaking citizens.

Hansen recommended examination of a good example of minority treatment, that of the Swedish-speaking population in Finland. He promised that FUEN will speak in Brussels about the issue of the law.

==== Forum Minority Research Institute ====
Kálmán Petőcz of the independent Forum Minority Research Institute in Slovakia told IPS that the law "could be seen as an expression of the superiority of Slovaks over all other nationalities in Slovakia". He said it only serves to worsen the everyday relations between Slovaks and ethnic Hungarians, and also quoted research "showing that many young Slovak schoolchildren have prejudiced attitudes towards their Hungarian counterparts".

Petőcz thinks some politicians in the government are "clearly nationalist and anti-Hungarian", however he sees most of the government as "just populist", who try to find "any 'enemy' to pick on and use that to win votes".

László Ollós, a political analyst of the same institute, criticized the law for being too ambiguous, in order "to give as much power as possible to bureaucrats, so that they alone can decide when to apply the law and when not to".

=== Demonstrations ===
On September 1, ethnic Hungarians of Slovakia held a demonstration in the stadium of Dunajská Streda (Hungarian: Dunaszerdahely) against the law. The BBC gives the number of protesters as around 10,000, but the Slovak paper Pravda cites only 6,000. The event was attended by several hundred extremists, mostly Hungarian nationals, who expressed their vocal support for a territorial autonomy and chanted "Death to Trianon". These were not addressed directly nor denounced ex post by the organizing party of SMK and its leader Pál Csaky. The attendees also claimed that they were "not protesting against Slovaks in general, they were protesting the fact, that they have no rights whatsoever as a national minority". All the major Slovak political parties denounced the meeting as counterproductive feat, that will only exacerbate the tension.

== 2011 amendments ==
After 2010 elections new government repealed controversial parts introduced by 2009 amendment. The Slovak Culture Ministry reported that the amendment has removed ‘nonsensical restrictions and limitations concerning national minorities’. “We claim that the era of fear, when citizens were afraid to speak their language in public offices regardless of whether they had a reason to be afraid or not, has ended,” said Béla Bugár chairman of Most-Híd, after the amendment was agreed.

== Post-2011 implementation and legal challenges ==
While national legislation formally upholds the protection of minority language use through the Constitution of the Slovak Republic, the 1995 State Language Act, the 1999 Minority Language Act, and the Act on Education of 2008, implementation has at times been regarded as ambiguous and insufficient, resulting in differing outcomes in practice. Reported challenges include the non-recognition of bilingual personal documents, as highlighted in Case 23Sa/88/2020 before the Regional Court in Nitra (2022), the refusal to issue bilingual documents such as birth certificates,^{,} the prohibition of erecting minority-language monuments, as in Case 9Sp/6/2014 (2015), and the non-recognition of documents in minority languages in the absence of explicit claims of minority affiliation.

== The 2024 Proposal Amendment to the State Language Act ==
In November 2024, the Ministry of Culture of the Slovak Republic proposed an amendment to the State Language Act, stating that its purpose was to “strengthen the position of the Slovak language.” While the Ministry emphasized that the measure would not affect national minorities, representatives of minority parties and legal experts expressed concerns about its potential consequences.

== See also ==
- Hungary-Slovakia relations

== Bibliography ==
- ACFC/SR, Advisory Committee on the Framework Convention for the Protection of National Minorities / Slovak Republic (3 January 2005). "Second Report submitted by the Slovak Republic pursuant to Article 25, Paragraph 1 of the Framework Convention for the Protection of National Minorities (ACFC/SR/II(2005)001)". Secretariat of the Framework Convention for the Protection of National Minorities (FCNM).
- ACFC, Advisory Committee on the Framework Convention for the Protection of National Minorities (2 February 2022). "Fifth Opinion on the Slovak Republic". Secretariat of the Framework Convention for the Protection of National Minorities (FCNM).
- Bartole, Sergio (21 October 2010). "CDL-AD(2010)035 – Opinion on the Act on the State Language of the Slovak Republic". Venice Commission.
- Daftary, Farimah; Gál, Kinga (September 2000). The new Slovak language law: Internal of external politics? (PDF). ECMI Working Paper No. 8. Flensburg, Germany: European Centre for Minority Issues (ECMI). ISSN 1435-9812.(Archived version).
- National Council of the Slovak Republic (February 2020). "Act of the National Council of the Slovak Republic on the State Language of the Slovak Republic" (PDF). Ministry of Culture (Slovakia). (official English translation of the State Language Act as of February 2020)
