= János Németh =

János Németh may refer to:

- János Németh (water polo)
- János Németh (jurist)
