= 2005 Hungarian presidential election =

- 6–7 June 2005

Needed to win: Two-thirds of all members of the National Assembly (first and second ballot), majority of voting MPs (third ballot) First and second ballot: 386 MPs, 257 votes needed to win Third ballot: 367 voting MPs, 184 votes needed to win
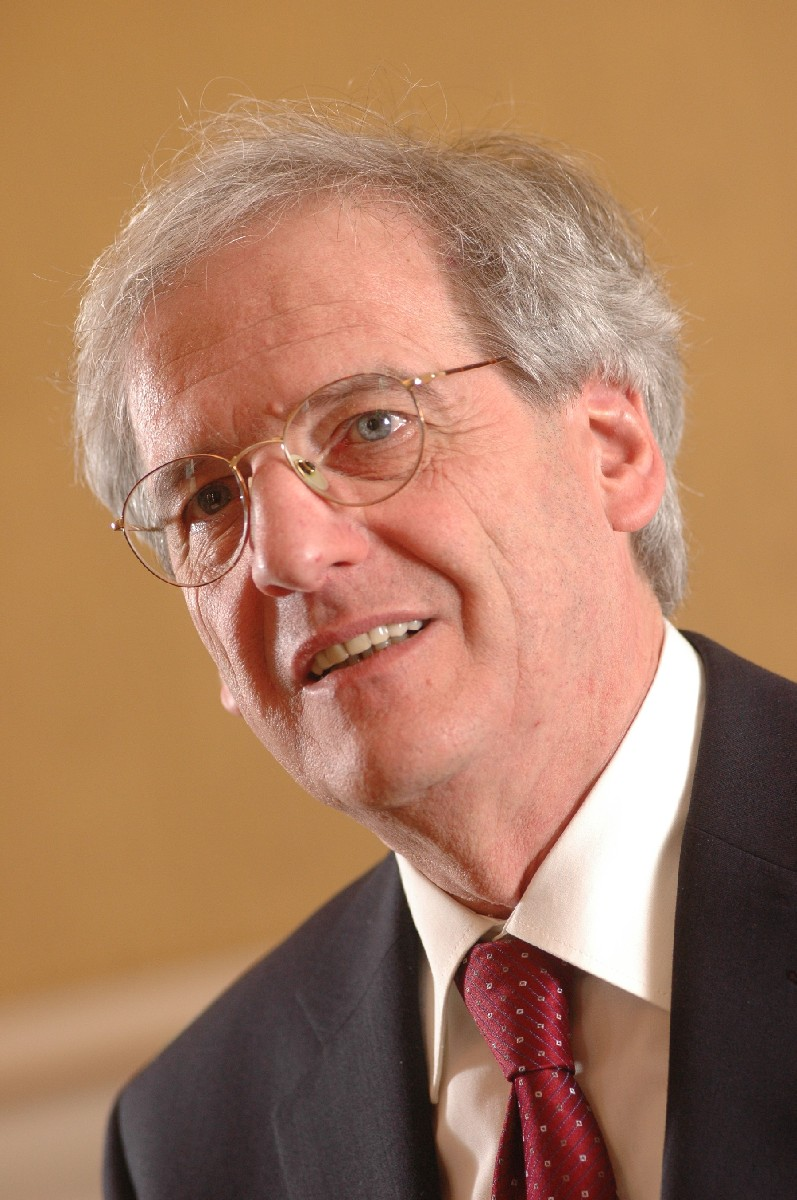

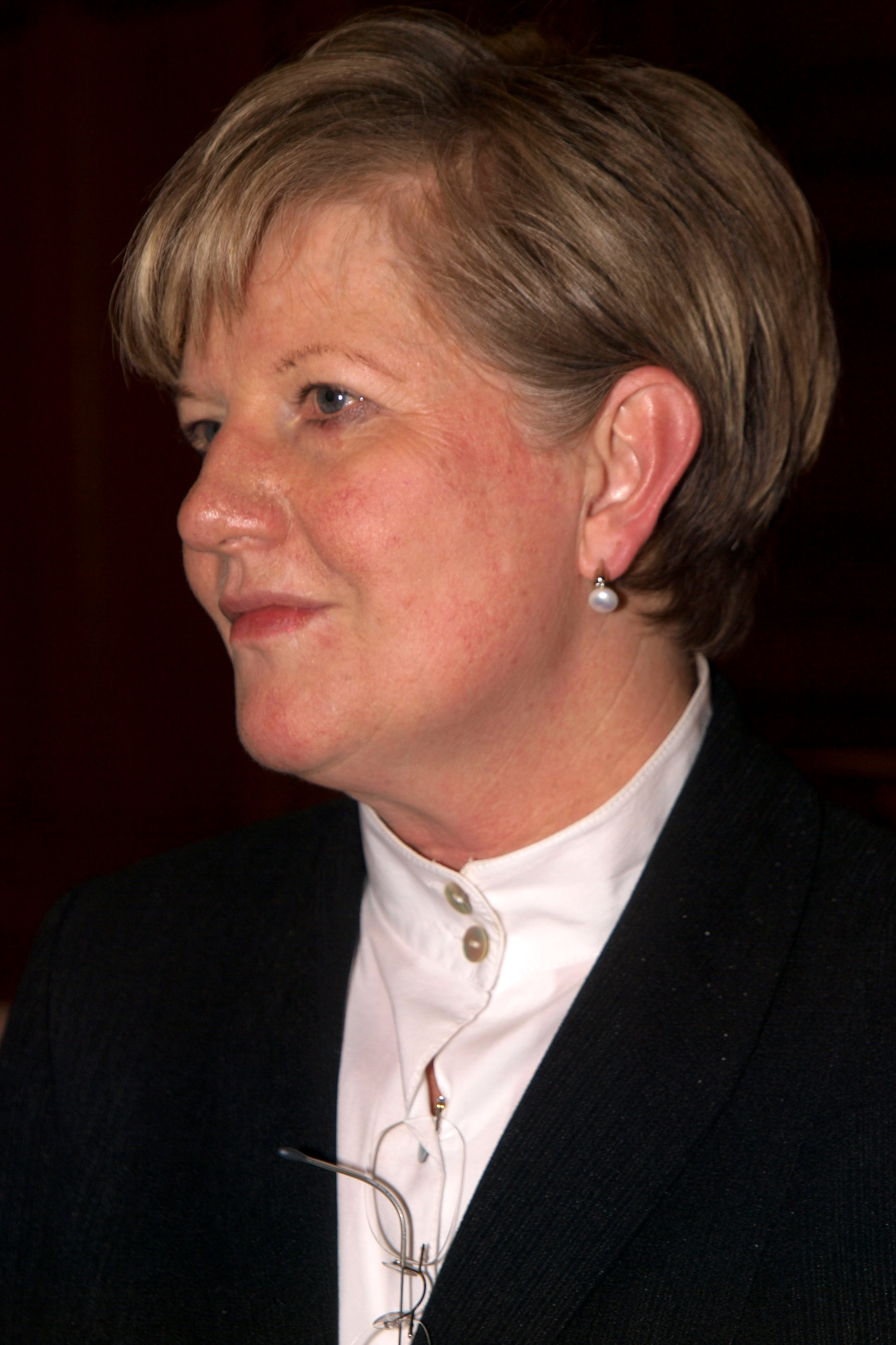
Nominee	László Sólyom	Katalin Szili
Party	Independent	MSZP
Alliance	Fidesz–MDF
Electoral vote	185	182
Percentage	50.41%	49.59%
President before election
Ferenc Mádl
Independent
Elected President
László Sólyom
Independent

An indirect presidential election was held in Hungary on 6–7 June 2005. Incumbent President Ferenc Mádl, was eligible for a second term, but did not seek for re-election. Former President of the Constitutional Court László Sólyom was elected with an absolute majority. This was the closest election since 1990 and the last one which was not won by the candidate of the ruling party.

== Results ==
Candidate	Party	First round		Second round		Third round	
Candidate	Party	Votes	%	Votes	%	Votes	%
Katalin Szili	Hungarian Socialist Party	183	93.37	178	49.04	182	49.59
László Sólyom	Independent	13	6.63	185	50.96	185	50.41
Total		196	100.00	363	100.00	367	100.00
Valid votes		196	98.49	363	99.45	367	99.73
Invalid/blank votes		3	1.51	2	0.55	1	0.27
Total votes		199	100.00	365	100.00	368	100.00
Registered voters/turnout		385	51.69	385	94.81	385	95.58
Source: Parliament, Pestiside
