= László Sólyom =

President of Hungary from 2005 to 2010

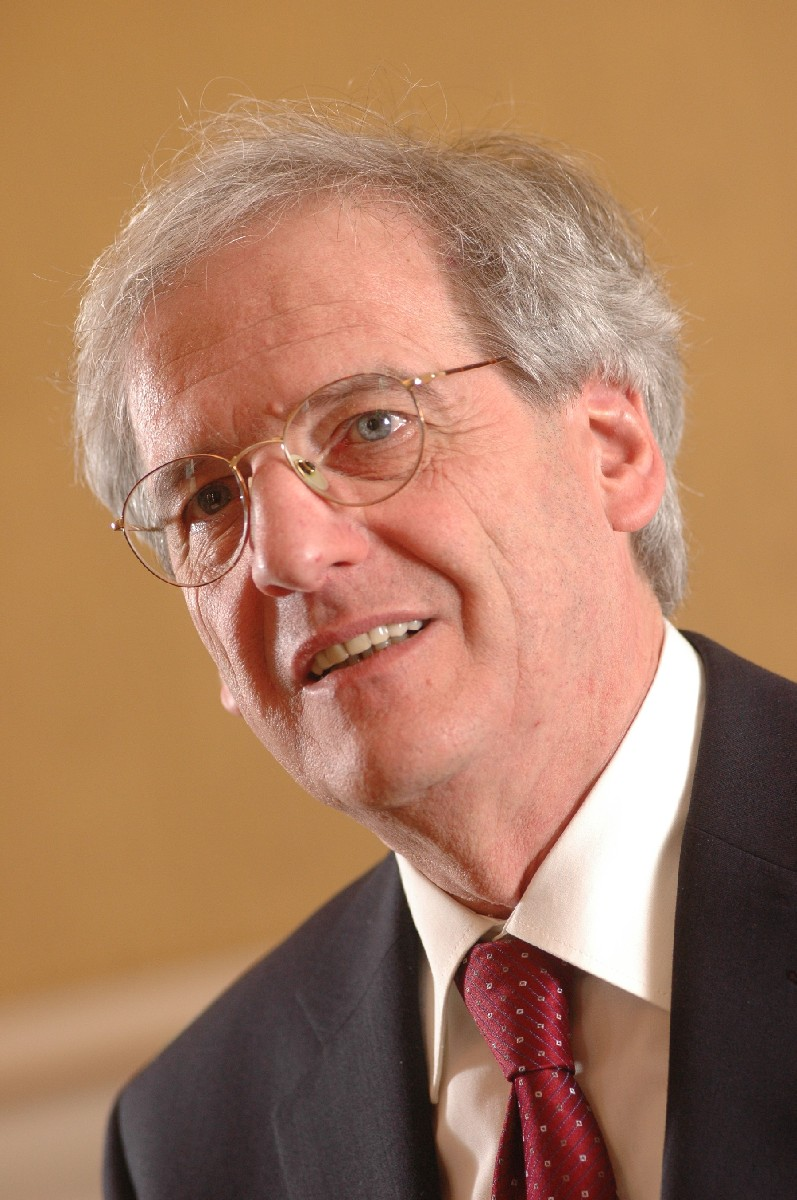
- Sólyom in 2009

President of Hungary
- In office 5 August 2005 – 5 August 2010
- Prime Minister: Ferenc Gyurcsány; Gordon Bajnai; Viktor Orbán
- Preceded by: Ferenc Mádl
- Succeeded by: Pál Schmitt

President of the Constitutional Court
- In office 1 August 1990 – 24 November 1998
- Preceded by: Position established
- Succeeded by: János Németh

Personal details
- Born: 3 January 1942 Pécs, Kingdom of Hungary
- Died: 8 October 2023 (aged 81) Budapest, Hungary
- Party: Independent (from 1989)
- Other political affiliations: Hungarian Democratic Forum (1987–1989)
- Spouse: Erzsébet Nagy (m. 1966; died 2015)
- Children: 2
- Education: University of Pécs (JD)

László Sólyom (Note: Hungarian pronunciation: [ˈlaːsloː ˈʃoːjom]) (3 January 1942 – 8 October 2023) was a Hungarian politician, lawyer, and librarian who was President of Hungary from 2005 until 2010. Previously he was the first president of the Constitutional Court of Hungary from 1990 to 1998.

A prominent jurist and pro-democracy activist, Sólyom became the first president of the Constitutional Court at a time when the country was in the final years of its democratic transition after decades of communist rule. During his mandate, the Court declared the death penalty unconstitutional, strengthened the protection of freedom of expression and conscience, and legitimated the domestic partnerships of homosexuals.

Later, in 2005, he was elected president of Hungary, a largely ceremonial position, as an independent candidate. He held this office until 2010.

== Early life ==
László Sólyom was born on 3 January 1942 in Pécs, Kingdom of Hungary, the son of lawyer Ferenc Sólyom and Aranka Lelkes. On 24 October 1956, Sólyom joined an anti-communist demonstration with his fellow students of the Széchenyi István High School.

He began his studies in law and political science at the University of Pécs in 1960, graduating in 1965. Sólyom also trained to become a librarian at the National Széchényi Library between 1963 and 1965. In 1966, Ferenc Mádl, who was then the Secretary of the Legal Department of the Hungarian Academy of Sciences, offered him an assistant professorship at the University of Jena's Institute of Civil Law, earning his doctorate in German Civil Law in 1969. In 1977 he published the first of his essays on law, whose main object of study was the protection of people and the environment. Sólyom earned a doctorate in Political and Legal Sciences in 1981.

Back in Hungary, Sólyom started working as a researcher and began teaching in 1983 at the Civil Law Department of the Faculty of Law and Political Science of the Eötvös Loránd University. In 1984, he completed another academic internship at the Max Planck Institute for Foreign and International Private Law and in 1988 he did research at the University of Frankfurt. Years later, in 1993, Sólyom began teaching at the Pázmány Péter Catholic University and, since 2002, at the Andrássy University Budapest.

Already in the mid-1980s, he worked as a legal advisor for various civic and environmental movements, joining the environmental organization Duna Kör in 1984 and participating in their protests, such as those against the construction of the Gabčíkovo-Nagymaros Dams. In the 1980s, Sólyom participated in civic organizations that contributed to the democratic transition in the country. In 1988 and 1989 Sólyom was the secretary of the Publicity Club, and he became a member of the board of the Independent Lawyers' Forum in 1989. He also participated in the meeting in Lakitelek on 27 September 1987 with other intellectuals opposed to the János Kádár regime and where he became of the founding members of the then-illegal Hungarian Democratic Forum. Sólyom became member of the Hungarian Democratic Forum's executive in 1989 and was in charge of the constitutional reform proposals. He was also a member of the Opposition Round Table Talks, which was a set of meetings to design the legal and political basis for post-communist Hungary.

== President of the Constitutional Court of Hungary (1989–1998) ==
Throughout his legal career, Sólyom acquired a reputation for his academic accomplishments and for his doctrinal development of privacy rights. This led to his appointment as a judge of the newly established Constitutional Court of Hungary by the National Assembly on 24 November 1989, becoming its first president in 1990. Sólyom abandoned his political affiliations but not his work as a university professor. This new court was entrusted with the task of overseeing the constitutional revisions that had been introduced the previous month.

In this role, he significantly contributed to the abolition of capital punishment, the protection of information and environmental rights, the freedom of opinion and of conscience, as well as the constitutional protection of domestic partnerships of homosexuals, the Justice Act, the status of the President of the Republic, the constitutional content of the referendum, legislation on abortion and the law on compensation, which measures brought wide international acclaim for the Constitutional Court of Hungary. The Court, with this activity, helped lead to the democratic transition in Hungary and the establishment of a parliamentary democracy.

Sólyom had a controversial principle of "activism" based on the "invisible constitution", shaping the decisions of the court by the "spirit" or "morals" of the Constitution rather than its explicitly written terms, advocating the principle of equality and human dignity even over the language of the constitution. In his concurring opinion in the judgement on the unconstitutionality of capital punishment he writes: "In this context, the starting point is the Constitution as a whole. The Constitutional Court must continue its effort to explain the theoretical bases of the Constitution and the rights included in it and to form a coherent system with its decisions which as an "invisible Constitution" provides for a reliable standard of constitutionality beyond the Constitution, which nowadays is often amended out of current political interests." He also called for the possibility of the Constitutional Court to modify laws that can be declared unconstitutional so as not to annul them completely.

Sólyom's term of office ended on 24 November 1998 and was succeeded by János Németh. He continued his scholarly career, continued giving lectures in universities, and became founder of Védegylet, an environmentalist and civil rights non-governmental organisation in 2000. Sólyom became member of the International Commission of Jurists and the National Science Research Fund Programmes. In 2002, Prime Minister Péter Medgyessy appointed Sólyom as head of the advisory committee of the bill to make public the collaboration of officials of the current government and administration with the secret police of the late communist regime.

== President of Hungary (2005–2010) ==
In view of the 2005 Hungarian presidential election, in February 2005, 110 personalities sent, as representatives of the Védegylet organization, intellectuals and artists, an open letter to the members of the National Assembly, to elect Sólyom as the next president of the Republic, as they saw in him a "non-partisan person who looks beyond the political considerations of the moment".

In the third round of the elections, on 7 June 2005, Solyom was elected by the National Assembly as the new President of Hungary, receiving 185 votes, three votes more than the Hungarian Socialist Party candidate Katalin Szili, although there were reports of voting irregularities. He was subsequently sworn into office.

László Sólyom was inaugurated in his office at a ceremony in the Mirror Hall of Sándor Palace on 4 August, effectively beginning his term of office on 5 August.

In March 2006 he refused to shake hands with János Fekete, former vice president of the Hungarian National Bank before the end of Communism in Hungary. The incident happened while presenting an award to Fekete that the Gyurcsány cabinet forced through, despite strong objections to that nomination due to Fekete's past as a hardline communist.

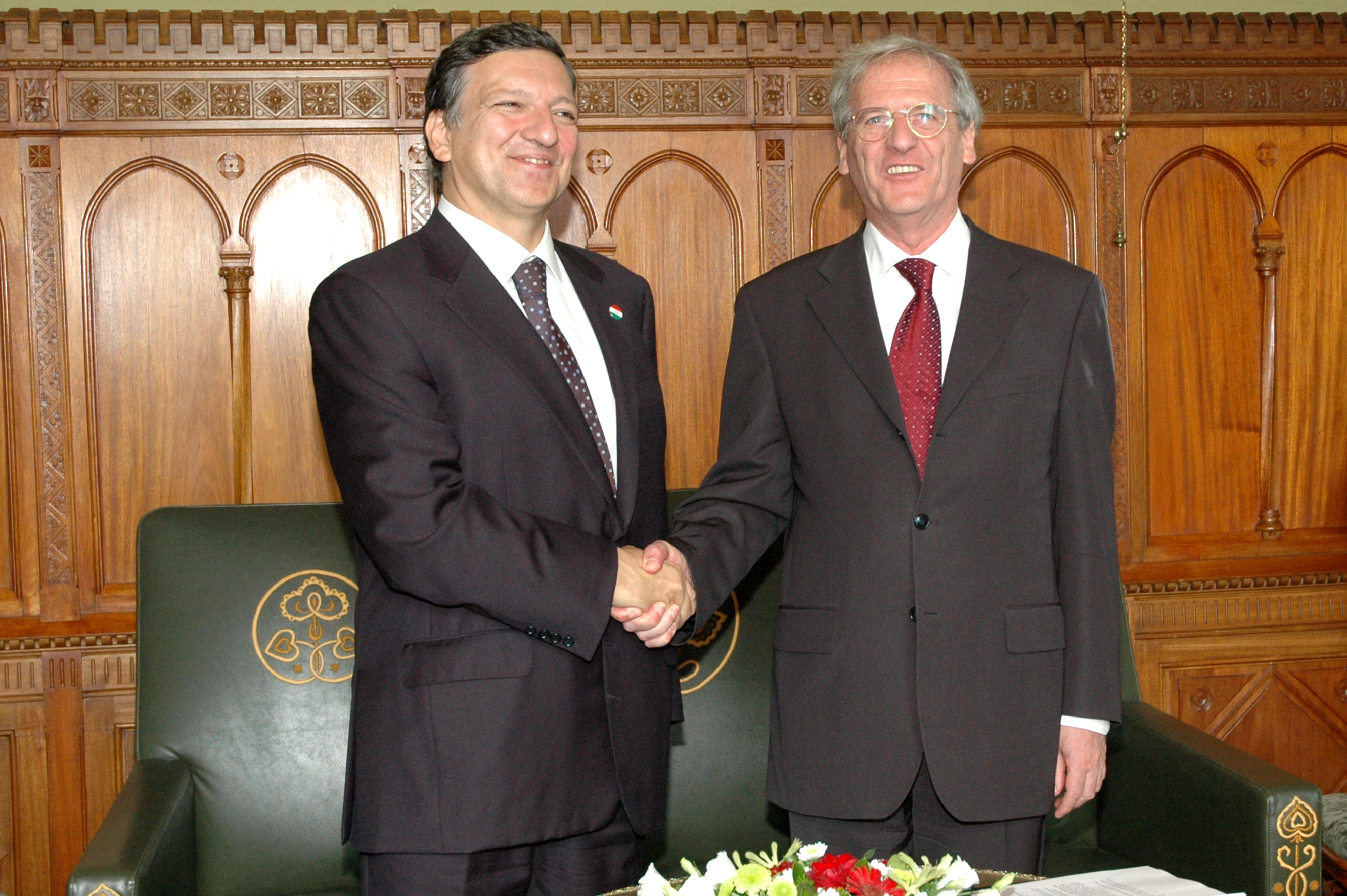
Sólyom with President of the European Commission José Manuel Barroso on 22 October 2006

On 26 June 2006, while the President of the United States George W. Bush was visiting Hungary to commemorate the fiftieth anniversary of the 1956 Hungarian uprising, Sólyom told him that "this fight against terrorism can be successful only if every step and measure taken are in line with international law", a comment that many media interpreted as a subtle criticism of the Iraq War.

Following the outbreak of anti-government protests in September 2006 that soon became violent, Sólyom called unsuccessfully on Prime Minister Ferenc Gyurcsány to resign, accusing him of lying to the people and provoking a "moral crisis" in the country after the latter admitted that he had repeatedly lied about the country's economic situation. In 2006, a published poll showed that Sólyom was the most trusted politician in the country.

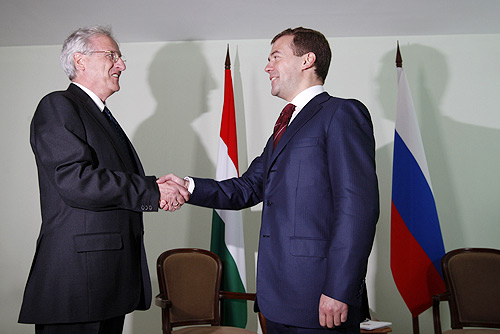
Sólyom with Russian President Dmitry Medvedev on 28 June 2008

In 2007, he refused to award a similar distinction to Gyula Horn. He referred to the fact that Horn had not changed his views on the 1956 revolution in which he had taken part on the Soviet side, fighting against the Hungarian revolutionaries. Sólyom said that this (i.e., Horn's opinion) conflicts with the constitutional values of the Republic of Hungary, and that he could not give the award to Horn, despite his merits.

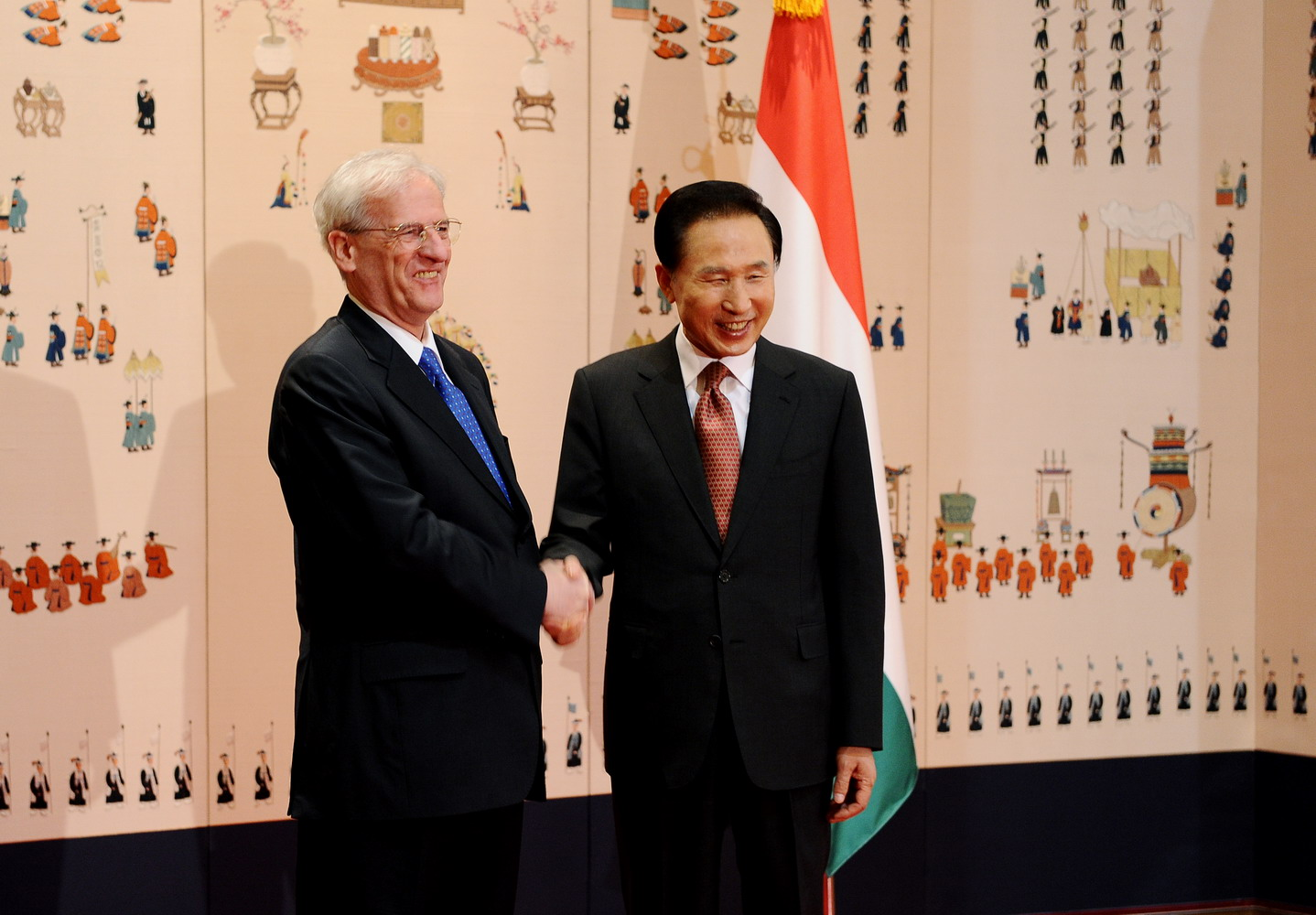
Sólyom with South Korean president Lee Myung-bak in Seoul, 1 December 2009

In 2009, Sólyom was refused entry to Slovakia to attend the dedication of a statue of King Saint Stephen in the border town of Komárno on 21 August, an incident reported in Hungary as tantamount to a declaration of persona non grata which further worsened already tense Hungary–Slovakia relations. Sólyom said that "this is a situation unheard of, inexcusable and unexplainable in the relationship of two allied countries." Slovakia's government, containing the ultranationalist SNS party, claimed that the Hungarian President's presence is a "threat to national security". Sólyom came back to visit the same statue a year later in August 2010, after Slovak voters ousted the previous government; the ceremony at the statue took place without incident. The Court of Justice of the European Union ruled in October 2012 that the prohibition on his entry into Slovakia in 2009 did not compromise his freedom of movement as an EU citizen because his role as a Head of State justified a limit, based on international law, to his right to freedom of movement.

On 5 August 2010, Sólyom was succeeded as president by Pál Schmitt.

=== Post-presidency ===
During the processing of the 2011 constitution of Hungary, Sólyom stated that "the drafting process had lost its dignity by descending to the level of common parliamentary squabbles".

After his mandate, he established scholarships to help young Hungarian researchers to study in other countries. He was very critical of the Viktor Orbán government. Sólyom published his three-volume professional memoir and summary Documenta in 2019.

== Personal life and death ==
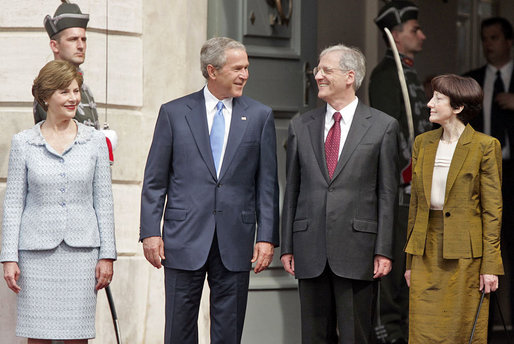
László Sólyom and his wife Erzsébet Sólyom (far right) with US President George W. Bush and his wife Laura Bush, 22 June 2006

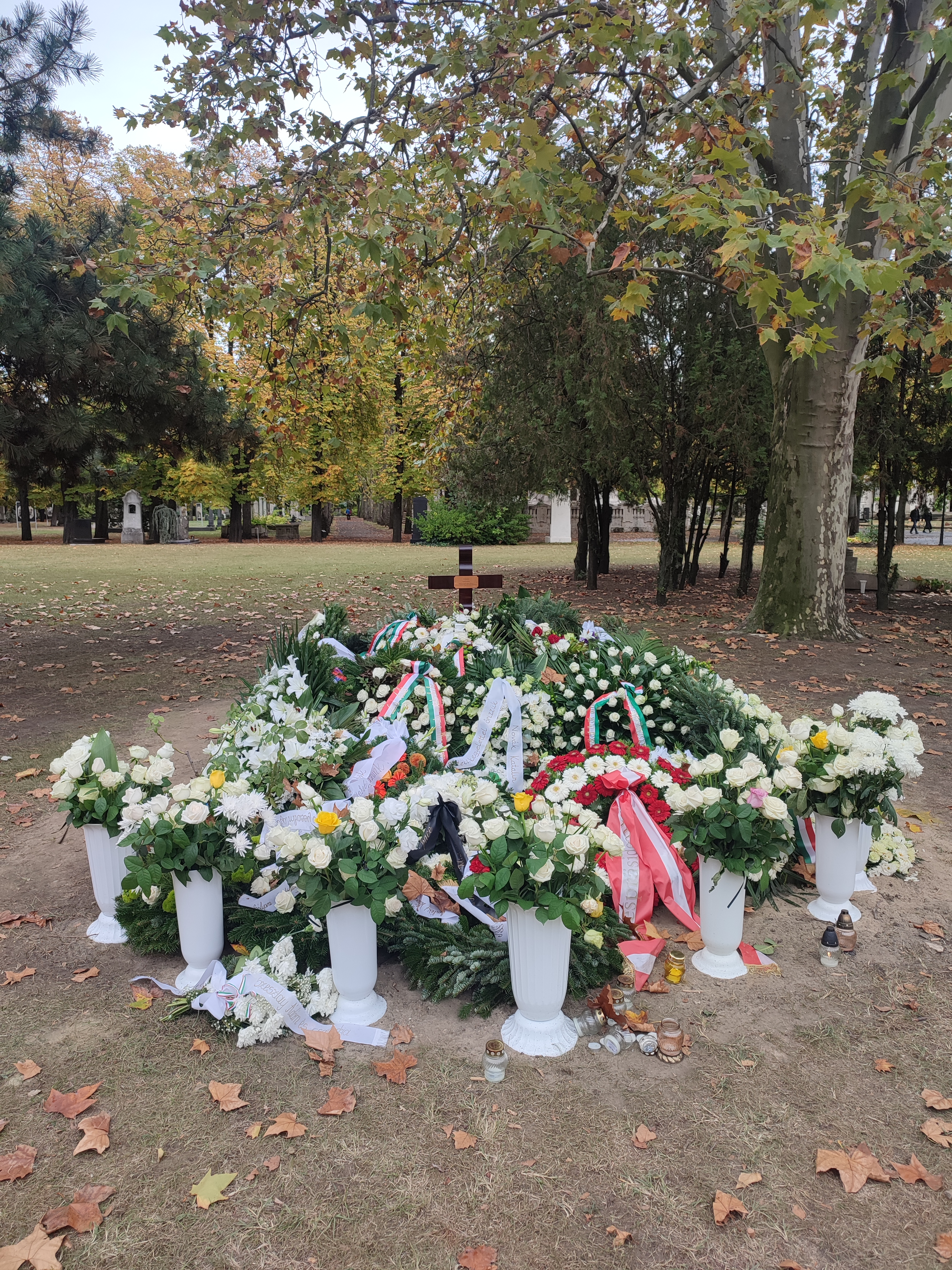
Grave of László Sólyom in the Fiume Road Graveyard, Budapest

In 1966, he married a school teacher named Erzsébet (née Nagy; 1944–2015), a fellow student at the Pécs Conservatory. They had two children: Beáta Sólyom and Benedek Sólyom, as well as eleven grandchildren and four great-grandchildren. His wife kept a low profile during Sólyom's presidency and participated in events for disabled children, large families and the elderly, staying away from protocol events. She died in February 2015 at the age of 73 after a long illness, for which reason he gradually abandoned his public life.

He was Catholic. After his retirement, Sólyom translated many theologian works into Hungarian. After his wife's death, Sólyom walked Camino de Santiago on foot. He also passed a pilot's licence in his old age. Sólyom frequently volunteered at the Hungarian Charity Service of the Order of Malta.

Sólyom died of cancer on 8 October 2023, at age 81, in Budapest. The religious funeral took place on 18 October at the Fiume Road Graveyard. His funeral was attended by numerous politicians and public figures, including incumbent head of state Katalin Novák, former presidents Pál Schmitt and János Áder, house speaker László Kövér, cardinal Péter Erdő and apostolic nuncio Michael Banach, in addition to various members of the Hungarian government and opposition parties.

== Awards and honours ==
- Humboldt Prize (1998)
- Hungary: Grand Cross of the Order of Merit of the Republic of Hungary (1999)
- Germany: Grand Cross with Star and Sash of the Order of Merit of the Federal Republic of Germany (1998)
- Imre Nagy Medal (2003)
- Estonia: Grand Cross of the Order of the Cross of Terra Mariana (27 March 2006)
- Latvia: Grand Cross of the Order of the Three Stars (31 August 2006)
- Lithuania: Grand Cross with Chain of the Order of Vytautas the Great (31 August 2006)
- Finland: Grand Cross with Collar of the Order of the White Rose of Finland (2006)
- Spain: Knight of the Collar of the Order of Isabella the Catholic (25 May 2007)
- Malta: Grand Cross with Chain of the National Order of Merit (31 May 2007)
- Algeria: Collar of the National Order of Merit (2 June 2007)
- Kazakhstan: First Class of the Order of Friendship (23 November 2007)
- Ukraine: Grand Cross with Chain of the Order of Prince Yaroslav the Wise (7 July 2008)
- Peru: Grand Cross with Diamonds of the Order of the Sun of Peru (24 September 2008)
- Hungarian Freedom Prize (2013)

Legal offices
New office	President of the Constitutional Court; 1990–1998	Succeeded by János Németh
Political offices
Preceded by Ferenc Mádl	President of Hungary; 2005–2010	Succeeded by Pál Schmitt
