= Tibor Bastrnák =

Slovak politician (born 1964)

Member of the National Council
- In office 15 October 2002 – 20 March 2020

Personal details
- Born: 17 November 1964 (age 61) Šahy, Czechoslovakia
- Party: Party of the Hungarian Community; Most–Híd
- Children: Kristóf, Bastrnák
- Education: Masaryk University

Tibor Bastrnák (born 17 November 1964) is a Slovak politician. He served as a member of the National Council in 2002–2020 in the Party of the Hungarian Community caucus (until 2009) and from 2009 in the Most–Híd caucus. As a senior member of Most-Híd, he was among the supporters of coalition with Direction – Slovak Social Democracy.

In addition to national politics, Bastrnák served the major of Komárno in 2003–2010.

Bastrnák studied medicine at the Masaryk University. Following his graduation, he worked as a gynecologist in a local hospital in Komárno.
