= Hungary–Slovakia relations =

Bilateral relations

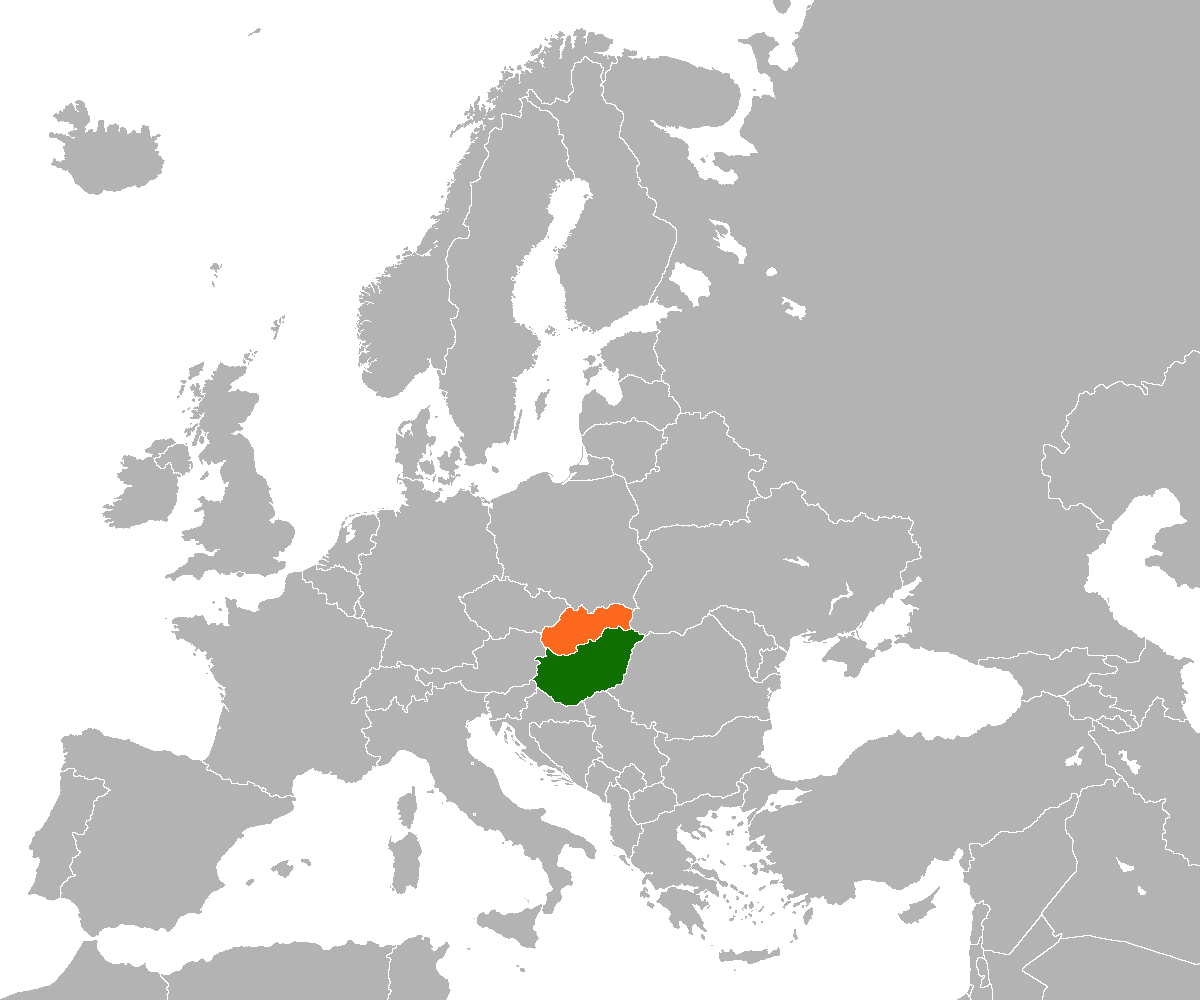

- Hungary: Slovakia

Hungary and Slovakia are two neighboring countries in Central Europe. There are two major periods of official foreign relations between them in contemporary history. The first period included relations between the Kingdom of Hungary and the first Slovak Republic in 1939–1945. The second period started in 1993, when the countries again established diplomatic relations, the year when Slovakia became independent of Czechoslovakia. Hungary has an embassy in Bratislava and a general consulate in Košice, and in Nitra, and Slovakia has an embassy in Budapest and a general consulate in Békéscsaba.

After the first break-up of Czechoslovakia in March 1939, Hungary was the first state which officially recognized the independent Slovakia. Subsequently, Hungary and Slovakia established embassies in Bratislava and Budapest and kept diplomatic relations during World War Two. Despite a formal alliance inside the Berlin pact (1940) and a common war against the Allies, Slovak-Hungarian political relations maintained on the brink of war due to the frontier dispute and the oppression of Slovak minority in Hungary and Hungarians in Slovakia. The restoration of Czechoslovakia and the liquidation of the Slovak puppet state in 1945 led to the end of the first period of Hungary-Slovakia's relations.

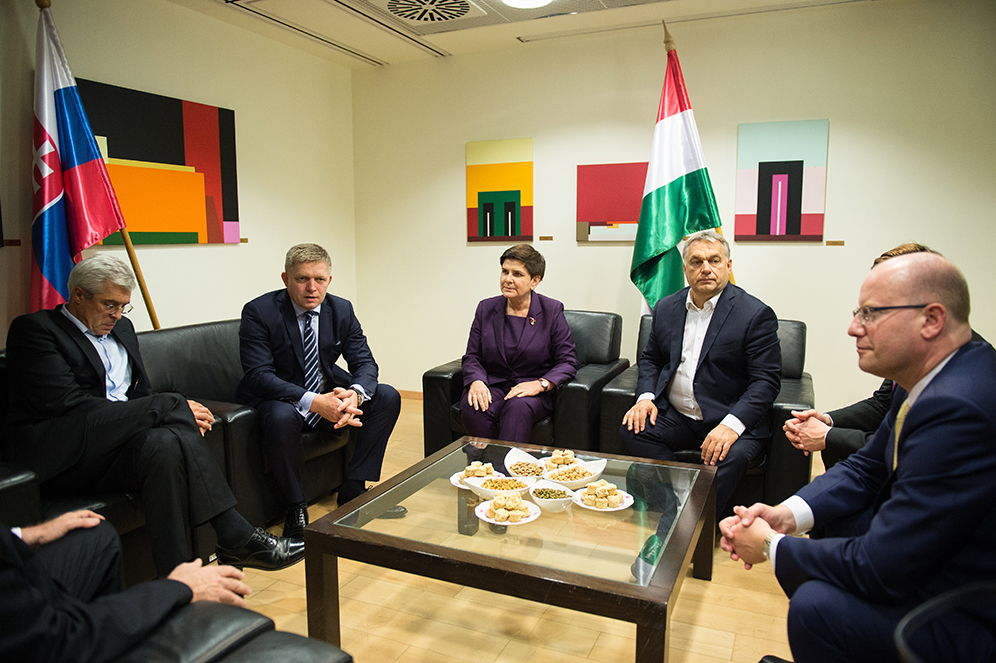
Fico with Hungarian prime minister Viktor Orbán in Brussels, 18 October 2017

Nowadays, both countries are full members of the Council of Europe, the European Union, NATO and of the Visegrád Group. They share 676 kilometres (420 mi) of common borders. There are approximately 520,000 persons of Hungarian descent living in Slovakia (about 9.7% of its population) and around 39,266 persons of Slovak descent living in Hungary (about 0.38% of its population). (Note: According to 2001 Hungarian census) There have been frequent minor diplomatic conflicts between the two countries, which have also collaborated on several issues.

== Country comparison ==
| | Hungary Hungary (Magyarország) | Slovakia Slovak Republic (Slovenská republika) |
|---|---|---|
| Flag & Coat of arms | Hungary | Slovakia |
| Population | 9,772,756 | 5,450,421 |
| Area | 93,028 km^{2} (35,919 sq mi) | 49,035 km^{2} (18,933 sq mi) |
| Population Density | 105.1/km^{2} (272.2/sq mi) | 111/km^{2} (287.5/sq mi) |
| Government | Unitary parliamentary constitutional republic | Unitary parliamentary constitutional republic |
| Capital | Budapest – 1,759,407 (2,524,697 Metro) | Bratislava – 475,503 |
| Largest City | Budapest – 1,759,407 (2,524,697 Metro) | Bratislava – 475,503 |
| Current leader | President András Baka; Prime Minister Péter Magyar | President Peter Pellegrini; Prime Minister Robert Fico |
| Official language | Hungarian (de facto and de jure) | Slovak (de facto and de jure) |

== Economy ==
A mutual trade plays an important role in the economy of both countries. In 2015, Slovakia was the 3rd most important export territory of Hungary. Hungary was among the top ten most important countries for Slovakia (export: the 6th place, import: the 8th place). Hungarian companies belong to the largest investors in Slovakia. In 2012, the total amount of Hungarian investments in Slovakia reached 2,096,2 mld. EUR.

Export and import from Slovakia to Hungary
| Thousand (EUR) | 2010 | 2011 | 2012 | 2013 | 2014 | 2015 |
|---|---|---|---|---|---|---|
| Export | 3,209,472 | 3,991,787 | 4,523,400 | 4,019,900 | 3,954,800 | 3,786,500 |
| Import | 2,049,302 | 2,194,750 | 2,143,000 | 2,633,700 | 2,816,700 | 3,165,500 |
| Total | 5,258,774 | 6,186,537 | 6,666,400 | 6,653,600 | 6,771,500 | 6,951,000 |

== History ==
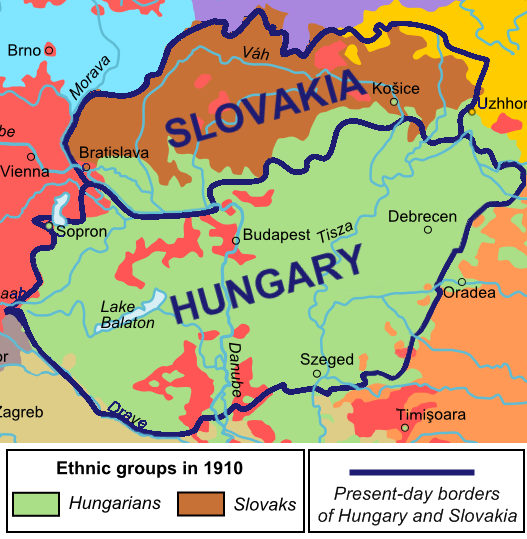
Anachronistic pre-World War I language map, overlain with modern state borders.

Slavs arrived to the Western Carpathians in the 6th century. In the early 9th century most of the Western Carpathians belonged to Great Moravia. By 896, Hungarian Tribes established Hungary with the entire Carpathian Mountain range as its borders and included the Pannonian Basin, including the western portions of Great Moravia.

The Czech National Revival in the neighboring Austrian lands significantly affected Slovak national sentiment, and use of Slovak which was being encroached upon by nationally sanctioned dominance of Hungarian. Following World War I, areas designated by the Allied states (predominantly France, in defiance of Woodrow Wilson's Fourteen Points) which called for plebiscites, Northern Hungary was ceded to the newly established Czechoslovakia, according to the Treaty of Trianon (1920). The arrangement left a sizable Hungarian population residing on the territory of Slovakia and a much smaller Slovak minority in Hungary. The Hungarian Soviet Republic subsequently attempted to retake Hungarian portions of Czechoslovakia, but was defeated by a Czechoslovak-Romanian coalition.

=== Hungarians in Czechoslovakia in 1920-1938 ===
After the break-up of Austria-Hungary, the newly proclaimed Czechoslovakia quickly established diplomatic contacts with Hungary in November 1918. However, due to their parallel aspirations to control Upper Hungary, bilateral relations worsened. Both parties promised to grant the proposed Slovakia special rights, but in May - August 1919, a military conflict erupted between them. Eventually, the war led to the occupation of Upper-Hungary and Carpathian Ruthenia by Czechoslovak troops. Diplomatic relations between Hungary and Czechoslovakia were re-established following the signature of the Treaty of Trianon of 4 June 1920, which set the new borders between the two countries by ceding much of Upper-Hungary to the new Czechoslovak state. Nevertheless, Hungary still hoped that some of its lost territories, particularly the southern strip inhabited by the Magyars, might be returned by diplomatic dialogue or a military attack. Immediately after its foundation, strong anti-Hungarian sentiment manifested in Czechoslovakia and many historical monuments representing the Austro-Hungarian Empire were destroyed. The Elisabeth Science University was disbanded after Hungarian professors refused to take an oath of allegiance, and was replaced by Comenius University to fulfill demands for qualified experts in Slovakia. Comenius University remained the only university in inter-war Slovakia.

Hungarians (and other minorities, e.g., Germans and Rusyns) were thus not present in the constituent assembly and had no influence on the new Czechoslovak constitution. It nevertheless guaranteed minority rights and the use of minority languages in the educational system and local representation. The Hungarian minority in Slovakia had a complete education network, except for canceled colleges. The Czechoslovak Ministry of Education derived its policy from international agreements signed after the end of World War I. In the area inhabited by the Hungarian minority, Czechoslovakia preserved untouched the network of Hungarian municipal or denominational schools. However, these older schools inherited from Austria-Hungary were frequently crowded, under-funded, and less attractive than new, well-equipped Slovak schools built by the state. In the school year 1920–21, the Hungarian minority had 721 elementary schools, which only decreased by one in the next 3 years. Hungarians had also 18 higher "burgher" schools, 4 grammar schools, and 1 teacher institute. In the school year 1926–27, there were 27 denominational schools which can also be classified as minority schools, as none of them taught in Slovak. Hungarian representatives criticized the reduced number of secondary schools.

Due to gerrymandering, the Hungarians had a diminished level of representation in the National Assembly and their influence on the politics of Czechoslovakia remained limited. The same factors also limited the Slovak intelligentsia's political power. On the other hand, Hungarians founded numerous parties including pro-Czechoslovak parties, parties with agrarian, social-democratic, Christian-socialist and other orientations, were active as sections of statewide Czechoslovak parties, had opportunities to participate in government, and in the 1920s Hungarian members of parliament participated in the adoption of several important laws with statewide impact.

=== Slovak-Hungarian inter-state relations during WWII (1939–1945) ===
During the World War II era, Hungary regained Hungarian-populated areas of Slovakia under the First Vienna Award of 1938. These territories were returned to Czechoslovakia when Hungary was defeated at the conclusion of World War II by the Treaty of Paris (with the exception of Carpathian Ruthenia, which was annexed by the Soviet Union).

On March 14, 1939, Slovakia declared independence and Hungary was the first country to recognize it de facto and de jure. At the same time, Budapest, relying on the postulate of the actual breakup of Czechoslovakia, started the occupation of Carpathian Ruthenia, which also declared its independence. Following this military action, pointing to the controversial nature of the Slovak-Carpathian border, Hungarian troops began to engage in Eastern Slovakia. The "small war" between 23 March – 4 April 1939 heightened tensions between Budapest and Bratislava. As a result of the conflict, the Tiso government agreed to cede about 1,000 km^{2} in Eastern Slovakia to Hungary.

Slovakia started to seek protection from Hungarian revisionism through Germany, which promised to guarantee its sovereignty and territorial integrity by signing the Berlin treaty on March 23, 1939. Moreover, Bratislava cherished plans to change the 1938 borders and hoped for the return of a 3,600 km^{2}-area (including Košice) with a population of 350,000 people (of around 200,000 Slovaks and 100,000 Magyars).

In September 1939, Slovakia participated in the German offensive against Poland and benefited from the reattachment of the territories transferred to Poland in 1938. Otherwise, Budapest showed sympathy for Warsaw and refused the passage of Slovak troops towards Poland via Hungarian railroads. Also, around 100,000 Polish refugees (among them 45,000 belonging to the Polish military) found haven in Hungary. Many of them were settled in the former Southern Slovakia, probably in order to reinforce Hungarian order in the frontier regions with Slovakia.

Also, in the first two years the Second World War, Slovakia and Hungary tried to improve their relations with the USSR and to use the Soviet-German conflictive rapprochement (in 1939–1941) in their revisionist interests. While Slovaks hoped to cooperate with the Kremlin on the basis of the Soviet claims to Subcarpathian Ruthenia, Hungarians scheduled a parallel action with the Soviet Red Army against Romania for the return of Transylvania to Hungary and of Bessarabia to the Soviet Union. On the other side, Moscow hesitated to choose between the rapprochement with Slovakia (and Romania) or Hungary until the summer of 1940. Afterwards, when the pro-Russian Slovak leader Ferdinand Durcansky was removed from the post of Slovak Minister of Foreign Affairs in June 1940, the Soviets tried to play the "Hungarian card" and supported Budapest's claims against Bucharest on Transylvania in August 1940. Thus, Hungary was able to motivate Germany to make pressure on Romania to cede Northern Transylvania to Hungary. Following months, Moscow showed other Hungarophile signs: signed a trade treaty with Hungary on 3 September 1940; did not protest against Hungary's accession to the Tripartite Pact in November 1940; in autumn 1941 solemnly sent back to Budapest the Hungarian flags that were captured during the suppression of the Hungarian Revolution of 1848 by the Imperial Russian Army. Nevertheless, the Kremlin was unable to overcome Berlin's influence in Hungary, which played the role of protector against Slovak revisionism and promised new territorial concessions in Yugoslavia in autumn 1941.

Therefore, in 1941 Berlin gradually achieved the reduction of the Soviet sympathies for both Danubian states. The Slovak and Hungarian declaration of war on the Soviet Union in June, and the UK and the US in December 1941 finally cemented the fall of both states under the influence of the Axis. This dependence froze the revisionist hopes in Bratislava and Budapest as Berlin refused to raise the issue of border changes until the end of the war. In autumn 1941 the Slovak–Hungarian relations worsened twice, however, they normalized under German pressure. During the Berlin meeting of Slovak and Hungarian prime-ministers Vojtech Tuka and Laszlo Bardossy on 25–26 November 1941, the two leaders agreed to improve the bilateral relations and to register the previously banned political and cultural organizations of the Slovak and Hungarian minorities.

In 1942 the Slovak–Hungarian relations continued to improve. Protracted war, accompanied by military defeats of the Axis, made adjustments to the diplomacy of the Danubian states. In March 1942, following the request of the Hungarian regent Miklós Horthy, Miklós Kállay formed a government and began secret negotiations with the British and Americans in order to withdraw Hungary from the war. In the spring of 1943 Kallay initiated negotiations with Slovakia, where the central issue was the "anti-German U-turn" and the rapprochement between the two countries. However, Bratislava was primarily interested in the return of Kosice, which was unacceptable for Budapest. Meanwhile, the Hungarians unofficially suggested that the frontiers of 1938 could be revoked if Slovakia were merged with Hungary in a confederation.

Budapest continued to seek a rapprochement with Bratislava and in early 1944 contacted the Slovak military. However, the German occupation of Hungary in March 1944 did not allow a clear agreement between Budapest and Bratislava. Moreover, an attempt to seize power by the Slovak military and to move Slovakia to the side of the anti-Hitler coalition in September–October 1944 ended in failure. During this uprising, the Slovaks established a link with the Hungarian government of Geza Lakatos and helped him to send a Hungarian peace delegation to Moscow. Finally, the defeat of the Slovak national uprising led to the complete occupation of Slovakia by German troops. At the same time, Berlin insisted on the transfer of power in Hungary to a loyal nationalist government of Ferenc Szálasi. Thus, the relationship between Slovakia and Hungary in late 1944 came under the full control of Germany. On the other hand, the anti-Hitler coalition, by reinstating Czechoslovakia, removed from the daily agenda the interstate Slovak–Hungarian relations until 1993.

== Gabčíkovo – Nagymaros Dams ==
The "Budapest Treaty" of 1977, between Hungary and Czechoslovakia, was a plan to tame the Danube and increase its navigability with levees, dams, locks, overflow channels, and designated flood plains, and to generate hydroelectricity. The joint project was intended to cover the entire 150 km stretch of the Danube as it forms the border between Slovakia and Hungary, from the upstream, western, end at Čunovo, Slovakia, to Nagymaros, Hungary, in the east. Construction started when the Soviet Union broke up in 1991, but only on the Slovak side. In 1989, Hungary had suspended its participation and in 1992 backed out of the treaty altogether citing environmental concerns. This caused a still unresolved international dispute between Slovakia and Hungary. Both parties turned to the International Court at The Hague for a ruling.

== 1993–1998 ==
The relations were strained from the very beginning of Slovakia's existence as an independent state in 1993 due to Hungary's refusal to sign the treaty declaring inviolability of the mutual boundaries and also because Hungary declared its intent to interfere into Slovak internal affairs with the objective of Hungarian minority protection, which was perceived as unacceptable in Slovakia.

In 1995 the Slovak language law came into force, which demanded that civil servants speak it and imposed fines on the use of foreign languages on public documents or in broadcasting without a translation into the state language, with some exceptions, like songs in other languages being played on the radio. National minorities were exempt from several of its provisions. The sections about the fines were later deemed unconstitutional by the Slovak constitutional court and henceforth abolished in 1999. In 2009, the Slovak Language Law made the use of the minority language in official communication punishable in towns and villages where the ethnic community now made up less than 20 percent of the total population. All documentation of minority schools should be duplicated in the state language. The law stipulates that the names of streets and buildings anywhere in Slovakia must be stated in Slovak and it also introduces sanctions of up to €5,000 ($7,000) on those who break rules promoting the use of Slovak in public and for municipalities and public offices for not using Slovak "properly."

Since both Slovakia and Hungary were aspiring for EU membership at the time, in 1995 Hungarian prime minister Gyula Horn along with his Slovak counterpart Vladimír Mečiar were pressured into signing a bilateral treaty. This treaty included measures for guaranteeing the minority rights for both countries and also a pledge not to consider the treatment of the Hungarian minority in Slovakia as an internal affair and vice versa. This last provision has been subsequently ignored by Vladimír Mečiar's and Robert Fico's administration as well. Mečiar even suggested a complete population exchange at a bilateral negotiation with Horn in 1997.

== 2000s ==
=== The Malina controversy ===
Hedvig Malina, a Hungarian student from Horné Mýto, Slovakia, made claims of being physically assaulted in a hate crime incident. Malina claims she was severely beaten and robbed on 25 August 2006 in Nitra after speaking Hungarian in public. She claims her attackers wrote "SK [abbreviation for Slovakia] without parasites" (Slovak: SK bez parazitov), and "Hungarians to the other side of the Danube" (Slovak: Maďari za Dunaj) on her clothes. Upon investigation of the incident by Slovak Police, Malina was accused of making misleading statements to the police and has been charged with perjury. In December 2007, Slovak police released a video tape of the initial hearing to Malina's lawyers, who are now claiming irregularities in the way the interview had been conducted. Malina has taken her case to the European Court of Human Rights, challenging what she terms the "inhumane and humiliating" conduct of Slovak officials.

=== Confirmation of the Beneš decrees ===
In the summer of 2007, Party of the Hungarian Coalition has proposed a law that would grant compensation by "moral and financial means" for Hungarians harmed by the Beneš decrees of former Czechoslovakia. This compensation was to consist of a fund that would be available to the Hungarian community is Slovakia by various means. A similar fund exists to compensate the Germans and the Jews for the wrongdoings of 1939–47. Despite the historic record, Slovaks argue Hungarians were never expelled (as were the Germans), nor exterminated in death camps (as were the Jews). All ethnically Slovak members voted to confirm the decrees; Hungarian leaders voted against them. The then Hungarian President László Sólyom said the decision was unacceptable and that it would put a strain on Hungarian-Slovak relations.

=== Slovak riot police beating of Hungarian football fans ===
On 1 November 2008, a football match between DAC Dunajská Streda and Slovan Bratislava was disrupted by Slovak riot police after only 15 minutes injuring more than 60 people, many of whom lost consciousness or suffered injuries including concussion and broken jaws. Local policemen stormed Hungarian nationals, who were at the game to support the home team and to protest the burning of a Hungarian flag at an earlier game. flags with Árpád stripes, favoured by the extreme right in Hungary, were being waved and the home crowd sang the Hungarian national anthem before kickoff.

According to The Budapest Times press report from the scene, police failed to act against Slovan supporters who were throwing smoke bombs, noise grenades and other missiles on the pitch. An official press release indicates that police arrested 31 people. 16 of them were citizens of Hungary (not playing the match), 15 citizens of Slovakia and 13 of them were fans of Slovan. Before the football match, police confiscated various pyrotechnics and potential attack tools. Slovak authorities also prevented incoming of Hungarian rock band Romantikus erőszak (Romantic violence) who had to play the same evening. An organizer of the concert, who organized also journey of Hungarian football fans in this case, did not cross borders as well. Organisation People Against Racism recorded various provocations from DAC fans supported by fans from Hungary, including raising flags with historical maps or chanting "Slovaks, you have no home". On the other hand, they recorded manifestation of extreme nationalism among Slovan fans like symbols of Hlinka Guard. Due to this reason, police arrested two fans from Bratislava.

Based on videos posted on the internet showing the incident from various angles the supporters were not doing anything that would warrant such an intervention by police. Five days after the game the Slovak police presented a photo as evidence, showing one of the supporters raising his fist to throw a punch, but police officers can not be seen on the image. Spontaneous demonstrations were held in Budapest at the embassy and the consulate of Slovakia on the night of the incident. Protesters lit candles to honor the victims and burned a Slovak flag.

=== Claims of Hungarian irredentism in Viktor Orbán speech ===
Hungarian opposition leader (at the time), chairman of Fidesz, Viktor Orbán delivered a campaign speech in Esztergom, Hungary on May 23, 2009, two weeks before the 2009 European elections, in which he wondered how many MEPs will represent the Hungarians from the Carpathian Basin. (Note: Most Hungarian people live scattered across the whole Carpathian Basin and have become separated by state borders due to the Treaty of Trianon of 1920.) (This geographical region, the traditional area of the Kingdom of Hungary, includes areas of Romania, Slovakia, Serbia, Ukraine, Croatia, Slovenia and Austria.) The governing coalition of Slovakia condemned the move.

=== Language laws ===
==== Slovak language law ====
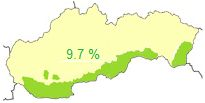
Areas in Slovakia where Hungarian speakers make up at least 20%.

In 2009 the Slovak parliament amended the 1995 language law, mandating preferential use of the state language – Slovak. Use of a non-state language in state institutions (local government, hospital, police) by citizens interacting with it could carry a financial penalty. The law does not interfere with private use of minority languages.

==== Reaction of Hungary ====
Gordon Bajnai, the Hungarian Prime Minister, has accused Slovakia of scapegoating Hungarian speakers. The Government of Hungary turned to the EU institutions to request the law from Slovakia, analyze it according to the requirements of EU treaties and conventions and nullify any points they find contradicting them.

The leaders of the EU stated that national legislation is under the authority of member nation states, and while the EU was founded in order to avert conflicts and solve them, bilateral relations do not have to take place in the European Parliament. Yet according to request the procedure of checking the conformity of the law the EU institutions naturally start.

Some members of the Government of Hungary during interviews expressed their expectation from older members states to make their presence felt not only when their economic expansion can be achieved, but when there are problems, and try to investigate problems and get informed about marginally known territory when that is necessary.

After the EU handed over the list it found in breach with regulation accepted by Slovakia by being a member the Government told the press it will keep its attention on the process of the modifications and will report again if the result after deadline it considers unsatisfactory.

==== Press and international reaction ====
Hungarian foreign minister Péter Balázs compared the creation of the language law to the politics of the Nicolae Ceauşescu regime on the use of language. The dual standards for Czech usage in Slovakia has been questioned with Slovak authorities even considering a ban, however this charge ignores the mutual intelligibility between Czech and Slovak, which render them compatible in business and law.

Opponents have described the law as one that "criminalises the use of Hungarian", According to Organization for Security and Co-operation in Europe High Commissioner on National Minorities Knut Vollebæk the language law complies with international law and Slovakia's international obligations. The Party of the Hungarian Coalition (MKP) asked the Slovak Government to release communication exchanged between them and Vollebæk so that the opinion of Vollebæk regarding the law could not be misrepresented or distorted. According to the Slovak Ministry of Foreign Affairs the report was released unchanged and in full. Spokesman Peter Stano stated: "It is obvious that the Party of the Hungarian Coalition was unable to question the reliability of Vollebæk report, that law is following the legitimate goal and it's in accordance with all international norms." Vollebæk will monitor the situation until the law on minority language use will reach the level of the state language law.

The American Hungarian Federation (AHF) has called attention to what it calls an "unacceptable" law that is "inconsistent with Slovakia's freely assumed obligations, Western values, democratic principles and the international norms to which Slovakia as a member of the OSCE has committed itself."

=== Minorities in Hungary ===
According to Slovak historian Ladislav Deák, during communist rule in Hungary, most of the Slovak minority who did not emigrate were stripped of their Slovak identity. Jenő Kaltenbach, Hungarian ex-ombudsman for national minorities and president of the German Minority Self-Government in Hungary, said that "minorities in Hungary, without exception, are on edge of abyss of their identity", "the national minorities were practically assimilated and action programs for them are just an illusion". He also said that the Hungarian minority language law is "nice to hear, but full of unrealised law norms".

=== Komárno incident ===
In August 2009 the Hungarian president, László Sólyom, planned a visit to the Slovak city of Révkomárom/Komárno to unveil a statue commemorating Saint Stephen of Hungary. The day of the visit, August 21 coincided with the date of the Warsaw Pact invasion of Czechoslovakia, of which Hungary was a participant, and it is one day after the national celebration of the foundation of the Hungarian state (August 20). The Slovak government labelled the timing deliberate provocation, and questioned the president's refusal to meet with Slovak delegates. The Slovak government issued a one-day travel ban in response, and manned the bridge with policemen to prevent rioting. Sólyom did not enter Slovakia. The government of Hungary called the ban "unfounded" and "unacceptable". Hungary plans to lodge a complaint with the EU, however, according to der Standard, the European Commission does not want to concern itself with the case. The Advocate-General in charge of the case at the Court of Justice of the EU supported the legality of the ban.

=== Attack on the Slovak Embassy ===
==== Attack on the embassy itself ====
On August 26, 2009, a few days after the Komárno incident, two Molotov cocktails were thrown at the Slovak embassy in Budapest, causing no casualties as the flammable fluids did not ignite or detonate. Authorities condemned the attack. The foreign ministry of Slovakia stated they view the incident with great concern, but at the same time "it is seen as an isolated criminal offence".

==== Attack on the Slovak ambassador ====
On August 27, 2009, one day following the armed attack on the embassy, a Hungarian driver attempted to run the diplomatic car of Peter Weiss off the road while driving in the Budapest traffic. Though the diplomatic vehicle remained on the road, the driver begun to verbally assault its occupants. The driver and his accomplices were stopped and it is now being investigated whether the outburst was connected to the Embassy attack. The Slovak government did not condemn the attack as a good-will gesture towards Hungary.

=== Political statements by a leading member of the Slovak governing coalition ===
Following the Slovak parliamentary elections of 2006 the far-right Slovak National Party (SNS) became a small part of the governing coalition. Ján Slota, chairman of SNS is known for anti-Hungarian sentiment. Der Spiegel and various international media outlets have reported Slota as saying "The Hungarians are a tumor in the body of the Slovak nation." He also threatened to send tanks to "flatten Budapest" should Slovakia's Hungarian minority, once the ruling class and still about 10 percent of the country's population today, attempt to teach the Slovaks "the Lord's Prayer in Hungarian" once again. Slota also called Hungarians the descendants of "ugly, bow-legged, Mongoloid characters on disgusting horses".

=== Historical revisionism ===
It has been alleged that Deputy PM Robert Fico has been engaging in historical revisionism in the government's update of the national curriculum. Slovak political scientist Miroslav Kusý claims that by adopting such scientifically questionable rhetoric Fico aims to "strengthen national consciousness by the falsification of history". It is not known whether this issue has affected relations between the states.

The Slovak National Party has sidelined a long-planned joint textbook with Hungary and is promoting instead a Slovak-centred view of the country's patchwork past.

== 2010s ==
=== Hungarian nationality law reform and bill of the day of national unity ===
On May 26, 2010, the Fidesz-dominated newly elected Hungarian Parliament voted to give the ethnic Hungarians living in other countries the right to claim Hungarian citizenship without requiring them to live in Hungary. The only requirements are a Hungarian ancestry and a command of Hungarian. The purpose of the government MEPs was reunification of the nation according to their own evaluation of who is in need of being granted simplified process of citizenship. The requirements were eased as address in Hungary was not required anymore.

Slovak political force condemned the move and initiated a law that makes a person lose their Slovak citizenship if they take up another in order to discourage them from doing that. The Slovak Prime Minister Robert Fico called the proposed reforms a threat to national security. In response to the passage of the Hungarian nationality law reform Slovakia altered its own citizenship law, stripping Slovak citizenship from any Slovak citizen who applies for another citizenship (not applicable if naturalisation procedure is initiated by another states' authorities); in effect highly restricting its recognition of dual citizenship. Radical Slovak politician Jan Slota stated that as many Hungarians live on both side of the Danube, the next step by them after getting their citizenship can be the demand of being annexed back to Hungary. For this reason he considered his and others' fears justified, and told the press he obviously doesn't accuse Slovaks living in Australia to have the intention of annexing it to Australia, but with Hungary they believe their fear has rational bases.

On 31 May 2010 the Hungarian Parliament declared June 4, the day on which Hungary signed the Treaty of Trianon in 1920, the day of national unity. The bill was criticized by opposition members, former Prime Minister Ferenc Gyurcsány wrote in his blog 'The law wants to heal the injuries of Trianon but only makes new ones.' The bill was voted by 302 representatives (55 rejected, 12 abstained) and it states that: "Every member and community of the Hungarians, who are forced to live under several foreign authorities, is a part of the unified Hungarian nation, whom unity above all state borders is a reality, moreover it is an important element of the individual and universal self-identity of every Hungarian."

'For Slovakia the Treaty of Trianon bears a historical importance', Slovak President Ivan Gasparovic reacted on the new bill. 'It is a valid document, which was accepted by every signatory's own will. It must be obeyed, its purposes and consequences must not be questioned!' Gasparovic expressed fears that the new Hungarian government and Parliament wants to make a change in foreign policy and wants a revision of the treaty.

The second Orbán administration didn't announce such change which would have been a deviation of the long-term political strategy accepted in the early 1990s, which was the former Orbán administration's strategy also. Hungary has also expressed several times - and suggested it in this very bill – that it does not seek any territorial revision. Seeking it would endanger peace and would most probably end its membership in EU and NATO.

According to an opinion piece by Slovak (Note: born to a Slovak mother and a Czech father in Bratislava, Czechoslovakia) journalist Martin M. Šimečka the law resembles the Russian policy of granting citizenship to the inhabitants of the Georgian region of South Ossetia prior to the war of 2008, in which the Russian forces claimed to be protecting new Russian citizens on the Georgian territory. (Note: both Hungary and Slovakia are European Union and NATO members.)

The Hungarian step triggered tensions between the two countries, and sparked an angry response from Slovakia. Slovakia strongly opposes the plan. Slovakia itself allowed dual citizenship at the time, and allowed a limited right of return for ethnic Slovaks (see Slovak nationality law). Of Hungary's neighbours, only Slovakia has objected to the move. As of December 2011, there are at least four ethnic Hungarians who were stripped of their Slovak citizenship after gaining Hungarian citizenship, and were ordered to hand in their Slovak identity documents at a police station.

=== János Esterházy controversy ===
Hungarian official representatives and Hungarian minority politicians repeatedly organize celebrations of a controversial historical figure János Esterházy where they present him as a Hungarian martyr, model for cohabitation with other nations, humanist, democrat and fighter for modern European values. In Slovakia, Esterházy is known mainly for his activities against mid-war Czechoslovakia coordinated with Nazis and for his ambiguous role in the Holocaust. In an August 23, 2011 statement, President of Slovakia Ivan Gašparovič opposed erecting a sculpture in János Esterházy's memory in Kosice, saying that the one-time deputy had been a follower of Adolf Hitler and fascism. He also opposed Ferdinand Ďurčanský's sculpture in that case. The president said the Hungarian ethnic politician and "martyr" was a supporter of Nazism.

Hungary's Foreign Ministry the next day rejected Slovak President Ivan Gasparovic's statement and said that the ideology reflected in the statement did not contribute to the development of bilateral relations. The ministry "notes with regret and incomprehension" that issues surrounding the martyred count are in the focus of daily Slovak politics, the ministry said. The achievements of Esterházy are recognised in many countries including Israel, the statement noted. Marek Trubac, the Slovak president's spokesman, told MTI that Esterházy is considered a war criminal in Slovakia, "for supporting fascist ideology". Though Esterházy did vote against the anti-Jewish bills, he also welcomed (former Hungarian regent) Miklós Horthy's "fascist troops" that occupied Kosice, the spokesman added.

Hungarian Deputy Prime Minister Zsolt Semjén said he was appalled by Gasparovic's statement. He said that Esterházy "heroically exercised the virtues" and was all along committed to the teachings of the Catholic Church, so it is not by chance that his beatification is under way.

Hungarian President Pál Schmitt said "it is unacceptable that János Esterházy, this true democrat and humanist, still qualifies as a war criminal in Slovakia".

== 2020s ==
=== Fico-Orbán alliance ===
A significant reversal occurred by 2022, marking a warming trend as Fico publicly welcomed Orbán's re-election and praised his nationalistic approach. Similarly, Hungarian foreign minister Péter Szijjártó welcomed Fico's return to office in 2023, commenting: "Robert Fico has the same views on the war, migration and gender issues as us".

Since Fico's return to office in 2023, the two countries have forged a strong strategic and ideological partnership, characterized by shared opposition to the European Union's stance on migration and military aid to Ukraine. This close alignment has positioned Slovakia as a key ally for Hungary in Brussels, with Fico publicly stating that the "sovereign positions of Hungary and Slovakia would be suitable for a significant strengthening of cooperation within the Visegrad Four".

During the 2026 Slovak–Ukraine oil dispute, Hungary and Slovakia worked together in actions against Ukraine.

=== Beneš decree controversy and election of Péter Magyar ===
In 2026, the Slovakian government, led by Robert Fico, passed a law criminalizing the act of questioning the Beneš decrees, World War II-era laws which assigned collective responsibility to ethnic Hungarians and Germans in Slovakia for the war and providing for the confiscation of Hungarian land. The Slovakian government denied plans to begin land confiscations again. Hungarian prime minister Viktor Orbán, an ideological ally of Fico, did not strongly protest the passage of the new law, although he did signal that he disagreed with it.

Hungary held parliamentary elections on 12 April. Viktor Orbán's Fidesz was decisively defeated by the main opposition party, Péter Magyar's Tisza. Magyar harshly criticized the implementation of the new law on the Beneš decrees and promised to support the Hungarian minority in Slovakia more strongly than Orbán had. Fico and Magyar both criticized each other during the Hungarian election campaign, with Fico calling Magyar a "Brussels politician" and Magyar criticizing Fico for the law on the Beneš decrees and Fico's closeness with Orbán. After the campaign, the two politicians spoke more diplomatically about each other, but tensions about the Beneš decrees continued.

== European Union and NATO ==
Both countries joined the EU on 1 May 2004. Hungary joined NATO on 12 March 1999, and Slovakia on 29 March 2004.

== Resident diplomatic missions ==
- Hungary has an embassy in Bratislava and a consulate-general in Košice and a vice–consulate in Banská Bystrica.
- Slovakia has an embassy in Budapest and a consulate-general in Békéscsaba.

== See also ==
- Foreign relations of Hungary
- Foreign relations of Slovakia
- Visegrád Group
- Hungarians in Slovakia
- Slovaks in Hungary
- Ethnic minorities in Czechoslovakia
- Czechoslovakia–Hungary relations
- Magyarization
- Slovakization
