= Péter Balázs =

Hungarian politician (born 1941)

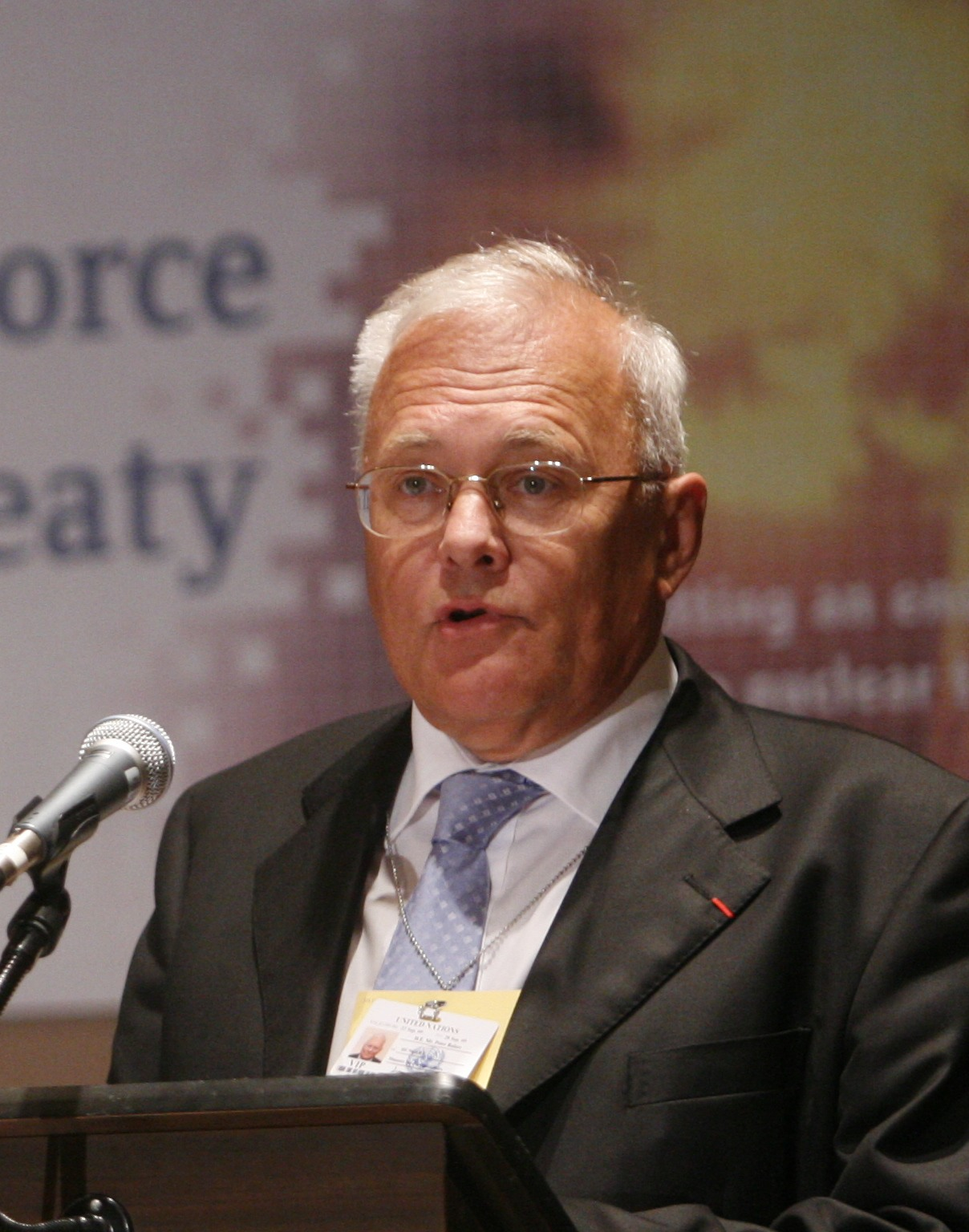
- Balázs in 2009

Minister of Foreign Affairs
- In office 16 April 2009 – 29 May 2010
- Prime Minister: Gordon Bajnai
- Preceded by: Kinga Göncz
- Succeeded by: János Martonyi

European Commissioner for Regional Policy
- In office 1 May 2004 – 21 November 2004
- President: Romano Prodi
- Preceded by: Monika Wulf-Mathies
- Succeeded by: Danuta Hübner

Personal details
- Born: 5 December 1941 (age 84) Kecskemét, Kingdom of Hungary
- Party: Independent
- Children: 5 daughters 1 son
- Profession: Diplomat, economist, politician

Péter Balázs (Hungarian pronunciation: [ˈpeːtɛr ˈbɒlaːʒ], born 5 December 1941) is a Hungarian politician who served as Minister of Foreign Affairs from 2009 to 2010.

In addition to his native Hungarian, he speaks English, French, German and Russian.

He graduated from Budapest School of Economics in 1963 and worked in the Hungarian government until 1 May 2004, when his country joined the European Union and was appointed to the European Commission with Michel Barnier under Romano Prodi.

He became the Hungarian European Commissioner holding the Regional Policy portfolio until the end of the Prodi Commission on 21 November 2004. He was succeeded by László Kovács as the Hungarian Commissioner and Danuta Hübner as Commissioner for regional policy.

Balázs became a professor at the International Relations and European Studies Department of the Central European University (CEU), Budapest. In 2005, he established a new research center for EU Enlargement Studies at the CEU.

Balázs became the Hungarian Minister of Foreign Affairs in April 2009, serving until May 2010. Balázs, when addressing the topic of Hungary-Slovakia relations compared the creation of the language law of Slovakia to the politics of the Ceauşescu regime on the use of language. He was succeeded by János Martonyi.

Balázs is a member of the advisory board of the Prague European Summit.

Political offices
Preceded by Monika Wulf-Mathies	European Commissioner for Regional Policy; May 2004 – Nov 2004	Succeeded by Danuta Hübner
Preceded by new post	Hungarian European Commissioner; May 2004 – Nov 2004	Succeeded by László Kovács
Preceded by Kinga Göncz	Minister of Foreign Affairs; 2009–2010	Succeeded by János Martonyi
