= János Németh (jurist) =

Hungarian jurist (1933–2021)

2nd President of the Constitutional Court of Hungary
- In office 25 November 1998 – 31 July 2003
- Preceded by: László Sólyom
- Succeeded by: András Holló

Personal details
- Born: 31 July 1933 Újpest, Kingdom of Hungary
- Died: 1 March 2021 (aged 87)

János Németh (31 July 1933 – 1 March 2021) was a Hungarian jurist, lawyer, and professor. He was President of the Faculty of Law of the Eötvös Loránd University for several decades. He was chairman of the National Election Office from 1990 to 1997 and was President of the Constitutional Court of Hungary from 1998 to 2003.

== Biography ==
Németh graduated from Stephen I of Hungary High School in 1951 and attended the Faculty of Law of the Eötvös Loránd University, where he graduated summa cum laude in 1956. He worked briefly as a lawyer before he was hired by Eötvös Loránd University, where he was affiliated until 2003, when he became a professor emeritus. He was deputy general rector of the university from 1993 to 1997. From 2004 to 2007, he served on the General Assembly of the Hungarian Academy of Sciences. He also served as an arbitrator on the Hungarian Chamber of Commerce and Industry until 1997.

In 1990, Németh was elected chairman of the National Election Office in 1990, a position he held until 1997. During this period, the Office resolved many issues regarding the Hungarian election process. In 1997, the Hungarian National Assembly elected him President of the Constitutional Court of Hungary in a multipartisan vote. He was forced to resign in 2003 due to the fact that he had reached the age of 70. In 2003, he was awarded the Grand Cross of the Hungarian Order of Merit.

János Németh died on 1 March 2021 at the age of 87.

== Publications ==
- A rendkívüli perorvoslatok a magyar polgári jogban
- Polgári jog – Családjog – Polgári eljárásjog
- Polgári eljárásjog
- A polgári perrendtartás magyarázata
- Polgári perjog I–II.
- Polgári nemperes eljárások
