= Vergonha =

Linguistic discrimination in France

In Occitan, vergonha (pronounced [beɾˈɣuɲɔ, beʀˈɡuɲɔ, veʀˈɡuɲɔ], lit. 'shame') refers to the effects of various language discriminatory policies of the government of France on its minority or regional languages (including Romance languages such as Occitan and Catalan, as well as non-Romance languages such as Alsatian and Basque) deemed patois, as opposed to standard French. Vergonha is imagined as a process of "being made to reject and feel ashamed of one's (or one's parents') mother tongue through official exclusion, humiliation at school and rejection from the media", as organized and sanctioned by French political leaders from Henri Grégoire onward.

Vergonha is still a controversial topic in modern French public discourse, where some successive French governments have denied discrimination ever existed or downplayed its effects; all the same, it is a commonly cited example of sanctioned systematic linguicide and cultural genocide. In 1860, before French schooling was made compulsory, native Occitan speakers represented more than 39% of the whole French population, as opposed to 52% for francophones proper; their share of the population declined to 26–36% by the late 1920s. Since the end of World War II, it experienced another sharp decline, to less than 7% by 1993.

France has also continuously refused to ratify the European Charter for Regional or Minority Languages, and native non-French languages in France continue to be denied official recognition, with Occitans, Basques, Corsicans, Catalans, Flemings, Bretons, Alsatians, Savoyards and other langues d'oïl speakers still having no explicit legal right to conduct public affairs in their regional languages within their home lands.

== Overview ==
=== 16th to 18th century ===
Beginning in 1539 with Art. 111 of the Ordinance of Villers-Cotterêts, non-French languages in France were reduced in stature when it became compulsory "to deliver and execute all [legal] acts in the French language" (de prononcer et expedier tous actes en langaige françoys). Originally meant as a way to eliminate Latin in official documents—few 16th-century French subjects were educated and familiar with Latin—it also stated that French and only French was legal in the kingdom (en langage maternel françoys et non aultrement).

=== Late 18th to late 19th century ===
==== Abbé Grégoire's "Report on the necessity and means to annihilate the patois" ====
The deliberate process of eradicating non-French vernaculars in modern France and disparaging them as mere local and often strictly oral dialects was formalized with Henri Grégoire's Report on the necessity and means to annihilate the patois and to universalise the use of the French language, which he presented on 4 June 1794 to the National Convention; thereafter, all languages other than French were officially banned in the administration and schools for the sake of linguistically uniting post-Bastille Day France. At the time, only one tenth of the population were fluent in French. In reference to "patois", Jean Jaurès famously claimed that "one names patois the language of a defeated nation". According to the Chambers Dictionary, the origin of the term is disputed but could be a "corruption of patrois, from LL patriensis, a local inhabitant".

Four months earlier (27 January), Bertrand Barère, although an Occitan from Tarbes himself, claimed before this same Convention:

The monarchy had reasons to resemble the Tower of Babel; in democracy, leaving the citizens to ignore the national language [that of Paris], unable to control the power, is betraying the motherland... For a free people, the tongue must be one and the same for everyone. [...] How much money have we not spent already for the translation of the laws of the first two national assemblies in the various dialects of France! As if it were our duty to maintain those barbaric jargons and those coarse lingos that can only serve fanatics and counter-revolutionaries now!

==== The end of traditional provinces ====
This policy can be noted by the way France's internal borders were redrawn, creating 83 départements. The law was passed on 22 December 1789 and took effect the following year, on 4 March 1790. As a result, the centuries-old singularities of the various Occitan-speaking parts were overlooked and shaken in a deliberate effort by the newly formed government to weaken and parcel out long-established feudal domains so that republican France would subdue traditional allegiances, as Antonin Perbòsc reveals in the foreword to his Anthologie:

When the Constituante (National Constituent Assembly) created the départements, their goal was clearly to erase the old geographical and historical distinction of the provinces; however this goal was not as perfectly met as some would have liked: in general, the départements were made up of pieces of existing provinces, quite seldom of the reunion of parts from different provinces. If one could criticize this territorial division for being too arbitrary and too geometric, what can be said of Tarn-et-Garonne, born of a sénatus-consule (a law by the Senate of France) on 2 November 1808? Of course, one may think that the Centralisateur (Napoleon Bonaparte) felt real pleasure showing he could do even better than the centralisateurs of the National Constituent Assembly. With fragments of Quercy, Rouergue, Agenais, Lomagne, Gascony and Languedoc, creating a new unit so little vast and yet so diverse of soil, language and race, what a great idea! And maybe the audacious half-god had only one regret: coming a little too late to redesign according to this pattern all the provinces of old France...

In the 20th century, the départements were grouped into régions, to create a level of government between the departmental and national. While the régions were intended to replace the old provinces, they were not necessarily formed along the same boundaries. As the map shows, there were eleven Occitan-speaking enclaves in the pre-1789 state, such as the powerful lands of Languedoc and Gascony, but they were divided into seven régions with no regard whatsoever for cultural and linguistic identities. This is how Provence-Alpes-Côte d'Azur was created out of portions of five Occitan provinces and three capitals were scrapped in favour of Marseille; and Auvergne came to comprise both native and langues d'oïl entities. Meanwhile, the city of Nantes was administratively removed from Brittany, of which it had been one of two traditional capitals (along with Rennes), and the city of Toulouse was not included in the région of Languedoc-Roussillon, though it had historically been located in that province.

Many of the régions contain hyphenated names, reflecting the merging of multiple historically distinct areas. This is true for four of the seven régions of Occitania: Languedoc-Roussillon, Midi-Pyrénées, Provence-Alpes-Côte d'Azur and Rhône-Alpes.

Traditional Occitan provinces: 1. Béarn (Pau) – 6,800 km^{2} (est.); 2. Guyenne & Gascony (Bordeaux) – 69,400 km^{2} (est.); 3. Limousin (Limoges) – 9,700 km^{2} (est.); 4. County of La Marche (Guéret) – 7,600 km^{2} (est.); 5. Auvergne (Riom) – 19,300 km^{2} (est.); 6. Languedoc (Toulouse) – 45,300 km^{2} (est.); 7. Dauphiné (Grenoble) – 8,500 km^{2} (est.); 8. County of Nice – 3,600 km^{2} (est.); 9. Provence (Aix-en-Provence) – 22,700 km^{2} (est.); 10. Comtat Venaissin (Carpentras) – 3,600 km^{2} (est.); 11. County of Foix (Foix) – 3,300 km^{2} (est.); Régions of France: A. Aquitaine (Bordeaux) – 41,308 km^{2} B. Limousin (Limoges) – 16,942 km^{2} C. Auvergne (Clermont-Ferrand) – 26,013 km^{2} D. Rhône-Alpes (Lyon) – 43,698 km^{2} E. Provence-Alpes-Côte d'Azur (Marseille) – 31,400 km^{2} F. Languedoc-Roussillon (Montpellier) – 27,376 km^{2} G. Midi-Pyrénées (Toulouse) – 45,348 km^{2} – - -: Occitan / Franco-Provençal linguistic limit

- Toulouse lost 76% of its territory of Languedoc
- Bordeaux lost a little more than half its territory of Gascony and Guyenne
- Limoges increased its administrative area by 43%
- Guéret, Pau, Foix, Riom, Aix-en-Provence, Grenoble, Carpentras (1791) and Nice (1860) lost their status as capitals
- Clermont-Ferrand, Montpellier and Marseille became capitals of Auvergne, Languedoc-Roussillon and Provence-Alpes-Côte d'Azur, respectively
- Languedoc was divided into five unequal parts, the largest of which forming Languedoc-Roussillon with the Catalan-speaking province of Roussillon
- The County of Marche, Béarn, the County of Foix and subsequently Comtat Venaissin and the County of Nice lost their autonomy
- Provence-Alpes-Côte d'Azur is made up of Provence and the County of Nice and bits and pieces of three other provinces
- The north of Languedoc and Comtat Venaissin and the western half of Dauphiné became linguistic minorities in the new Rhône-Alpes region
- The Occitan provinces spread over a little less than 200,000 km^{2}
- Gascony and Guyenne, Languedoc, Provence and Auvergne accounted for 78.4% of Occitania in terms of land area, with Gascony and Guyenne making up for over a third of the total surface and Languedoc almost a quarter

=== Late 19th century – Policies and legacy of Jules Ferry ===
==== School discipline ====
In the 1880s, Jules Ferry implemented a series of strict measures to further weaken regional languages in France, as shown in Bernard Poignant's 1998 report to Lionel Jospin. These included children being given punishments by their teachers for speaking Occitan in a Toulouse school or Breton in Brittany. Art. 30 of Loi d'éducation française (French Teaching Law, 1851) stated that: "It is strictly forbidden to speak patois during classes or breaks."

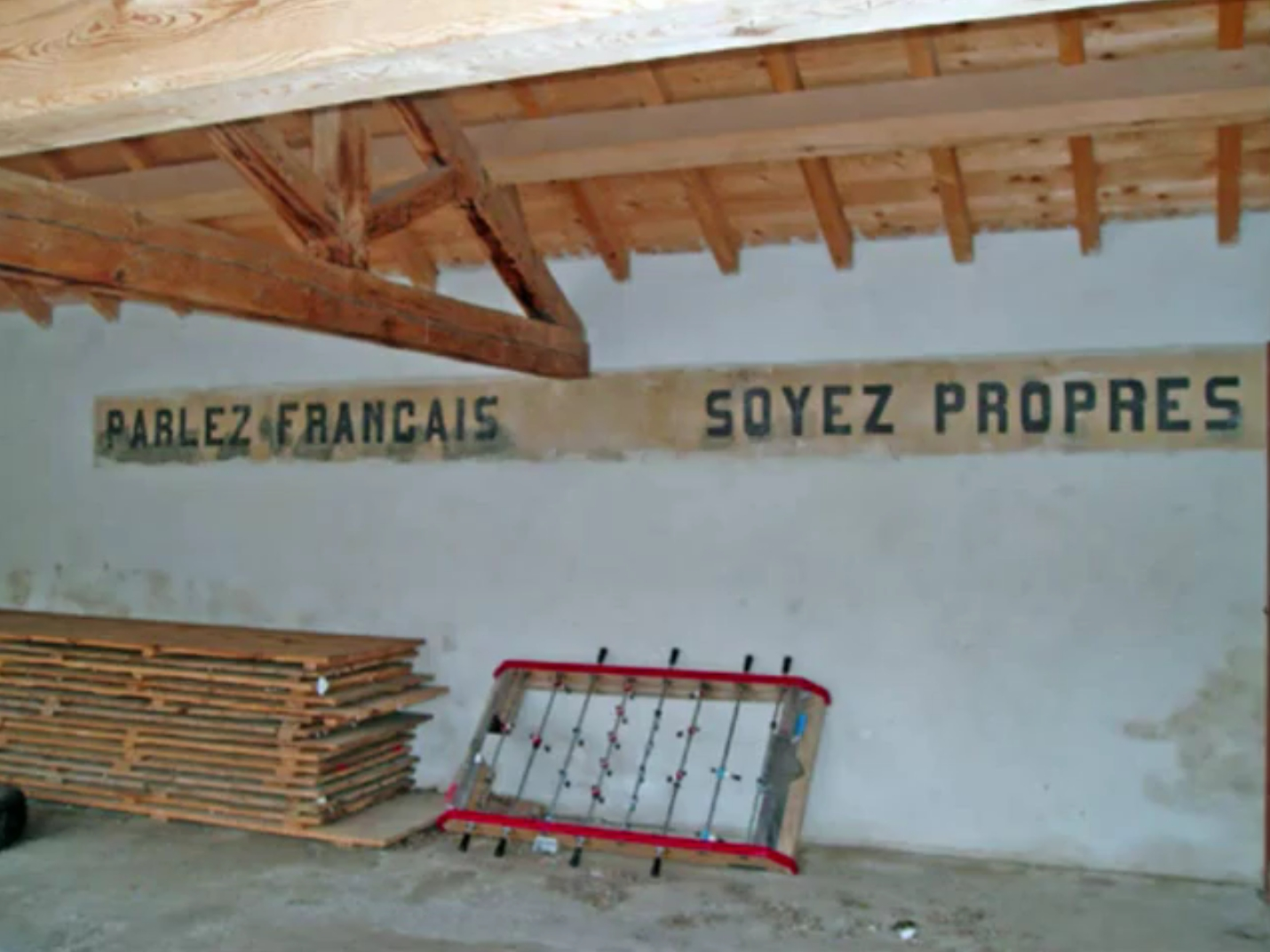
"Speak French, Be Clean" written on the wall of the Ayguatébia-Talau school

Among other well-known examples of humiliation and corporal punishment was clogging, namely hanging a clog (sabot) around their necks as one Breton woman recalled that her grandparents and their contemporaries were forced to endure:

My grandparents speak Breton too, though not with me. As children, they used to have their fingers smacked if they happened to say a word in Breton. Back then, the French of the Republic, one and indivisible, was to be heard in all schools and those who dared challenge this policy were humiliated with having to wear a clog around their necks or kneel down on a ruler under a sign that read: "It is forbidden to spit on the ground and speak Breton". That's the reason why some older folks won't transmit the language to their children: it brings trouble upon yourself...

This practice was referred to as le symbole by officials and la vache (the cow) by pupils, with offenders becoming "vachards". Many objects were used, not just clogs: horseshoes, shingles, slates, wooden plates with a message, coins with a cross on them. The following are official instructions from a Finistère sub-prefect to teachers in 1845: "And remember, Gents: you were given your position in order to kill the Breton language." The prefect of Basses-Pyrénées in the French Basque Country wrote in 1846: "Our schools in the Basque Country are particularly meant to replace the Basque language with French..."

Resorting to the practice of clogging is confirmed by the Autonomes de Solidarité Laïques website:

School has had a unifying role inasmuch as speaking the "noble" language [French] reduced the use of regional dialects and patois. Let us mention the humiliation of children made to wear a clog around their necks for inadvertently speaking a word in the language of the people.

As for signs, they were also found in Poitou schools:

It seems as though Jules Ferry making school free and compulsory in 1881 materialized the work started four centuries earlier [with the Ordinance of Villers-Cotterêts]; the method of repression and humiliation that was undertaken bore fruit with, for instance, the famous signs in school reading: "It is forbidden to spit on the ground and speak patois."

The Conselh de Representacion Generala de la Joventut d'Òc (CRGJOC, General Representation Council of the Occitan Youth), through the Youth of European Nationalities website, reports that

Our language [Occitan] lost its name, becoming some "patois", first at school and then in families through putting pressure on women in education ("Interdit de cracher par terre et de parler patois") with the French Third Republic, Mussolini and Franco.

The Confolentés Occitan (Occitan-speaking Limousin) website testifies to the methods used by French authorities over the past century or so:

To help efface traditional regional identities, the Occitan language was not merely discouraged but actively suppressed. School pupils were punished well within living memory for speaking their native language on school premises.

The French administration managed to make the Occitan speakers think of their own language as a patois, i.e. as a corrupted form of French used only by the ignorant and uneducated. This alienating process is known as la vergonha ("the shame").

Many older speakers of Occitan still believe that their native language is no more than a shameful patois. This is one reason why you rarely hear it in public—or anywhere outside of the neighbourhood or family circle.

Of the school of Camélas in Northern Catalonia, a former pupil recalled in a 1973 interview,

Everyone but the teacher's children spoke Catalan among themselves. We'd even get punished for that, because at the time, we all had to speak French. Be Clean, Speak French could be found written on the school's walls. And if you refused to speak French, they'd give you some sort of wooden sign to wear until death came, as we said, which meant the last offender, in the evening, had twenty lines to copy. We'd speak French in the schoolyard, and for the first ten metres of the way back home, for as long as we thought the teacher would overhear us, and then we'd switch back to our own mother tongue, Catalan.

In those times, Catalan speakers were rather despised. My generation associated speaking Catalan with a disadvantage, with being less than the others, with running the risk of being left behind on the social ladder, in short with bringing trouble.

Abbé Grégoire's own terms were kept to designate the languages of France: while Breton referred to the language spoken in Brittany, the word patois encompassed all Romance dialects such as Occitan and Franco-Provençal. In his report, Corsican and Alsatian were dismissed as "highly degenerate" (très-dégénérés) forms of Italian and German, respectively. As a result, some people still call their non-French language patois, encouraged by the fact they were never taught how to write it and made to think only French exists in the written form.

==== Pressure on the church ====
In 1902, in a speech before the Conseil Général of Morbihan, Chief Education Officer Dantzer recommended that "the Church give first communion only to French-speaking children".

In the same year, prime minister Émile Combes, himself an Occitan, told the prefects of Morbihan, Côtes-du-Nord and Finistère that:

Breton priests want to keep their flock in ignorance by refusing to promote education and using only the Breton language in religious teachings and catechism. The Bretons will only be part of the Republic the day they start speaking French.

=== Mid-20th century to the present ===
As the doctor in Catalan philology and professor at the University of the Balearic Islands Jaume Corbera i Pou argues,

When at the mid-19th century, primary school is made compulsory all across the State, it is also made clear that only French will be taught, and the teachers will severely punish any pupil speaking in patois. The aim of the French educational system will consequently not be to dignify the pupils' natural humanity, developing their culture and teaching them to write their language, but rather to humiliate them and morally degrade them for the simple fact of being what tradition and their nature made them. The self-proclaimed country of the "human rights" will then ignore one of man's most fundamental rights, the right to be himself and speak the language of his nation. And with that attitude France, the "grande France" that calls itself the champion of liberty, will pass the 20th century, indifferent to the timid protest movements of the various linguistic communities it submitted and the literary prestige they may have given birth to.

[...]

France, that under Franco's reign was seen here [in Catalonia] as the safe haven of freedom, has the miserable honour of being the [only] State of Europe—and probably the world—that succeeded best in the diabolical task of destroying its own ethnic and linguistic patrimony and moreover, of destroying human family bonds: many parents and children, or grandparents and grandchildren, have different languages, and the latter feel ashamed of the first because they speak a despicable patois, and no element of the grandparents' culture has been transmitted to the younger generation, as if they were born out of a completely new world. This is the French State that has just entered the 21st century, a country where stone monuments and natural landscapes are preserved and respected, but where many centuries of popular creation expressed in different tongues are on the brink of extinction. The "gloire" and the "grandeur" built on a genocide. No liberty, no equality, no fraternity: just cultural extermination, this is the real motto of the French Republic.

==== Constitutional issues ====
In 1972, Georges Pompidou, the President of France and a native of an Occitan-speaking region, declared that "there is no room for regional languages in a France whose fate is to mark Europe with its seal".

In a pre-election speech in Lorient, on 14 March 1981, François Mitterrand asserted that:

The time has come to give the languages and cultures of France an official status. The time has come to open school doors wide for them, to create regional radio and TV stations to let them be broadcast, to ensure they play all the role they deserve in public life.

These declarations however were not followed by any effective measures.

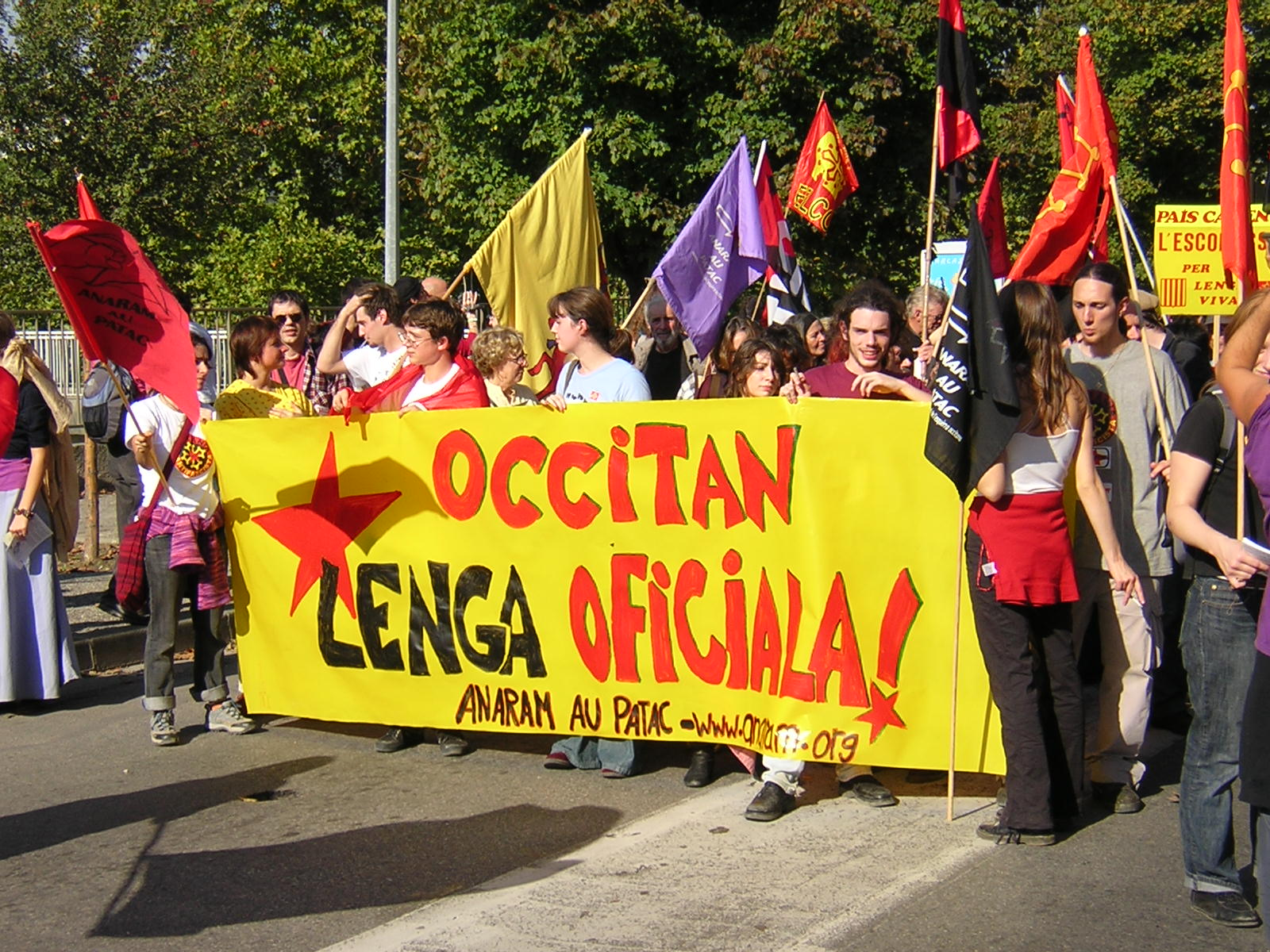
Pro-officiality gathering in Carcassonne

In 1992, after some questioned the unconstitutional segregation of minority languages in France, Art. II of the 1958 French Constitution was revised so that "the language of the Republic is French" (la langue de la République est le français). This was achieved only months before the Council of Europe passed the European Charter for Regional or Minority Languages, which Jacques Chirac ignored despite Lionel Jospin's plea for the Constitutional Council to amend Art. II and include all vernacular languages spoken on French soil. Yet again, non-French languages in France were denied official recognition and deemed too dangerous for the unity of the country, and Occitans, Basques, Corsicans, Catalans, Flemings, Bretons, Alsatians, Nissarts, and Savoyards have still no explicit legal right to conduct public affairs in their regional languages within their home lands. The text was again refused by majority deputies on 18 January 2008, after the Académie française voiced their absolute disapproval of regional languages, the recognition of which they perceive as "an attack on French national identity".

On the UMP website, Nicolas Sarkozy denies any mistreatment of regional languages. In a pre-electoral speech in Besançon on 13 March 2007 he claimed:

If I'm elected, I won't be in favour of the European Charter for Regional Languages. I don't want a judge with a historical experience of the issue of minorities different from ours deciding tomorrow that a regional language must be considered as a language of the Republic just like French.
Because, beyond the text itself, there is a dynamic of interpretations and jurisprudence that can go very far. I am convinced that in France, the land of freedom, no minority is discriminated against and consequently it is not necessary to grant European judges the right to give their opinion on a matter that is consubstantial with our national identity and has absolutely nothing to do with the construction of Europe.

His Socialist rival, Ségolène Royal, on the contrary, declared herself ready to sign the Charter in a March 2007 speech in Iparralde for the sake of cultural variety in France:

Regional identities represent a tremendous asset for the future and I believe that understanding the link between the fundamental values that make the deep-rooted identity between France and the French nation in its diversity, in its authenticity, in its authentic traditions [...] makes the State work well.

On 27 October 2015, the Senate rejected a bill for the ratification of the European Charter for Regional or Minority Languages, preventing the adoption of a constitutional reform that would have given a degree of official status to regional languages such as Occitan. On 8 April 2021, the Breton MP Paul Molac tried to pass a law to protect minority languages, and this law was passed by the French Parliament in Paris. However, the French Minister of Education, opposed to the teaching in minority languages, asked the Conseil Constitutionnel to declare it unconstitutional. This led to the law being constitutionally struck down on 21 May 2021.

The use of regional languages in local governments is still severely contested. In 2022, some local councils in the traditionally Catalan-speaking department of the Pyrénées-Orientales, such as Elne, passed a modification of their statutes to allow the intervention in Catalan language by their elected members, as long as they provide an exact oral translation in French, as well a written French translation of the session. Despite being considered a symbolic gesture, the prefect of the department, arguing that the political rights of French speakers will be violated, appealed to justice to repeal these initiatives. In April 2023, the Administrative Court of Montpellier sided with the Prefect, thus declaring illegal the decisions of the local councils.

== See also ==
- Francization of Brussels
- Minority language
- Minoritized languages
- Prestige language
- Regional language
- Separatism

=== French language policy ===
- Language policy in France
- Languages of France
- Jules Ferry

=== Similar policies in other countries ===
- Dialect card, suppression of Ryukyuan languages and dialects of the Tōhoku region in Japan
- Dog tag, suppression of Taiwanese Hokkien, Hakka and other non-Mandarin Chinese languages in Taiwan
- Suppression of Spanish languages other than Castilian, during Francoist Spain
- Welsh Not, for the suppression of the Welsh language.
- Persecution of minority languages in the Turkish Republic
- Thaification in Thailand that promotes forced assimilation of Siam multiculturalism with Central Thailand dominance
- Law on Promoting Ethnic Unity and Progress passed in China that promotes assimilation among ethnic minorities
