= Education (Scotland) Act 1872 =

Act of the Parliament of the United Kingdom

Education (Scotland) Act 1872 (Note: Section 80.)
- Act of Parliament
- Parliament of the United Kingdom
- Long title: An Act to amend and extend the provisions of the Law of Scotland on the subject of Education.
- Citation: 35 & 36 Vict. c. 62
- Territorial extent: Scotland (Note: Preamble.)

Dates
- Royal assent: 6 August 1872
- Commencement: 6 August 1872 (Note: The Acts of Parliament (Commencement) Act 1793.)
- Repealed: 1 January 1947
Other legislation
Amends	Highland Schools Act 1838
Repeals/revokes	Education Act 1696; Parochial Schools (Scotland) Act 1803; Parochial and Burgh Schoolmasters (Scotland) Act 1861
Repealed by	Statute Law Revision Act 1883; Statute Law Revision Act 1893; Education (Scotland) Act 1901; Education (Scotland) Act 1908; Children Act 1908; Education (Scotland) Act 1918; Reorganisation of Offices (Scotland) Act 1939; Education (Scotland) Act 1945; Education (Scotland) Act 1946
Relates to	Elementary Education Act 1870

Status: Repealed

Text of statute as originally enacted

The Education (Scotland) Act 1872 (35 & 36 Vict. c. 62) was an act of the Parliament of the United Kingdom that made elementary education for all children between the ages of 5 and 13 mandatory in Scotland.

The act achieved a more thorough transfer of existing schools to a public system than the Elementary Education Act 1870 (33 & 34 Vict. c. 75) in England. It created popularly elected school boards which undertook a significant building programme. The act remains controversial because it caused substantial harm to the Scottish Gaelic language. At the time it was criticised because it did not deal with secondary education and because it did too little to safeguard the tradition of the parish schools in Scotland.

== Background ==
In 1864 the government established the Argyll Commission, under Whig grandee George Campbell, 8th Duke of Argyll, to look into the schooling system. It found that of 500,000 children in need of education 200,000 were receiving it under efficient conditions, 200,000 in schools of doubtful merit, without any inspection and 90,000 were receiving no education at all. Although this compared favourably with the situation in England, with 14% more children in education and with relatively low illiteracy rates of between 10 and 20%, similar to those in the best-educated nations such as those in Germany, the Netherlands, Switzerland and Scandinavia, the report was used as support for widespread reform. The result was the 1872 Education (Scotland) Act, based on that passed for England and Wales as the Elementary Education Act 1870 (33 & 34 Vict. c. 75), but providing a more comprehensive solution.

== Provisions ==
Under the act approximately 1,000 regional school boards were established and, unlike in England where they merely attempted to fill gaps in provision, immediately took over the schools of the old and new kirks and were able to begin to enforce attendance, rather than after the decade necessary in England. Some ragged and industrial schools requested to be taken over by the boards, while others continued as Sunday schools. All children aged from 5 to 13 years were to attend. Poverty was not accepted as an excuse and some help was supplied under the Poor laws. This was enforced by the School Attendance Committee, while the boards busied themselves with building to fill the gaps in provision. This resulted in a major programme that created large numbers of grand, purpose-built schools. Overall administration was placed, by the act, in the hands of the Board of Education for Scotland, to be based in Edinburgh, and reporting to the Scotch (later Scottish) Education Department in London. Demand for places was high and for a generation after the act there was overcrowding in many classrooms, with up to 70 children being taught in one room. The emphasis on a set number of passes at exams also led to much learning by rote and the system of inspection led to even the weakest children being drilled with certain facts.

== Effect on Gaelic ==
The act did not specify any medium of instruction, leaving instruction, standards, taught subjects, the accreditation, inspection, along with the hiring and dismissal of teachers, to the new Board of Education for Scotland, in combination with the new locally elected Education boards; these boards also being granted the power to regulate existing schools in their districts. The new locally elected boards effectively put an end to non-English medium education and repressed Scottish Gaelic medium education, with pupils being punished for speaking the language. Pupils were physically punished if caught speaking in Gaelic and beaten again if they did not reveal the names of other students speaking Gaelic. The effect of the education act upon the Gaelic language has been described as "disastrous" and by denying the value of Gaelic culture and language, contributed to destroying the self-respect of Gaelic communities. It was a continuation of a general policy (by both Scottish and, after 1707, British governments) which aimed at Anglicisation.

As a result of facing punishment and humiliation for speaking Gaelic, many parents decided not to pass on the language to their children, resulting in language shift. Scottish Gaelic medium education was not established until the 1980s, and the impact of the Act is still being felt in Gaelic communities today.

== Subsequent developments ==
The whole act, so far as unrepealed, was repealed by section 144(4) of, and the eighth schedule to, the Education (Scotland) Act 1946 (9 & 10 Geo. 6. c. 72).

== See also ==
- Canadian Gaelic § Reasons for decline
- Specific devices for punishing children using the "wrong" language in schools:
  - Welsh Not
  - Symbole in France
  - Dialect card (方言札, hōgen fuda) in Japan
