= List of deputies elected in the first round of the 2017 French legislative election =

In the electoral system for the French National Assembly, there is a first round. If a candidate obtains more than 50% of the vote and more than 25% of the total enrolment for the constituency, they are elected. Otherwise, a second round election is held, only first-round candidates with the support of at least 12.5% of eligible voters are allowed to participate, but if only 1 candidate meets that standard the two candidates with the highest number of votes in the first round may continue to the second round. In the second round, the candidate with a plurality is elected.

These are the deputies elected in the first round in 2017.

Deputy	Constituency	Notes
Napole Polutele	Wallis and Futuna	Polutele's election was later invalidated by the constitutional court, a by-election was held, which was won in the first round by Sylvain Brial.
Paul Molac	Morbihan's 4th constituency	Source: Ministry of the Interior
Sylvain Maillard	Paris's 1st constituency	Source: Ministry of the Interior
Stéphane Demilly	Somme's 5th constituency	Source: Ministry of the Interior

Aveyron's 2nd constituency had a second round election, but with only one candidate. No candidate exceeded 50% of the vote in the first round and a second round with André At and Anne Blanc was called. André At then withdrew from the election before the second round was held. Blanc was elected with all of the votes at the second round.

== See also ==
- List of deputies elected in the first round of the 2022 French legislative election
