= List of deputies elected in the first round of the 2022 French legislative election =

In the electoral system for the French National Assembly, there is a first round. If a candidate obtains more than 50% of the vote and more than 25% of the total enrolment for the constituency, they are elected. Otherwise, a second round election is held, only first-round candidates with the support of at least 12.5% of eligible voters are allowed to participate, but if only 1 candidate meets that standard the two candidates with the highest number of votes in the first round may continue to the second round. In the second round, the candidate with a plurality is elected.

These are the deputies elected in the first round in 2022.

Party/coalition	Deputy	Constituency	Notes
NUPES (FI)	Sophia Chikirou	Paris's 6th constituency	
NUPES (FI)	Alexis Corbière	Seine-Saint-Denis's 7th constituency	
Ensemble (Horizons)	Yannick Favennec	Mayenne's 3rd constituency	
NUPES (FI)	Sarah Legrain	Paris's 16th constituency	
NUPES (FI)	Danièle Obono	Paris's 17th constituency	

== See also ==
- List of deputies elected in the first round of the 2017 French legislative election
