= Yannick Favennec =

French politician (born 1958)

Yannick Favennec Becot
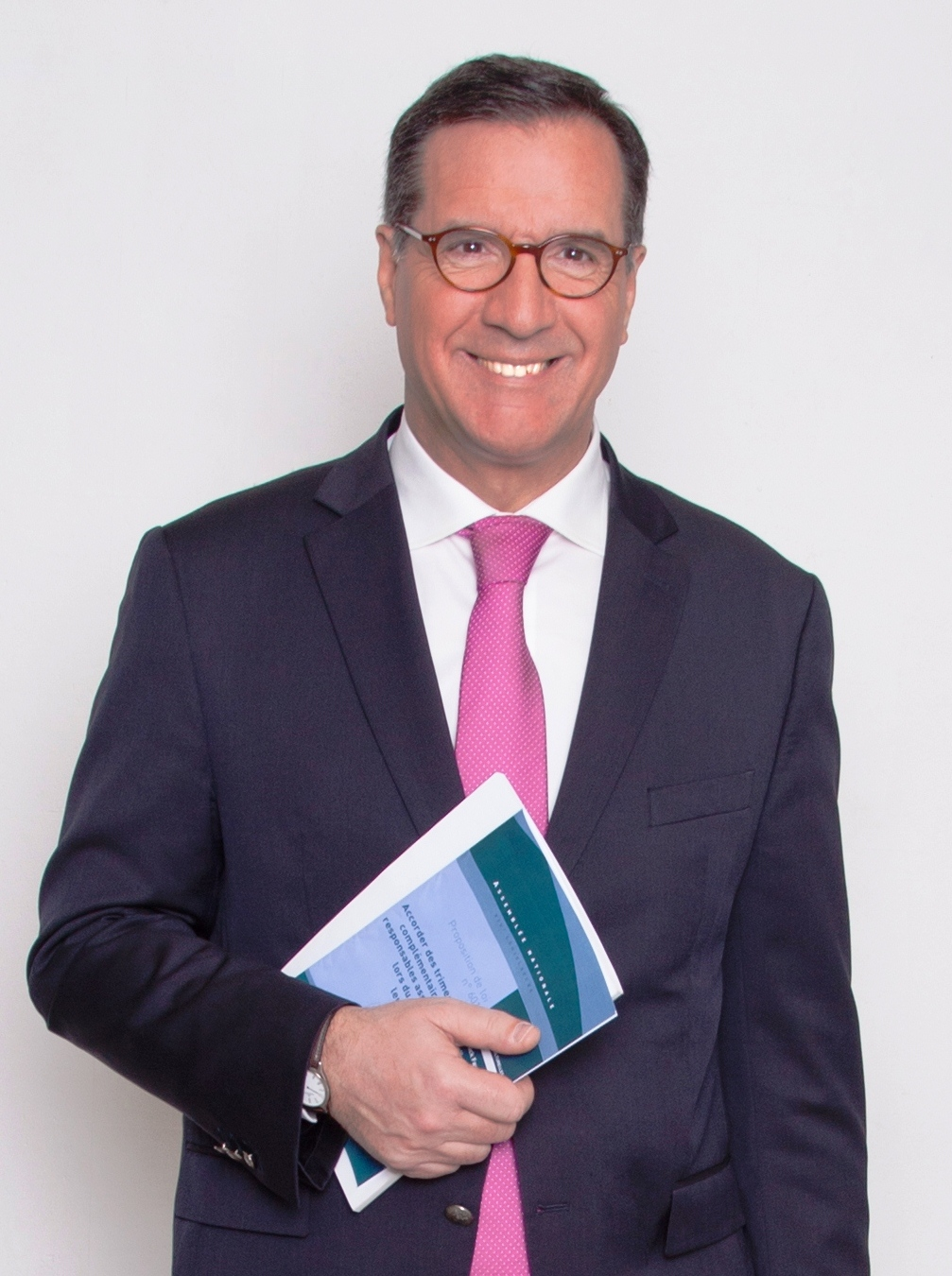

Member of the National Assembly for Mayenne's 3rd constituency
- Incumbent
- Assumed office 19 June 2002
- Preceded by: Roger Lestas

Personal details
- Born: 12 August 1958 (age 68) Chaudron-en-Mauges, France
- Party: Horizons (since 2022)
- Other political affiliations: UMP (until 2012); UDI (2012–2022)

Yannick Favennec Becot (born 12 August 1958) is a French politician of the Horizons party, within the Ensemble Citoyens coalition supporting incumbent President Emmanuel Macron, who has been serving as a member of the National Assembly since the 2002 elections, representing the Mayenne department.

== Political career ==
In parliament, Maine-et-Loire, Favennec Becot served on the Committee on Economic Affairs (2002–2012) and the Committee on Sustainable Development and Regional Planning (2012–2017) before moving to the Defence Committee in 2017. From 2017 to 2022, he was also a quaestor and therefore part of the Assembly's Bureau in the 15th legislature of the French Fifth Republic, under the leadership of president Richard Ferrand. In addition to his committee assignments, Favennec Becot is part of the French Parliamentary Friendship Group with the United Arab Emirates.

Ahed of the 2022 French legislative election, Favennec Becot joined Horizons, a centre-right party within Emmanuel Macron's centrist Ensemble Citoyens coalition. He was elected in the first round.

== Political positions ==
Ahead of the Republicans' 2016 primaries, Favennec Becot publicly endorsed Alain Juppé as the centre-right parties' candidate for the 2017 French presidential election.

In July 2019, Favennec Becot voted against the French ratification of the European Union's Comprehensive Economic and Trade Agreement (CETA) with Canada.
