= Loïc Bouvard =

French politician (1929–2017)

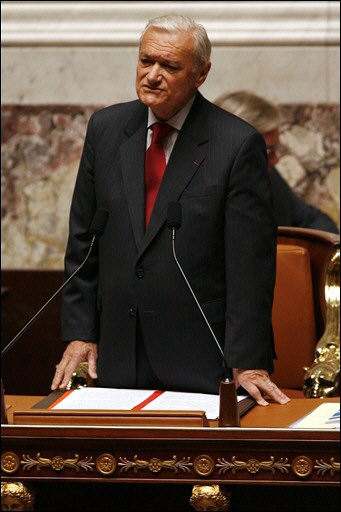

Member of the National Assembly for Morbihan's 4th constituency
- In office 1988–2012
- Succeeded by: Paul Molac

Personal details
- Born: 20 January 1929 Tours, France
- Died: 27 November 2017 (aged 88) Saint-Marcel, France
- Education: Sciences Po; Princeton University

Loïc Bouvard (20 January 1929 – 27 November 2017) was a member of the National Assembly of France. He represented the Morbihan department, and was a member of the Union for a Popular Movement.

== Personal ==
Loic Bouvard married Elizabeth Bouvard in 1969 in Reading, CT, USA. They have 5 children and 15 grand children. Loic Bouvard's father, Michel Bouvard, was a 4-Star General in the French Air Force, who liberated Toulon during World War II, and led the Air Force's Secret Services. Loic Bouvard's mother was Andrée Caron. Loic spent his childhood between Rio de Janeiro in Brazil where his father was assigned, Brittany where his father's family came from, and both Massillon in central France, and Paris where he studied after WWII.

== Education ==
After graduating from the Sciences Po and getting a law degree from the Sorbonne University, Loic Bouvard received a Fulbright Scholarship to study at Princeton University where he received a PhD in Political Sciences in 1953.

== World War II ==
During WWII, Loic Bouvard joined the French Resistance in Brittany, France as a member of the French Forces of the Interior. At 15 years old, he received the Croix de Guerre, with distinction, for the role he played. The Divisional General would say about him "Soldat FFI, jeune garçon d'un courage et d'un sang-froid remarquable, Loïc Bouvard a assuré de nombreuses missions périlleuses sur la ligne de front, faisant preuve, au milieu du combat, d'un courage et d'un esprit de sacrifice bien au-dessus de son âge". Several books - for instance, Les enfants dans les resistance– interviews, and documentaries tell his story.

== Career ==
After Princeton, Loic Bouvard started his career at Air France in New York as a special Assistant to the CEO for the Americas. After a few years there, he was recruited by McKinsey to work in Geneva and then open the Paris office of the firm. As he was becoming increasingly more active in politics, he founded his own consulting firm, Loic Bouvard, Inc.

In 1973, Loic was elected Deputy of the French Parliament. He was elected 9 consecutive times over 39 years from 1973 to 2012. In 1988, Loic became Vice President of the National Assembly and kept that role until 1997. In June 2007, as the oldest member of the National Assembly, he opened the XIII legislature with a recognized speech (see video).

Loic Bouvard was very involved in international relations. After joining the NATO Parliamentary Assembly in 1978, Loic was elected President from 1992 to 1994. He was one of the leading figures who steered the Assembly through the transformative years of the end of the Cold War. In recognition of his outstanding contribution to the development of the NATO PA partnerships at the end of the Cold War, in 2012 the Assembly created the “Loïc Bouvard” scholarship.

== Distinctions ==
- France: Croix de Guerre 1939-1945 with distinctions
- France: Legion of Honour, with military distinctions
- Morocco: Order of Ouissam Alaouite

== Death ==
He died on 27 November 2017, aged 88.
