= Morbihan's 4th constituency =

Constituency of the National Assembly of France

4th constituency of Morbihan
- inline Constituency of the National Assembly of France

- Constituency in Department

- Location of Morbihan in France
- Deputy: Paul Molac; LT
- Department: Morbihan
- Cantons: (pre-2015) Allaire, La Gacilly, Guer, Josselin, Malestroit, Mauron, Ploërmel, Questembert, Rochefort-en-Terre, La Trinité-Porhoët

The 4th constituency of Morbihan is a French legislative constituency in the Morbihan département. Like the other 576 French constituencies, it elects one MP using the two-round system, with a run-off if no candidate receives over 50% of the vote in the first round.

== Geography ==
The constituency covers the eastern areas of Morbihan.

== Description ==
At the 2017 election Paul Molac of En Marche! was one of only four candidates elected in the first round.

== Historic representation ==
Election	Member	Party
1988	Loïc Bouvard	UDF
2002	Loïc Bouvard	UMP
2007	Loïc Bouvard	UMP
2012	Paul Molac	DVG
2017	Paul Molac	LREM
2018	Paul Molac	LT
2022	Paul Molac	LT

== Election results ==
=== 2024 ===
Legislative Election 2024: Morbihan's 4th constituency
Party	Candidate	Votes	%	±%
REG	Paul Molac	29,912	35.84	−1.81
RN	Katel La Cuillier	25,414	31.51	+15.39
RE (Ensemble)	Rozenn Guégan	12,487	15.48	N/A
PCF (NFP)	Lhéa Le Flécher	11,809	14.64	−3.56
DVD	Bernard Huet	920	1.14	N/A
DVE	Khaled Mamar	602	0.75	N/A
LO	Patrice Crunil	515	0.64	N/A
Turnout		82,009	72.17	+19.35

=== 2022 ===
Legislative Election 2022: Morbihan's 4th constituency
Party	Candidate	Votes	%	±%
REG	Paul Molac	21,900	37.65	N/A
HOR (Ensemble)	Rozenn Guegan	10,624	18.26	-35.70
PCF (NUPÉS)	Lhea Le Flecher	10,589	18.20	+1.81
RN	Florent De Kersauson	9,377	16.12	+6.00
REC	Sophie Regnier	1,767	3.04	N/A
UDI (UDC)	Mario Louro	1,293	2.22	−12.22
Others	N/A	2,617	4.51	
Turnout		58,167	52.82	−1.46
2nd round result
REG	Paul Molac	37,678	73.43	N/A
HOR (Ensemble)	Rozenn Guegan	13,631	26.57	N/A
Turnout		51,309	48.32	N/A
REG gain from LREM				

=== 2017 ===
Candidate	Label	First round	
Candidate	Label	Votes	%
Paul Molac	REM	30,166	54.00
Marie-Hélène Herry	LR	8,074	14.45
Cécile Buchet	FI	6,791	12.16
Agnès Richard	FN	5,667	10.15
Nathalie Landriau-Berhault	ECO	2,285	4.09
David Cabas	DLF	952	1.70
Jean-Louis Amisse	EXG	638	1.14
Jean-Paul Félix	EXD	553	0.99
Christine Rault	DIV	377	0.67
Bernard Huet	DVD	349	0.62
France Savelli	ECO	6	0.01
Votes		55,858	100.00
Valid votes		55,858	97.91
Blank votes		898	1.57
Null votes		293	0.51
Turnout		57,049	54.28
Abstentions		48,060	45.72
Registered voters		105,109	
Source: Ministry of the Interior

=== 2012 ===
Legislative Election 2012: Morbihan's 4th constituency
Party	Candidate	Votes	%	±%
DVG	Paul Molac	16,142	26.14	N/A
UMP	François Gueant	15,896	25.74	−19.86
AC	Jean-Luc Bleher	9,080	14.71	N/A
DVG	Charles-Edouard Fichet	7,891	12.78	N/A
FN	Jean-Paul Felix	5,959	9.65	+6.84
MoDem	Michel Guegan	3,087	5.00	−4.41
FG	Alain Le Guennec	2,541	4.12	+2.19
Others	N/A	1,149	-	−
Turnout		61,745	60.44	−4.13
2nd round result
DVG	Paul Molac	32,197	52.56	N/A
UMP	François Gueant	29,064	47.44	−2.98
Turnout		61,261	59.97	−3.93
DVG gain from UMP				

=== 2007 ===
Legislative Election 2002: Morbihan's 4th constituency
Party	Candidate	Votes	%	±%
UMP	Loïc Bouvard	25,139	45.60	+15.67
PS	Béatrice Le Marre	18,019	32.68	+5.93
MoDem	Yvette Folliard	5,186	9.41	N/A
FN	Nicole Morhan	1,550	2.81	−2.82
LV	Gisèle Citharel	1,360	2.47	−0.04
Others	N/A	3,787	-	−
Turnout		56,333	64.57	−3.78
2nd round result
UMP	Loïc Bouvard	27,351	50.42	−6.63
PS	Béatrice Le Marre	26,893	49.58	+6.63
Turnout		55,744	63.90	−0.18
UMP hold				

=== 2002 ===
Legislative Election 2002: Morbihan's 4th constituency
Party	Candidate	Votes	%	±%
UMP	Loïc Bouvard	16,585	29.93	N/A
PS	Paul Paboeuf	14,824	26.75	+0.65
UDF	Cédric Bannel*	13,596	24.53	−20.89
FN	Nicole Morhan	3,119	5.63	−2.57
DVD	Michel Guegan	3,043	5.49	N/A
LV	Françoise Brie	1,392	2.51	−2.55
Others	N/A	2,858	-	−
Turnout		56,260	68.35	−3.21
2nd round result
UMP	Loïc Bouvard	29,067	57.05	N/A
PS	Paul Paboeuf	21,882	42.95	+0.05
Turnout		52,753	64.08	−8.22
UMP gain from FD				

* Withdrew before the 2nd round

=== 1997 ===
Legislative Election 2022: Morbihan's 4th constituency
Party	Candidate	Votes	%	±%
FD (UDF)	Loïc Bouvard	23,902	45.42	
PS	Paul Paboeuf*	13,734	26.10	
FN	Grégoire Tingaud	4,318	8.20	
LV	Claudine Rouillé	2,661	5.06	
DVD	Edmond Le Borgne	2,459	4.67	
MDC	Thérèse Baratte	1,706	3.24	
LDI	Richard Dubreuil	1,496	2.84	
GE	Patrice Renaud	1,346	2.56	
REG	Nicole Desury	1,006	1.91	
Turnout		55,290	71.56	
2nd round result
FD (UDF)	Loïc Bouvard	30,644	57.10	
PS	Paul Paboeuf*	23,020	42.90	
Turnout		55,850	72.30	
FD hold				

* PS dissident

== Sources ==
- Official results of French elections from 1998: "Résultats électoraux officiels en France" (in French).
