= Symbole =

Object used in France to punish students speaking languages other than French

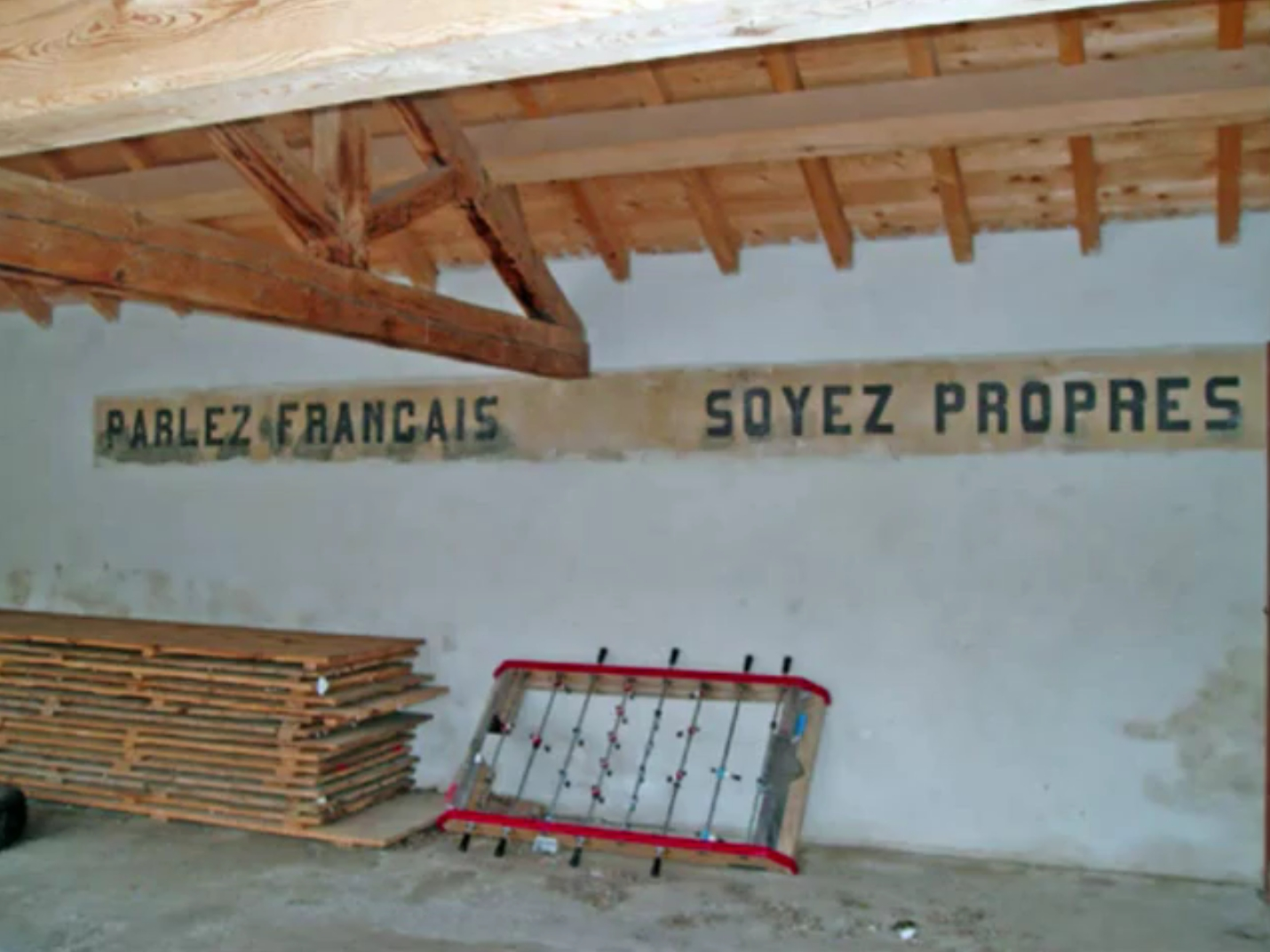
"Speak French, Be Clean" written on the wall of the Ayguatébia-Talau school

The symbole, also called ar vuoc'h ("the cow"), was an object used by Francophone headmasters in public and private schools in Brittany, French Flanders, Occitania, Basque Country and North Catalonia as a means of punishment for students caught speaking Breton, Flemish, Occitan, Basque, or Catalan during the 19th and 20th centuries.

Generally, the student was supposed to pass the symbole onto another of his fellow students after catching him speaking Breton, Occitan or Catalan (referred to as patois). The student in possession of the object at the end of recess, the half-day, or the day would be punished with, for example, manual labor, extra homework, corporal punishment, or organized mockery led by the headmaster.

== Nature of the object ==
The symbole could be:

- an ordinary wooden clog, sometimes not hollowed out, worn around the neck
- a slate worn around the neck. At the Plouaret public school from 1943 to 1949 students were required to write "je parle breton" ("I speak Breton") on the slate.
- an object to be carried in the pocket, such as a button, toy sabot, or badge.

The purpose of its use was:

- Exclusion of the targeted language (Breton, Occitan...) from school and play;
- Bringing mockery upon those who did not follow the established language rules;
- to help bring detriment upon students and prevent student solidarity.

== See also ==
- Welsh Not in Wales
- Vergonha in Occitania
- Dialect card in Japan

== Bibliography ==
- an Du, Claude (2000). Histoire d'un interdit. Le breton à l'école (in French) (2 ed.). Lannilis: Hor Yezh. ISBN 978-2-910699-41-3. OCLC 468997411.
- Broudic, Fañch [in French]. "Défense de cracher par terre et de parler breton ?". www.langue-bretonne.com (in French). Archived from the original on 2007-09-11.
- Calvet, Louis-Jean (1974). Linguistique et colonialisme. Petit traité de glottophagie (in French). Paris: Payot (éditions). ISBN 978-2-228114-30-1.
- Griffon, Yves (2008). La langue bretonne et l'école républicaine: témoignages de mémorialistes (in French). Lannion: Travaux d'Investigation et de Recherche. ISBN 978-2-917681-00-8. OCLC 471024545.
- Jaffrenou, Taldir [in French] (1985). Eñvorennoù (in Breton). Hor Yezh. ISBN 978-2-868630-06-3. OCLC 499973115.
- Norris, Sharon (2007-09-17). "ESRC Society Today - International Mother Language Day". Economic and Social Research Council. Archived from the original on 2009-01-06.
- Person, Yves [in French], ed. (1973-01-09). "Impérialisme linguistique et colonialisme". Les Temps Modernes: Minorités nationales en France. Revue Les Temps Modernes (in French). Vol. 324. Gallimard. ISBN 2-070288-11-0. Archived from the original on 2021-12-27.
- Prémel, Gérard (June 1995). "Anamnèse d'un hommage. Ou comment le français est venu aux Bretons". Langage et société (in French). 72: 51–95. doi:10.3406/lsoc.1995.2698. ISSN 2101-0382. Archived from the original on 2021-12-31.
