= Mayenne's 3rd constituency =

Constituency of the National Assembly of France

3rd constituency of Mayenne
- inline Constituency of the National Assembly of France

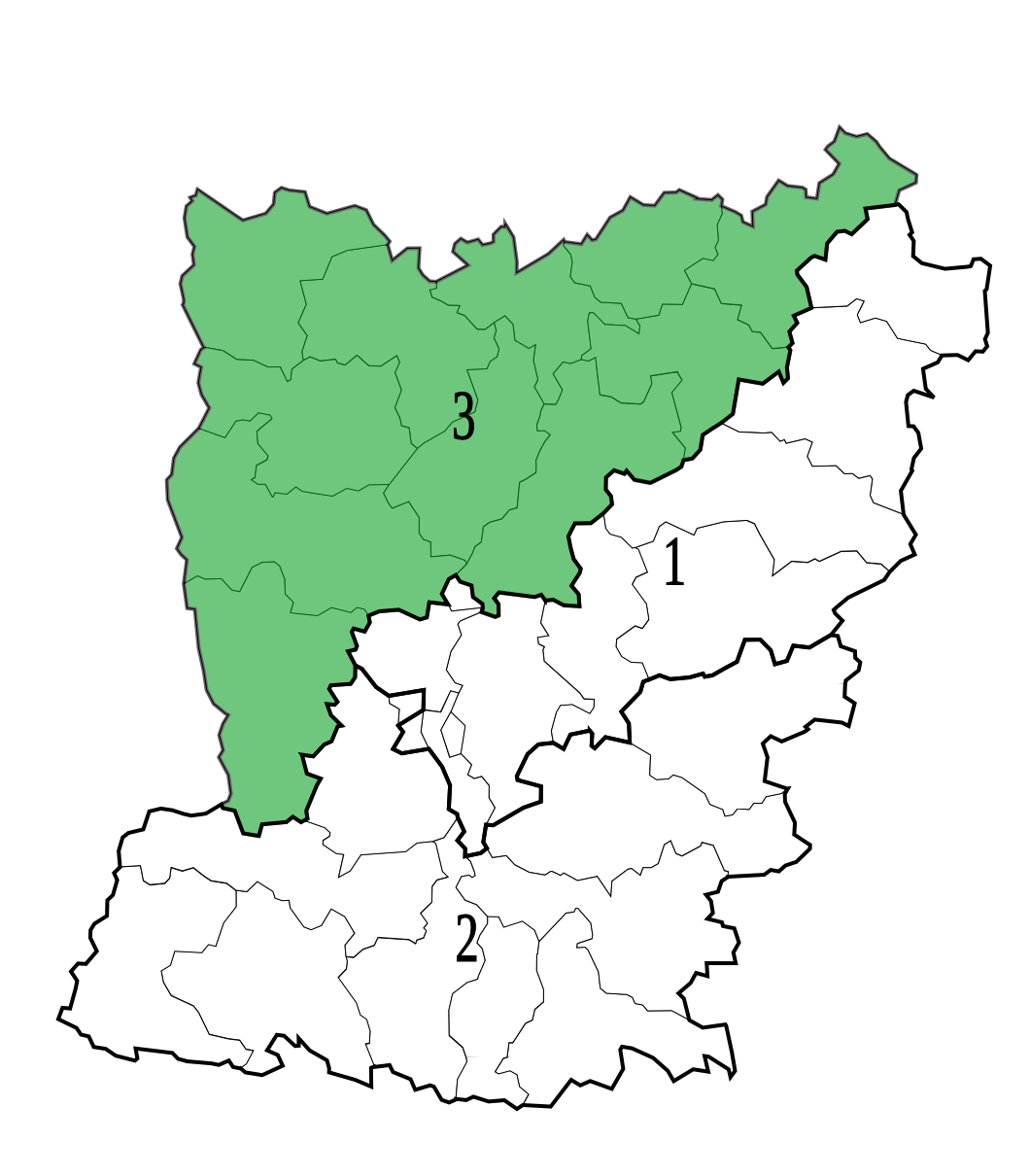
- Map of constituency (as defined in 2010) in department

- Location of Mayenne in France
- Deputy: Yannick Favennec; H
- Department: Mayenne
- Cantons: (pre-2015) Ambrières-les-Vallées, Chailland, Couptrain, Ernée, Gorron, Le Horps, Landivy, Laval Nord-Est, Lassay-les-Châteaux, Mayenne Est, Mayenne Ouest

The 3rd constituency of Mayenne is a French legislative constituency in the Mayenne département.

== Historic representation ==
Election	Member	Party
1988	Roger Lestas	UDF
1993	Roger Lestas	UDF
1997	Roger Lestas	UDF
2002	Yannick Favennec	UMP
2007	Yannick Favennec	UMP
2012	Yannick Favennec	UMP
2017	Yannick Favennec	UDI
2022	Yannick Favennec	H

== Election results ==
=== 2024 ===
Candidate	Party	Alliance	First round		Second round	
Candidate	Party	Alliance	Votes	%	Votes	%
Yannick Favennec	HOR	Ensemble	23,294	48.68	31,379	68.90
Annie Bell	RN		14,884	31.11	14,161	31.10
Graig Monetti	HOR	Ensemble	9,176	19.18		
Martine Amelin	LO		494	1.03		
Valid votes			47,848	97.28	45,540	95.69
Blank votes			867	1.76	1,428	3.00
Null votes			470	0.96	624	1.31
Turnout			49,185	67.70	47,592	65.49
Abstentions			23,470	32.30	25,080	34.51
Registered voters			72,655		72,672	
Result			HOR HOLD			

=== 2022 ===
Legislative Election 2022: Mayenne's 3rd constituency
Party	Candidate	Votes	%	±%
HOR (Ensemble)	Yannick Favennec*	19,187	57.13	+27.34
LFI (NUPÉS)	Marion Detais	6,491	19.33	+11.34
RN	Annie Bell	5,335	15.88	+8.49
REC	Amélie De Grandmaison	1,160	3.45	N/A
Others	N/A	1,413		
Turnout		33,586	47.90	−6.14
HOR gain from UDI				

* Favennec stood for UDI as part of the centre-right UDC alliance at the 2017 election. Shortly before the 2022 election, he joined Horizons, a member party of Emmanuel Macron's centrist Ensemble alliance.

=== 2017 ===
Candidate	Label	First round		Second round	
Candidate	Label	Votes	%	Votes	%
Yannick Favennec	UDI	16,004	42.16	19,405	61.53
Josselin Chouzy	REM	11,310	29.79	12,132	38.47
Monique Morand	FN	2,806	7.39		
Léa Raimbault	FI	2,599	6.85		
Grégory Heurtebize	DVD	1,449	3.82		
Sophie Leterrier	ECO	1,445	3.81		
Michel Neveu	PRG	714	1.88		
Maud Jan-Brusson	PCF	433	1.14		
Claudine Chartier	DLF	399	1.05		
Sylvie Delogé	DIV	240	0.63		
Gauthier Dupont	ECO	213	0.56		
Marie-Paule Seigneur	EXG	204	0.54		
Charlotte Le Corre	DIV	145	0.38		
Bernadette Bresard	ECO	0	0.00		
Votes		37,961	100.00	31,537	100.00
Valid votes		37,961	97.66	31,537	92.99
Blank votes		607	1.56	1,665	4.91
Null votes		302	0.78	712	2.10
Turnout		38,870	54.04	33,914	47.15
Abstentions		33,061	45.96	38,016	52.85
Registered voters		71,931		71,930	
Source: Ministry of the Interior

=== 2012 ===
Legislative Election 2012: Mayenne's 3rd constituency
Party	Candidate	Votes	%	±%
UMP	Yannick Favennec	23,152	53.94	
EELV	Christian Quinton	12,153	28.31	
FN	Bruno De La Moriniere	3,394	7.91	
FG	Hervé Eon	1,808	4.21	
MoDem	Alexandra Leuliette	1,478	3.44	
Others	N/A	936		
Turnout		42,921	59.33	
UMP hold				

=== 2007 ===
Legislative Election 2007: Mayenne 3rd
Party	Candidate	Votes	%	±%
UMP	Yannick Favennec	26,703	58.95	
PS	Jean-Pierre Le Scornet	10,248	22.62	
MoDem	Pierrick Tranchevent	2,642	5.83	
LV	Jean-Claude Maignan	1,902	4.20	
FN	Bruno de la Morinière	834	1.84	
LCR	Bénédicte Pelletier	723	1.60	
PCF	Yannick Peltier	676	1.49	
MPF	Viviane Chanteloup	531	1.17	
LO	Marie-Paule Seigneur	520	1.15	
Independent	Philippe Jourdin	338	0.75	
MNR	Marie-Madeleine Billeau	181	0.40	
Turnout		46,529	64.62	
UMP hold		Swing		

== Sources ==
- Official results of French elections from 1998: "Résultats électoraux officiels en France" (in French). Archived from the original on 20 December 2011.
