= Dialect card =

Punitive mark used in Japanese education

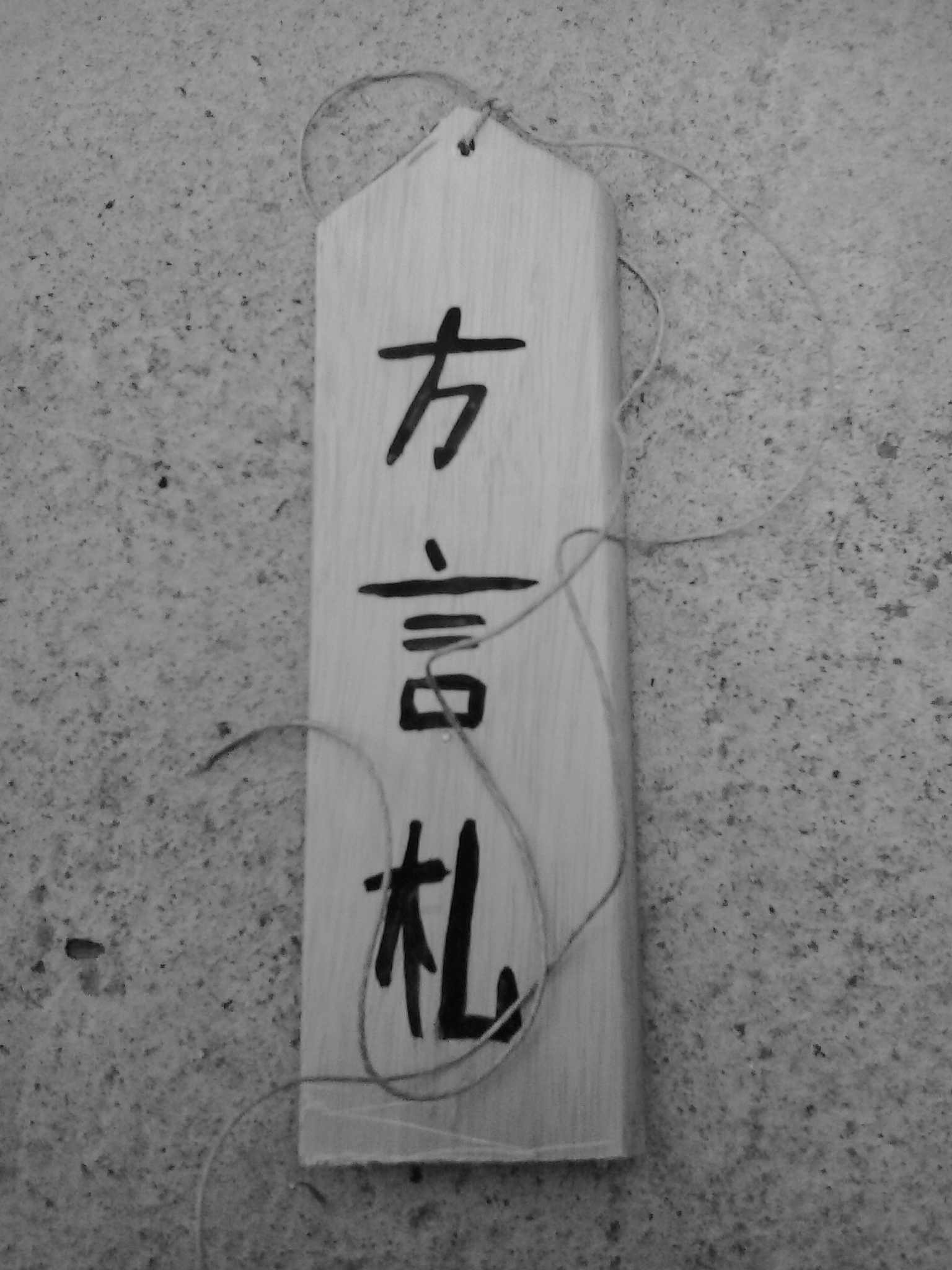
A dialect card

A dialect card (Japanese: 方言札, Hepburn: hōgen fuda) was a type of card used in a punishment system of Japanese regional schools in the post-Meiji period to promote the Tokyo dialect of Japanese over other Japanese dialects and other Japonic languages. A student who spoke in dialect would be forced to wear the card until another student also spoke in dialect, and then it would pass to the new transgressor; the student wearing it at the end of the school day received corporal punishment by the teachers or would receive deductions from their grades at the end of the school year.

== Background ==
During the Edo period under the Tokugawa shogunate, most Japanese people could not travel outside of their home domain. As a result, regional Japanese dialects were relatively isolated and became increasingly distinct. After the Meiji Restoration the government, in emulation of the European nation states, sought to create a standard Japanese speech. A Tokyo dialect, specifically that of the upper-class Yamanote area, became the model for Standard Japanese, widely used in schools, publishing, and radio broadcasting. By the early twentieth century, the Ministry of Education and other authorities instituted various policies to reduce or suppress regional differences.

== Implementation ==
The use of the dialect card was most prominent in the Tōhoku, Kyushu and Ryukyu Islands (including Okinawa) as they are geographically and linguistically most distant from the Tokyo dialect. The issue is most prominent in regard to Ryukyuan languages as there are groups, such as the Kariyushi Club, which advocate the languages to be officially recognised by the Japanese government as a language (and Ryukyu as a nation). In Okinawa, many faced discrimination due to Okinawan language and culture being seen as inferior to Standard Japanese and the cultures of other prefectures. Likely due to this and some Okinawans also desiring a lingua franca, the card was initially voluntarily adopted by Okinawan students at the start of the 20th century. However, the use of dialect cards became mandatory as assimilation policies increased following 1917.

== Cultural interaction ==
In 2024, the Welsh message of 1923 Welsh Women's Peace was translated into Okinawan language from the perspective of the similarities between the Okinawan dialect card and the Welsh Not policy in Wales. The Asahi Shimbun newspaper in Japan claimed that the reconstruction of the Okinawan language can be taken as a reference from the reconstruction of the Welsh language. Keiichiro Nemoto also created a short film inspired by the similarities between the history of Okinawan dialect card and Welsh Not in Wales.

== See also ==
- Codification
- Language planning
- Prestige (sociolinguistics)
- Usage
- Symbole, a similar punishment for Breton-speaking students
- Welsh Not, a similar punishment for Welsh-speaking students.
