= Welsh Not =

Punitive device formerly used in schools

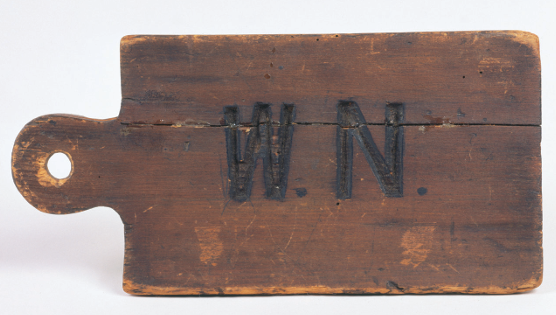
Welsh Not found at Garth school, Bangor

The Welsh Not was a token used by teachers at some schools in Wales, mainly in the 19th century, to discourage children from speaking Welsh, by marking out those who were heard speaking the language. It could be followed by an additional discipline, sometimes involving corporal punishment. There is evidence of the Welsh Not's use from the end of 18th to the start of the 20th century, but it was most common in the early- to mid-19th century.

There was a widespread belief in Wales in the 19th century that it was beneficial for children to learn English. The token known as the Welsh Not was not part of any government policy, but was seen by teachers as a way to encourage children to learn English. Over time, however, excluding Welsh began to be viewed as an ineffective way of teaching English. By the end of the 19th century schools were encouraged to use some Welsh in lessons though many schools in Welsh-speaking areas remained predominantly English-language, but some teachers continued to discourage the use of Welsh.

Accounts suggest that the form and use of the Welsh Not varied from place to place, but it was most commonly a piece of wood. It was sometimes hung on a string around the child's neck. Numerous names were used in contemporary sources; the Welsh Not became the most common name in the 20th century. The token remains prominent in Welsh collective memory.

== Terminology ==
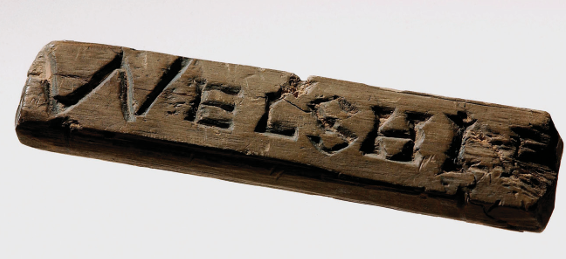
Welsh Not found at Capel Pen-rhiw, Drefach Felindre, Carmarthenshire

The Welsh Not came in several forms and was used in differing ways. It was also known by other names, including Welsh not, Welsh note, Welsh lump, Welsh stick, Welsh lead, cwstom, Welsh Mark, and Welsh Ticket. The name Welsh Note was more common in the 19th century than Welsh Not. Martin Johnes, an historian who has studied the subject, suggests that the latter term may have originated from Welsh speakers struggling to pronounce the English word "note", since many Welsh people at the time had little knowledge of that language; this may have contributed to the punishment being seen as an outside imposition. Welsh Not became the main term used in the 20th century.

== Overview ==
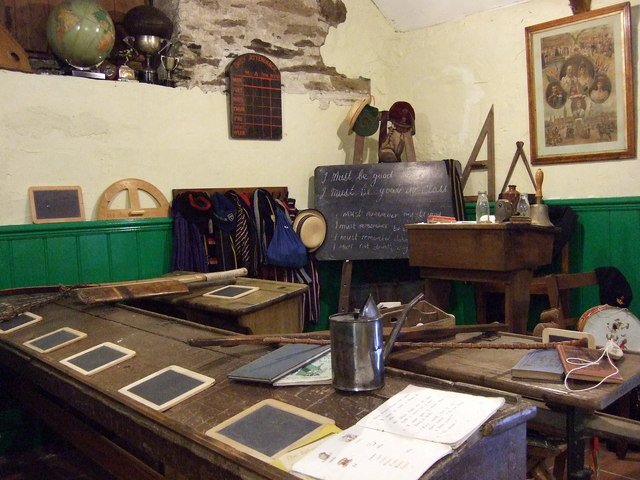
Recreation of an old school classroom at the West Wales Museum of Childhood, Llangeler, with a Welsh Not on the right-hand side of the desk

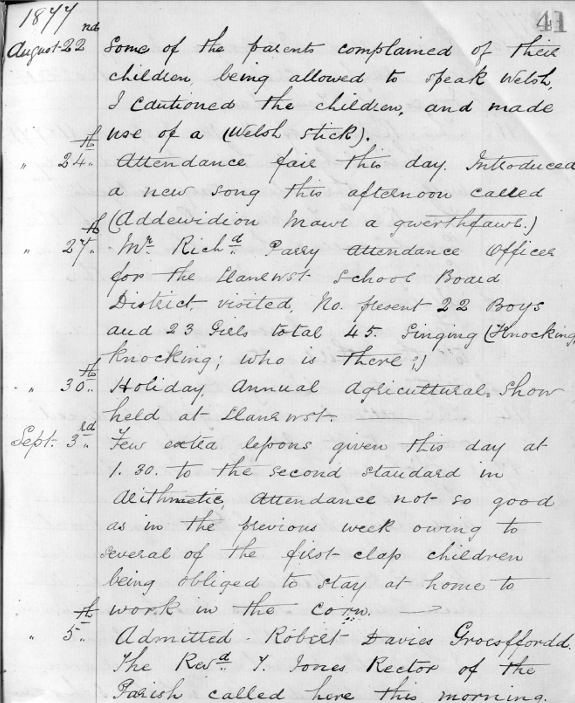
Records of a school in Llanddoged. The top entry for 22 August 1877 reads "Some of the parents complained of their children being allowed to speak Welsh, I cautioned the children, and made use of a (Welsh Stick)".

During the 19th century, a primary function of day schools in Wales was the teaching of English. The teaching of English in Welsh schools was generally supported by the Welsh public and parents who saw it as the language of economic advancement. Some schools practised what is now commonly called total immersion English language teaching and banned the use of Welsh in the school and playground to force children to use and become proficient in English.

Some schools punished children caught speaking Welsh with the Welsh Not. This was a token typically made of wood often inscribed with the letters 'WN' or a similar phrase. It might be worn around the neck or carried. Typically, following the start of some prescribed period of time, a lesson, the school day or the school week, it was given to the first child heard speaking Welsh and would then be successively passed on to the next child heard speaking it. At the end of the period, the child with the token or all children who had held the token, might be punished. The nature of that punishment varies from one account to another; it might have been detention, the writing out of lines, or corporal punishment. An article published in 1900 in Perl y Plant (Children's Pearl), a Welsh language youth magazine, gave the following description of the Welsh Not's use at a school in Carmarthenshire during the 1860s:

Behind the door, hanging on a nail, was a small board, the breadth of a hand, and written on it was 'Welsh not' ... if a word of Welsh was spoken (which was done often) the Welsh not was thrown around the offender’s neck at once, and he would have to carry it to his great shame. But if he heard anyone else speaking Welsh he had the right to transfer it to the new offender. At the end of the day, the one with the Welsh not went to the teacher’s desk to receive his punishment before the whole school, and the punishment was the rod four times on the offender’s two hands.

Some teachers viewed the use of the device as a "mode of instruction", forcing children to practise English. It may be compared with the approach to language teaching in some other Western European countries, whereby children were discouraged from using minority languages. For example, children who spoke Irish, Scottish Gaelic and various minority languages in France at school were sometimes punished through public identification. A story published in 1832, in the youth edition of the annual Forget-Me-Not, discussed a French-language school for English girls at the start of the century. It described pupils being given "an oval piece of wood, with "ENGLISH", in large capitals, engraved on its front, suspended by a riband from the neck" as a punishment for speaking that language. The Welsh Not was also intended to force children to help with enforcing discipline by making them identify those who spoke Welsh. This was also a way of keeping solely Welsh-speaking children quiet; enforcing silence was considered important for managing a school.

The Welsh Not was not a government policy. Some of the local committees and School Boards that administered non-private schools instructed teachers to refrain from using Welsh but most did not. The Welsh Not was a practice introduced by individual teachers mostly on their own initiative. According to Johnes, parents were generally supportive of physical punishment in schools and appear to have been accepting of the Welsh Not.

=== History ===
"My attention [at a school in Llandyrnog, Denbighshire] was attracted to a piece of wood, suspended by a string round a boy’s neck, and on the wood were the words, ‘Welsh stick.’ This, I was told, was a stigma for speaking Welsh. But, in fact, his only alternative was to speak Welsh or to say nothing. He did not understand English, and there is no systematic exercise in interpretation."

— 1847 government report on Welsh education.

Johnes wrote that the practice of "shaming" students may have originated in early modern grammar schools which aimed to teach Latin. The first evidence of practices resembling the Welsh Not dates from around the 1790s; for instance, Reverend Richard Warner, in A Second Walk Through Wales (1800), wrote about schools in Flintshire: "to give the children a perfect knowledge of the English tongue ... [the teachers force] the children to converse in it ... if ... one of them be detected in speaking a Welsh word, he is immediately degraded with the Welsh lump" (a piece of lead tied around the child's neck with string). Accounts of the Welsh Not most frequently relate to the early- to mid-19th century. Robert Smith, citing local studies by other historians, argues that the Welsh Not was mostly used before 1870. There are records of it being used almost everywhere in Wales; but it was less common in Monmouthshire and Glamorgan, where English was more established. Accounts of children being beaten for speaking Welsh became less common after 1850; the penalty was increasingly likely to be non-physical where the Welsh Not was still used.

Efforts by teachers to prohibit the speaking of Welsh in schools gradually became less common in the late 19th century. The punishments used where prohibitions were in force were increasingly likely to be non-physical and less embarrassing for the children (e.g additional schoolwork). However, some corporal punishment for speaking Welsh at school did continue. Prohibitions on Welsh were most common in rural, heavily Welsh-speaking areas where teaching English was difficult. Some use of the Welsh Not continued throughout the late-19th century. In the late 19th century, the use and teaching of Welsh in schools began to receive moderate government support. A few people, who grew up at the beginning of the 20th century, recalled in interviews that they saw or knew of the Welsh Not being used when they were children. However, there is no written evidence of the practice being used after 1900.

== Background ==
=== Laws in Wales Acts ===
Under Henry VIII the Laws in Wales Acts 1535 and 1542 simplified the administration and the law in Wales. English law and norms of administration were to be used, replacing the complex mixture of regional Welsh laws and administration. Public officials had to be able to speak English and English was to be used in the law courts. These two language provisions probably made little difference since English had already replaced French as the language of administration and law in Wales in the late 14th century. In practice this meant that courts had to employ translators between Welsh and English. The courts were 'very popular' with the working class possibly because they knew the jury would understand Welsh and the translation was only for the benefit of the lawyers and judges. The use of English in the law courts inevitably resulted in significant inconvenience to those who could not speak English. Johnes argues that this may have contributed to a belief developing among the Welsh public that it was beneficial to speak English in a Kingdom dominated by England.

Johnes writes that as the Act granted the Welsh equality with the English in law, that the result was "the language actually regained ground in Welsh towns and rural anglicised areas such as the lowlands of Gwent and Glamorgan" and that thus "Welsh remained the language of the land and the people". Furthermore, Johnes writes that the religious turmoil at the time persuaded the state to support, rather than try to extinguish, the Welsh language. In 1546, Brecon man John Prys had published the first Welsh-language book (Welsh: Yny lhyvyr hwnn, "In This Book"), a book containing prayers, which, as the Pope disapproved of it, endeared it to the Crown. The result of the 1567 order by the Crown that a Welsh translation of the New Testament be used in every parish church in Wales (to ensure uniformity of worship in the Kingdom of England) was that Welsh would remain the language of religion. John Davies says that as the (Tudor) government were to promote Welsh for worship, they had more sympathy for Welsh, than for Irish in Ireland, French in Calais, and than the government of Scotland had for Gaelic of the Highlands. The Tudors themselves were of partly Welsh origin.

=== 19th century and early 20th century ===
[Question] "as far as your experience goes, there is a general desire for education, and the parents are desirous that their children should learn the English language?" [Reply] "Beyond anything."

— Anglican clergyman from Pembrokeshire giving evidence to the Inquiry for South Wales in 1843

The only areas of Wales where English was widely spoken in the first half of the 19th century were places close to the Anglo-Welsh border, the Gower Peninsula and southern Pembrokeshire. Immigration, mainly from England, into the industrialising areas, caused the language to become more widespread in those areas. Many Welsh speakers were keen for their children to learn English; knowing the language was felt to be a route to social mobility, made life more convenient and was a status symbol. Contemporaries often said that parents wanted schools to be conducted in English. For instance, the Rev Bowen Jones of Narberth told an inquiry following the Rebecca Riots that a school conducted in Welsh in his area was unsuccessful, while, in schools where the schoolmaster was expected to teach and speak only English, there was not enough space to accommodate all the children who wanted to attend. The upper- and middle-classes in Wales, who generally spoke English, were also eager for the masses to learn the language. They believed it would contribute to Wales's economic development and that tenants or employees who could speak English would be easier to manage.

In the 1830s and 1840s the Welsh language became increasingly associated in the eyes of the government with the social unrest taking place in Wales. The government announced "an inquiry into the state of education, especially into the means afforded the labouring classes of acquiring a knowledge of the English language" in the early 1840s. The three commissioners were English and could not speak Welsh. The Welsh-speaking assistants they employed and the witnesses the enquiry spoke to were largely Anglicans. The report, released in 1847, caused great offence in Wales because of its negative depiction of the Welsh language and the moral character of the Welsh people. The report described Welsh people as alcoholics, unintelligent and, in the case of women, sexually immoral. It complimented aspects of the Welsh national character, such as a desire for education. It was nicknamed Brad y Llyfrau Gleision (The Treason of the Blue Books). Nonconformists generally interpreted the report as an English and Anglican attack on the Welsh, and some Anglican churchmen criticised its harsh tone. The report argued that there was widespread support in Wales for learning English and that bilingualism in schools would be the most effective way of teaching English. The report was critical of schools that tried to exclude Welsh, seeing it as an ineffective way of teaching English, and described the Welsh Not negatively.

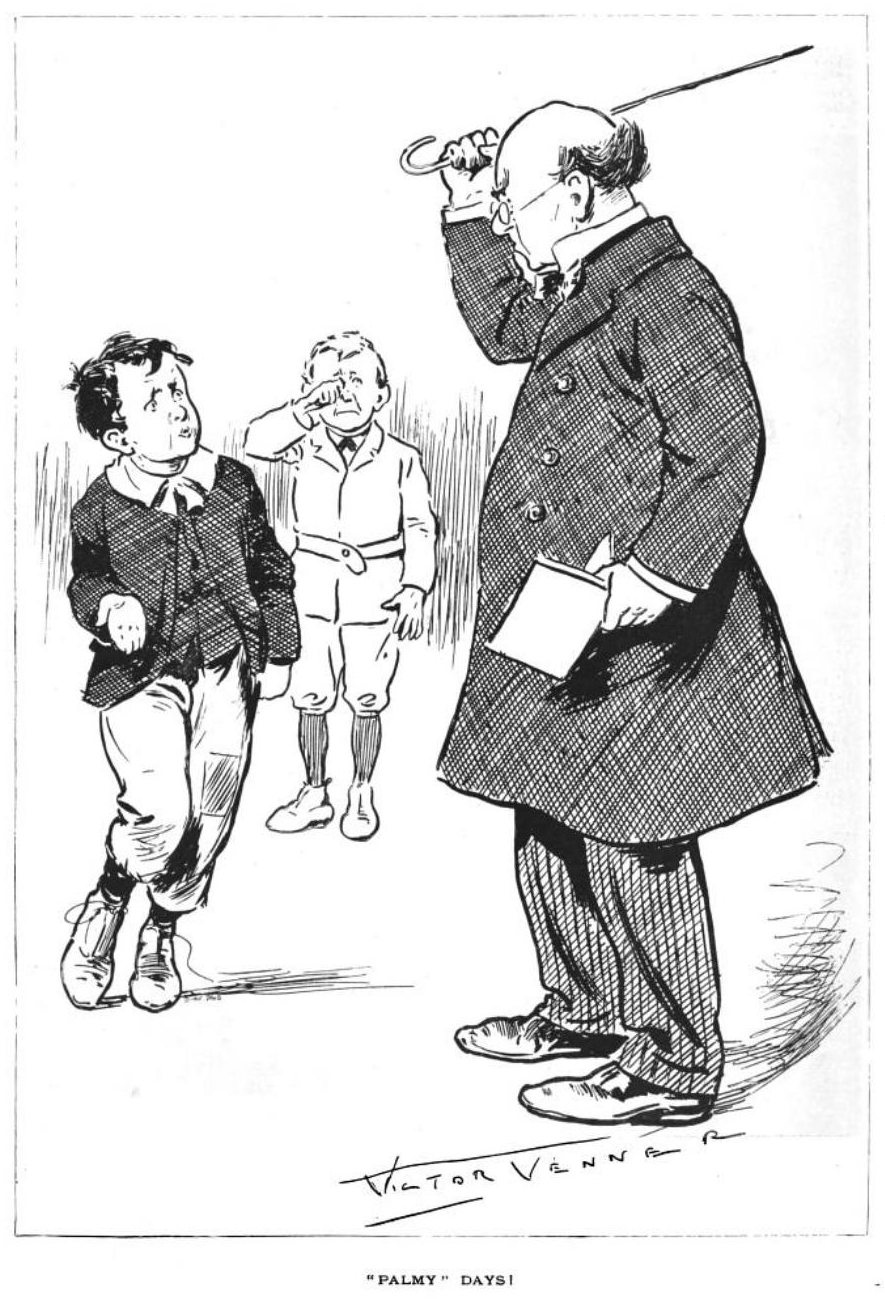
Palmy' Days!, satirical cartoon of schoolboys being caned, by Victor Venner in The Sketch (1901)

Corporal punishment was legal in British schools until the late 20th century. James Pillans, a Scottish educationalist, joked in 1856 that the common view was "a competent knowledge of Greek and Latin can only be secured to a boy by flogging it into him". Welsh schools, in the first half of the 19th century, emphasised strict discipline. Physical punishment was common in this period. However, in many schools it did not happen regularly. A participant in the 1847 report, who investigated North Wales, commented that while corporal punishments were used in most schools "I have seldom seen it actually administered except by ignorant and petulant teachers" instead children were "habitually governed by fear". Teachers were being encouraged to limit their use of physical punishment in the second half of the century. Most schools continued to use physical punishment; but in some, it became relatively uncommon. Johnes suggests that, throughout the 19th century, individuals' memories could exaggerate the extent of corporal punishment as it was easier to remember the experience than the frequency with which it happened. Humiliation was also a common form of discipline at many schools in the first half of the 19th century; some used a Late Note to identify those who failed to be punctual. Joseph Lancaster, an educationalist of the early 19th century, encouraged the use of humiliation to punish children. This practice was being discouraged by the late 19th century.

HMI Shadrach Price commented in the early 1880s that children were increasingly starting school with some knowledge of English. Children practised the language by playing with the children of English-speaking migrants in some areas. In others, tourism and commerce increased local people's exposure to English. Increased use of Welsh in schools made the teaching of English more effective. In the 1891 census, the first to ask about language abilities in Wales, 69% of people over the age of two were listed as able to speak English. The proportion of people over the age of three who were listed as English-speakers increased to 91 per cent in the 1911 census.

On the 1891 census, 45% of people in Wales were listed as solely English-speakers. This group had increased to 63% in the 1921 census and 72% by 1951. In the late 19th and early 20th centuries, industrial areas of eastern Wales attracted a large number of migrants from England and Ireland. In these areas, English increasingly replaced Welsh as the language used in public situations such as workplaces and children's games. Studies conducted in more English-speaking areas in the late 19th century suggested that some Welsh-speakers were not passing Welsh onto their children; although, it is unclear how common this was. A 1927 government report indicated that, in urban areas, a significant proportion of secondary school pupils with Welsh-speaking parents were not regularly speaking the language at home. Johnes suggests that language change may have happened gradually; first language Welsh-speakers increasingly speaking English in private as they used it more in public.

The spread of English did not necessarily lead to the decline of Welsh. For instance, a man born in 1890 said in an interview in old age that being educated in English had no effect on the language used in his village because everyone he knew spoke Welsh. Some contemporaries believed that education was changing children's preferred language from Welsh to English and certain teachers discouraged the use of Welsh at home in the early 20th century. Johnes argues that children may have been influenced if their teachers encouraged them to speak English outside of school or told them that Welsh had little value. He felt that the experience of having Welsh excluded from their education would likely have had more influence later in life, contributing to adult Welsh speakers in more English-speaking areas choosing to raise their children in English. However, there is no evidence of individuals saying that they did not pass on Welsh to their children because of their schooling. Johnes suggests that schools' emphasis on teaching British, rather than specifically Welsh, patriotism may have also contributed to Welsh-speakers choosing to raise their children in English.

== Reactions and impact ==
Government investigations in the mid-19th century indicated that excluding Welsh was not an effective way of teaching English. Some teachers made use of Welsh to help teach English in that period; for instance, a teacher working in Llwyn-y-gell, Blaenau Ffestiniog told a government investigation in 1861 that his younger pupils, between 7 and 10 years old, needed lessons translated into Welsh. In the late 19th century, more Welsh began to be used informally in lessons to help facilitate the teaching of English. For instance, children might be given Welsh explanations of their English reading material or be given tasks translating between the two languages. This frequently happened even at schools where children were punished for speaking Welsh. A campaign developed for Welsh to be included in the curriculum. Between 1889 and 1893, a series of changes were made to government policy: teachers in Welsh-speaking areas were now encouraged to teach English through Welsh, and schools could benefit financially from teaching Welsh as a subject.

The Welsh Department in the Board of Education encouraged the use of Welsh in lessons after its creation in 1907. Though teachers and parents in Welsh-speaking areas, whose priority was children learning English, often resisted this. Gareth Elwyn Jones, an historian of Welsh education, suggests that English continued to be viewed as the language of economic advancement by the Welsh public until the post-Second World War period. Some evidence exists of children being physically punished for speaking Welsh at school in the middle of the 20th century. (Note: There are anecdotal accounts of schoolchildren being hit for speaking Welsh in the 1950s. In 1971, a Welsh individual living in Leicester, England, wrote in a letter to a local newspaper that they could remember being caned for speaking Welsh at school playtime "only 30 years ago".)

=== Popular culture ===
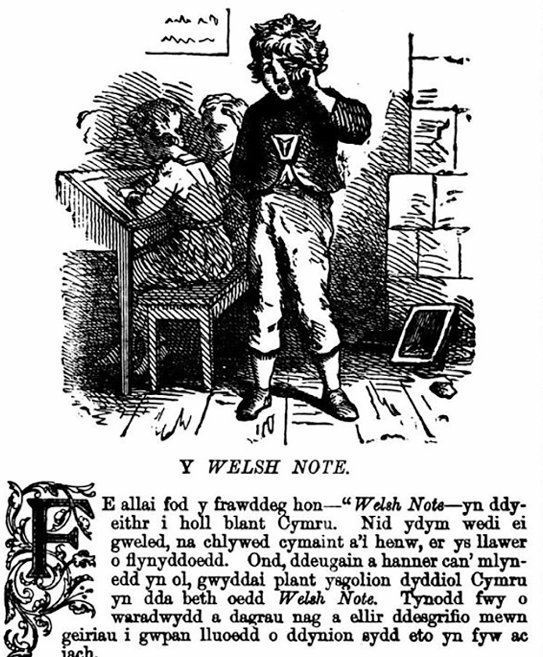
Y Welsh Note (The Welsh Note), engraving published in a Welsh language youth magazine Trysorfa y Plant (A children's treasury) (1879) (Note: The paragraph reads "The phrase – Welsh Note – might be unfamiliar to all the children of Wales. We have not seen nor heard so much as its name for many years. But forty and fifty years ago, the children of the day schools of Wales knew well what the Welsh Note was. It drew more reproaches and tears than can be described in words to many men who are still alive and well.")

Johnes commented that the Welsh Not is part of Welsh collective memory. It is frequently assumed to have been a policy introduced by the British government and those who feel that England has treated Wales unfairly often see the Welsh Not as an example. Gareth Wynne Jones, an historian, argued in 2000: "Over the years the Welsh Not became and, in much popular memory remains, the ultimate symbol of coercion of the Welsh people by an alien, colonial power intent on the subjugation of a nation's language and, by implication, its soul."

Adults who experienced the Welsh Not as children recalled it with differing emotions, including anger, indifference and humour. In the late 19th and early 20th centuries several accounts were published of this method of discipline, which described it as having been used at an unclear point in the relatively recent past. Some writers in this period saw the Welsh Not as something imposed on Wales by England or the British government with the aim of destroying the Welsh language; others disagreed, often seeing it as a result of Welsh people's desire to learn English. The best-selling novel How Green Was My Valley (1939) by Richard Llewellyn includes an emotive description of the practice, which Johnes considers one of the most influential depictions of the punishment:

About her neck a piece of new cord, and from the cord, a board that hung to her shins and cut her as she walked. Chalked on the board ... I must not speak Welsh in school ... And the board dragged her down, for she was small, an infant, and the card rasped the flesh of her neck, and there were marks upon her shins where the edge of the board had cut. Loud she cried ... and in her eyes the big tears of a child who is hurt, and has shame, and is frightened.

Saunders Lewis, a Welsh nationalist politician, argued in a 1962 radio lecture that it was a "fact that extermination of Welsh was a political policy". That year, Wynne Melville Jones wore a costume which included a Welsh Not at a carnival in Tregaron to protest the decision of a local factory to prohibit its employees speaking Welsh in work hours. Daniel Parry-Jones wrote in Welsh Children's Games and Pastimes (1964) that, while he had not experienced the Welsh Not himself, he knew how "terribly painful it is [to be caned on the hands], and how any child would stoop to involve even his best friend to escape it, suffering inevitably, I am sure, by this practice of the Welsh Not, some early moral injury."

During the 1970s, campaigners for the promotion of the Welsh language often referenced the Welsh Not. Dafydd Iwan's song Baled y Welsh Not (1979) [The Welsh Not Ballad] portrays schools as unhappy environments where Welsh was excluded. A 1975 BBC documentary on the history of Welsh opened with a teacher giving a girl the Welsh Not and telling her that she was at risk of becoming a savage. The narrator then stated that the authorities had intentionally and successfully destroyed the language. Guidance for teachers published in 1978 encouraged them to play-act the Welsh Not with their pupils. However, most school textbooks on Welsh history from that period did not mention the punishment. Johnes suggests this might have been because issues relating to the Welsh language were politically controversial. In 1983, a group of children involved in a protest advocating for an expansion of Welsh-medium education wore pretend Welsh Nots outside the Welsh Office.

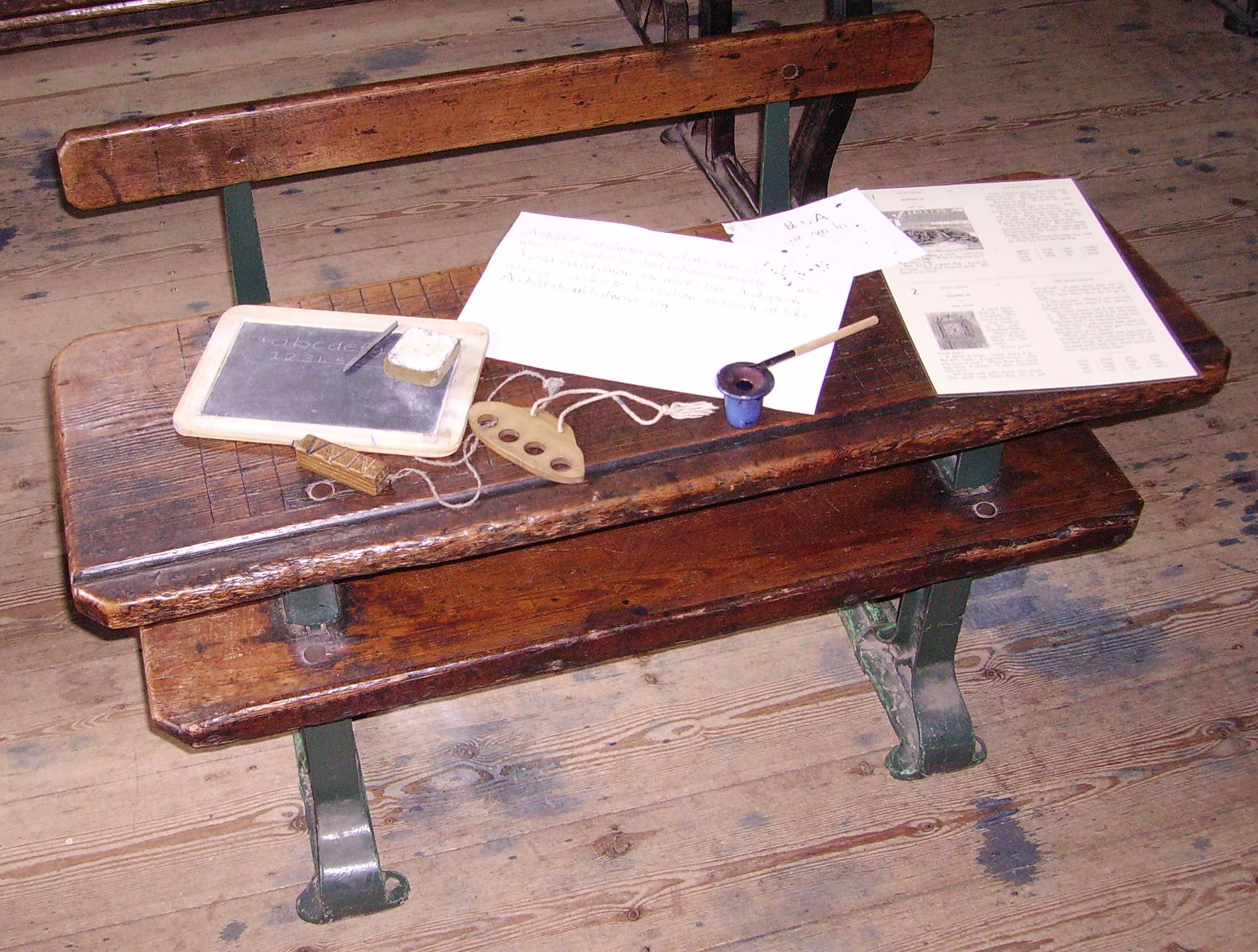
Display, including a Welsh Not, at Maestir School, St Fagans National Museum of History (2007)

The British Government continued to be blamed by some for the Welsh Not in the early 21st century. The Welsh: A Biography (2012), a popular history book by Terry Breverton, commented that the Blue Books report had ordered "anyone caught speaking Welsh were to be severely punished", and 52 Times When Britain Was a Bellend (2019) by James Felton stated that "the English" had imposed the Welsh Not on Wales's schools. Fiona G. H. Wells, an author writing in 2000, argued that the Welsh Not was still influencing those who believed that one could only be successful using the English language. The punishment was also referenced by those who felt the dominance of Welsh-medium schools in some areas was unfair on English-speaking families or who alleged that children were being punished for speaking English at these schools. It became a common topic in school teaching materials about Welsh history. St Fagans National Museum of History, a popular destination for Welsh primary school trips, has a recreated Victorian school used for play-acting lessons which includes a Welsh Not. Stories of the use of the punishment were passed down within families, and social media users have shared accounts of their ancestors' experiences of it.

In the early 21st century some commentators expressed doubts about the popular view of the Welsh Not. A 2010 BBC documentary said that common assumptions about the punishment were incorrect but did not specify what these were. David T. C. Davies, a Welsh Conservative politician, argued in 2012 that the Welsh Not was "largely a myth used to stir up anti-English prejudice". Some popular history books about Wales made little or no comment on the Welsh Not. For instance, History Grounded (2021) by Elin Jones, a book about Welsh history intended for children, included a drawing of a Welsh Not being worn but did not explain what it was.

=== Historians ===
Academic texts on wider topics have often made brief comments on the Welsh Not. Gwyn A. Williams, while giving little detail, commented that the punishment was "notorious". He argued that many teachers engaged in "cultural genocide", that this was "not very effective" but damaged the language's reputation. Academic texts have often given little evidence for the Welsh Not's use. Russell Davies wrote, in an academic work on 19th century Carmarthenshire, that many teachers used the punishment. However, he did not give any accounts of this from local school records which he used as evidence in other sections of the work. Some historians have argued that the Welsh Not was less widespread. John Davies commented that the "mythology of the twentieth century" had probably exaggerated the punishment's use. A few scholars have made more detailed comments or given evidence about the Welsh Not. E. G. Millward gave examples and believed it was used before 1870. He felt that the punishment had harmed the language. The Encyclopaedia of Wales (2008) commented that the Welsh Not is viewed by Welsh patriots as an "instrument of cultural genocide." The publication also stated that the punishment was welcomed by some Welsh parents who wanted their children to practise English.

The first academic study of the Welsh Not was completed by Martin Johnes in 2024. He states that some government officials did want Welsh to cease to exist but the government never introduced policies to that end and believed that some use of Welsh was necessary in schools to effectively teach English. He comments that the state had limited influence over the school system in the 19th century and it did not prohibit the use of Welsh in schools. Johnes argued that there is little evidence to suggest that the Welsh Not caused the decline of Welsh. A large majority of children were not attending day school when it was most common, and schools that attempted to completely exclude Welsh tended to be ineffective at teaching English. He argued that;

[The Welsh Not] was not a primary cause of linguistic change but the result of pedagogical misunderstandings and people's desire for English. The first owed much to how underdeveloped education was, while the latter was rooted in Wales's subordinate position within the United Kingdom. The Welsh Not was not imperialism in a direct sense, not least because the state never sanctioned it, but it was an example of how the Anglo-centricity of the United Kingdom produced cultural forces that had the similar effects to more overt imperialistic practices in the empire. The political, economic and cultural power of English was the direct cause of the decline of Welsh because it underpinned why so many Welsh people wanted to learn the language and why they decided not to pass on their mother tongue. It was not beaten out of anyone.

== Cultural interaction ==
In 2024, the 1923 Welsh Women's Peace message was translated into the Okinawan language from the perspective of the similarities between the Okinawan dialect cards and the Welsh Not. The Asahi Shimbun compared efforts to revive the Okinawan language to efforts to promote Welsh. Japanese musicians also created a short film, inspired by the similarities between the history of Okinawan dialect tags and the Welsh Not.

== In literature ==
- Myrddin ap Dafydd (2019). Under the Welsh Not, Llanrwst, Gwasg Carreg Gwalch ISBN 978-1845276836

== See also ==
- Dialect card Hōgenfuda (方言札; "dialect card"), used to promote standard speech in Japanese schools.
- Symbole, a similar object used in French schools as a means of punishment for students caught speaking regional dialects.

== Sources ==
- Johnes, Martin (2024). Welsh Not: Elementary Education and the Anglicisation of Nineteenth-Century Wales (PDF). University of Wales Press. ISBN 9781837721818.
- Jones, Gareth Elwyn; Roderick, Gordon Wynne (2003). History of Education in Wales. University of Wales Press. ISBN 978-0708318089.
- Keane, Ann; Egen, David; Grigg, Russell; Roy, James; Morgen, Alun; Norris, Barry; Williams, Sian Rhiannon (2022). Watchdogs or Visionaries? Perspectives on the history of the education inspectorate in Wales. University of Wales Press. ISBN 978-1786839404.
- Smith, Robert (1999). School, Politics and Society: Elementary Education in Wales, 1870 — 1902. University of Wales Press. ISBN 0708315356.
- Smith, Robert (2000). "Elementary Education and the Welsh Language, 1870–1902". In Jenkins, Geraint H. (ed.). The Welsh Language and its Social Domains, 1801 - 1911. A social history of the Welsh language. University of Wales Press. ISBN 9780708316047.
