= Paul Molac =

French politician

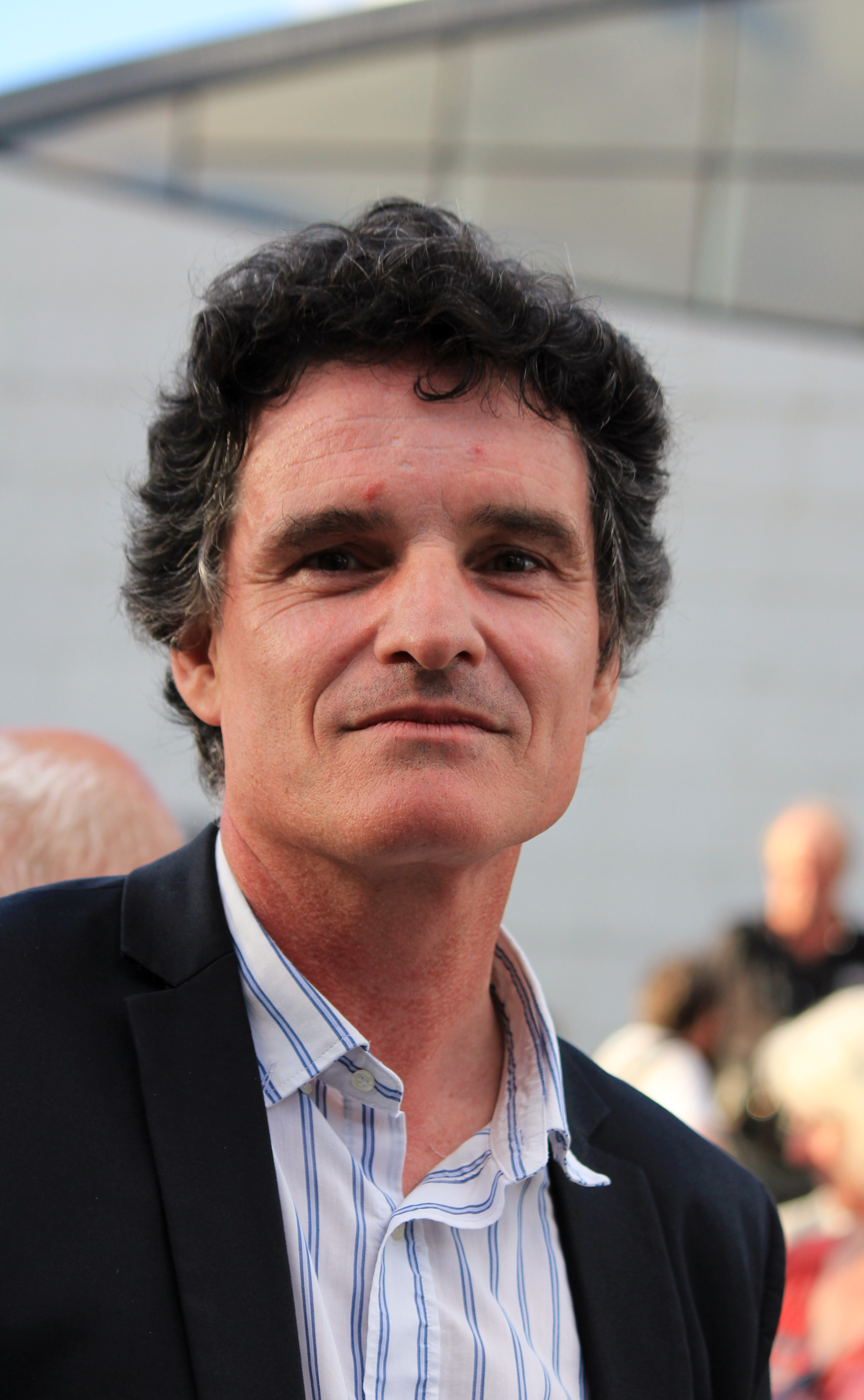

Member of the French National Assembly for Morbihan's 4th constituency
- Incumbent
- Assumed office 20 June 2012
- Preceded by: Loïc Bouvard

Personal details
- Born: 21 May 1962 (age 63) Ploërmel, France
- Party: Unvaniezh Demokratel Breizh (2009–2017); La République En Marche! (2017–2018)
- Other political affiliations: Liberties, Independents, Overseas and Territories (since 2018)

Paul Molac (French pronunciation: [pɔl mɔlak]; born 21 May 1962) is a French politician who has been serving as a member of the French National Assembly since the 2012 elections, representing Morbihan's 4th constituency.

== Political career ==
In the 2017 elections, he was one of only four deputies who were elected in the first round.

In parliament, Molac has been serving on the Committee on Legal Affairs since 2012. He was also a member of the Defence Committee from 2013 until 2015). In addition to his committee assignments, he is part of the French-Irish Parliamentary Friendship Group.

In 2018, Molac was one of the founding members of the Liberties and Territories parliamentary group.

In April 2021, Molac succeeded in securing cross-party support for a legislative proposal aimed at the protection of the heritage and promotion of France's regional languages. When the education ministry subsequently appealed the so-called "Molac law", the Constitutional Council ruled that it was out of line with article two (added in 1994) of the Constitution of France, which stipulates that the language of the French republic is French.

He was re-elected in the 2022 elections.

In March 2026, Molac announced the formation of a new Breton autonomist political party, Faisons Bretagne.

== Political positions ==
In April 2018, Molac joined other co-signatories around Sébastien Nadot in officially filing a request for a commission of inquiry into the legality of French weapons sales to the Saudi-led coalition fighting in Yemen, days before an official visit of Saudi Crown Prince Mohammed bin Salman to Paris.

== Personal life ==
Molac speaks Breton and Gallo. He is known for having spoken Breton in the French National Assembly.

== See also ==
- 2017 French legislative election
- 2022 French legislative election
